= National Register of Historic Places listings in Hillsborough County, Florida =

Location of Hillsborough County in Florida

This is a list of the National Register of Historic Places listings in Hillsborough County, Florida.

This is intended to be a complete list of the properties and districts on the National Register of Historic Places in Hillsborough County, Florida. The locations of National Register properties and districts for which the latitude and longitude coordinates are included below, may be seen in a map.

There are 100 properties and districts listed on the National Register in the county, including 3 National Historic Landmarks, all three of which are in Tampa. 22 of these properties and districts are listed here, while the others are listed separately in National Register of Historic Places listings in Tampa, Florida.

This National Park Service list is complete through NPS recent listings posted August 1, 2025.

Contents: Counties in Florida (non-linked contain no National Register listings)
Alachua - Baker - Bay - Bradford - Brevard - Broward - Calhoun - Charlotte - Citrus - Clay - Collier - Columbia - DeSoto - Dixie - Duval - Escambia - Flagler - Franklin - Gadsden - Gilchrist - Glades - Gulf - Hamilton - Hardee - Hendry - Hernando - Highlands - Hillsborough (Tampa) - Holmes - Indian River - Jackson - Jefferson - Lafayette - Lake - Lee - Leon - Levy - Liberty - Madison - Manatee - Marion - Martin - Miami-Dade (Miami) - Monroe - Nassau - Okaloosa - Okeechobee - Orange - Osceola - Palm Beach - Pasco - Pinellas - Polk - Putnam - St. Johns - St. Lucie - Santa Rosa - Sarasota - Seminole - Sumter - Suwannee - Taylor - Union - Volusia - Wakulla - Walton - Washington

== Current listings ==
	Name on the Register	Image	Date listed	Location	City or town	Description
1	Bing Rooming House	Bing Rooming House	September 14, 2002 (#02001009)	205 South Allen Street; 28°00′57″N 82°06′58″W	Plant City	
2	Cockroach Key	Cockroach Key	December 4, 1973 (#73000579)	Address Restricted	Ruskin	
3	Dr. Frank J. Costa House	Dr. Frank J. Costa House	September 2, 2021 (#100003022)	16116 Lake Magdalene Dr. 28°05′43″N 82°27′58″W	Tampa vicinity	
4	A. P. Dickman House	A. P. Dickman House	July 14, 2000 (#00000786)	120 Dickman Drive, Southeast; 27°43′02″N 82°26′10″W	Ruskin	
5	Downtown Plant City Commercial District	Downtown Plant City Commercial District	June 8, 1993 (#93000478)	Bounded by Baker and Wheeler Streets and the former Seaboard Coast Line railroad tracks 28°00′56″N 82°07′25″W	Plant City	
6	Downtown Plant City Historic Residential District	Downtown Plant City Historic Residential District	August 12, 1998 (#98000965)	Bounded by North Drane, Thomas, West Tever, Franklin, and Carey Streets; 28°01′10″N 82°07′50″W	Plant City	
7	Egmont Key	Egmont Key	December 11, 1978 (#78000946)	West of Tampa at the entrance to Tampa Bay; 27°35′24″N 82°45′46″W	Tampa Bay	
8	Fort Foster	Fort Foster	June 13, 1972 (#72000324)	15402 U.S. 301 N. 28°09′01″N 82°13′14″W	Thonotosassa	
9	Glover School	Glover School	November 29, 2001 (#01001307)	5110 Horton Road, Bealsville; 27°56′33″N 82°04′44″W	Plant City	
10	Hillsboro State Bank Building	Hillsboro State Bank Building	August 1, 1984 (#84000868)	121 North Collins Street; 28°00′57″N 82°06′50″W	Plant City	
11	Historic Turkey Creek High School	Historic Turkey Creek High School	March 2, 2001 (#01000177)	5005 Turkey Creek Road, South; 27°56′47″N 82°10′17″W	Plant City	
12	A. M. Lamb House	A. M. Lamb House	October 12, 2007 (#07001049)	2410 West Shell Road; 27°43′15″N 82°27′44″W	Ruskin	
13	George McA. Miller House	George McA. Miller House	July 23, 1974 (#74000630)	508 Tamiami Trail; 27°42′49″N 82°26′05″W	Ruskin	
14	Moseley Homestead	Moseley Homestead	January 31, 1985 (#85000159)	1820 West Brandon Boulevard; 27°56′20″N 82°18′51″W	Brandon	
15	North Plant City Residential District	North Plant City Residential District	May 27, 1993 (#93000436)	Bounded by Herring, Wheeler, Tever, and Palmer Streets; 28°01′16″N 82°07′31″W	Plant City	
16	Old Lutz Elementary School	Old Lutz Elementary School	August 15, 1996 (#96000852)	18819 U.S. Route 41, North; 28°08′51″N 82°27′43″W	Lutz	
17	Plant City High School	Plant City High School	February 4, 1981 (#81000194)	North Collins Street; 28°01′09″N 82°07′36″W	Plant City	
18	Plant City Union Depot	Plant City Union Depot	April 14, 1975 (#75000558)	East North Drane Street; 28°00′55″N 82°07′18″W	Plant City	
19	Standard Oil Service Station	Standard Oil Service Station	September 6, 1996 (#96000974)	1111 North Wheeler Street; 28°01′29″N 82°07′35″W	Plant City	
20	Temple Terrace Golf Course	Temple Terrace Golf Course	October 30, 2012 (#12000888)	200 Inverness Avenue; 28°02′13″N 82°23′07″W	Temple Terrace	
21	U.S.S. Narcissus (tugboat) Shipwreck		October 15, 2018 (#100003048)	2.75 mi. NW of Egmont Key; 27°37′28″N 82°48′03″W	Fort DeSoto vicinity	Florida's twelfth Underwater Archaeological Preserve
22	Upper Tampa Bay Archeological District	Upper Tampa Bay Archeological District	December 10, 1985 (#85003330)	Address Restricted; 28°00′48″N 82°38′05″W	Town 'N' Country	

== See also ==
- List of National Historic Landmarks in Florida
- National Register of Historic Places listings in Florida
- National Register of Historic Places listings in Tampa, Florida
- List of Mediterranean Revival Style Buildings of Davis Islands
