= Ruby Williams =

American folk artist (1928–2022)

- Born: Ruby Curry; June 9, 1928; Bealsville, Florida, U.S.
- Died: August 8, 2022 (aged 94); Plant City, Florida
- Style: Folk art
- Children: 2

Ruby C. Williams (June 9, 1928 – August 8, 2022) was an American folk artist.

== Life ==
Ruby Curry was born to Viola Curry Greene and Lawrence Curry in Bealsville, Florida, where she grew up in a community formed by freed slaves, including Curry's great grandmother, Mary Reddick, who founded the community's school.

Known as Miss Ruby, she was an evangelical minister in Paterson, New Jersey, for 25 years. She adopted the name Williams following her marriage, which ended in a "bitter divorce" in the 1960s.

After she returned to Florida in the 1980s, she ran a produce stand and "walk in" gallery on State Road 60. A self-taught artist, her career in folk art began in 1991 when her hand-painted signs, advertising her fruits and vegetables, were noticed by fellow folk painter, Rodney Hardee, who helped her to draw the attention of local media and institutions, including the Polk Museum of Art in Lakeland, mounted exhibitions.

Williams' preferred medium was acrylic paint on plywood; initially, she used house paint for her creations. Her subject matter varied from scenes of everyday life to more whimsical or religious pieces.

In 2000, 25 of Williams' paintings were exhibited at the Paterson Museum in New Jersey.

In 2005 she received the Florida Folk Heritage Award and was included in the show On Their Own – Selected Self-taught Artists at the Smithsonian Anacostia Museum in Washington D.C.
