= Florida State Road 39 =

Highway in Florida, US

State Road 39
- SR 39 highlighted in red and SR 39A in blue

Route information
- Maintained by FDOT
- Length: 27.472 mi (44.212 km)
- Existed: 1945 renumbering–present

Major junctions
- South end: SR 60 / CR 39 at Hopewell
- US 92 in Plant City; I-4 in Plant City; US 301 near Zephyrhills
- North end: US 98 / US 301 near Dade City

Location
- Country: United States
- State: Florida
- Counties: Hillsborough, Pasco

Highway system
- Florida State Highway System; Interstate; US; State; Former; Pre‑1945; Toll; Scenic
← SR 37	→ SR 39A

State Road 39 (SR 39) is a north–south state highway in eastern Pasco and Hillsborough County, Florida, United States. Between Plant City and Zephyrhills, the road is named Paul S. Buchman Highway. North of Zephyrhills, Florida the road is a secret state designation for U.S. Route 301 until the southern terminus of the concurrency with U.S. Route 98 south of Dade City, Florida.

== Route description ==
=== Hillsborough County ===
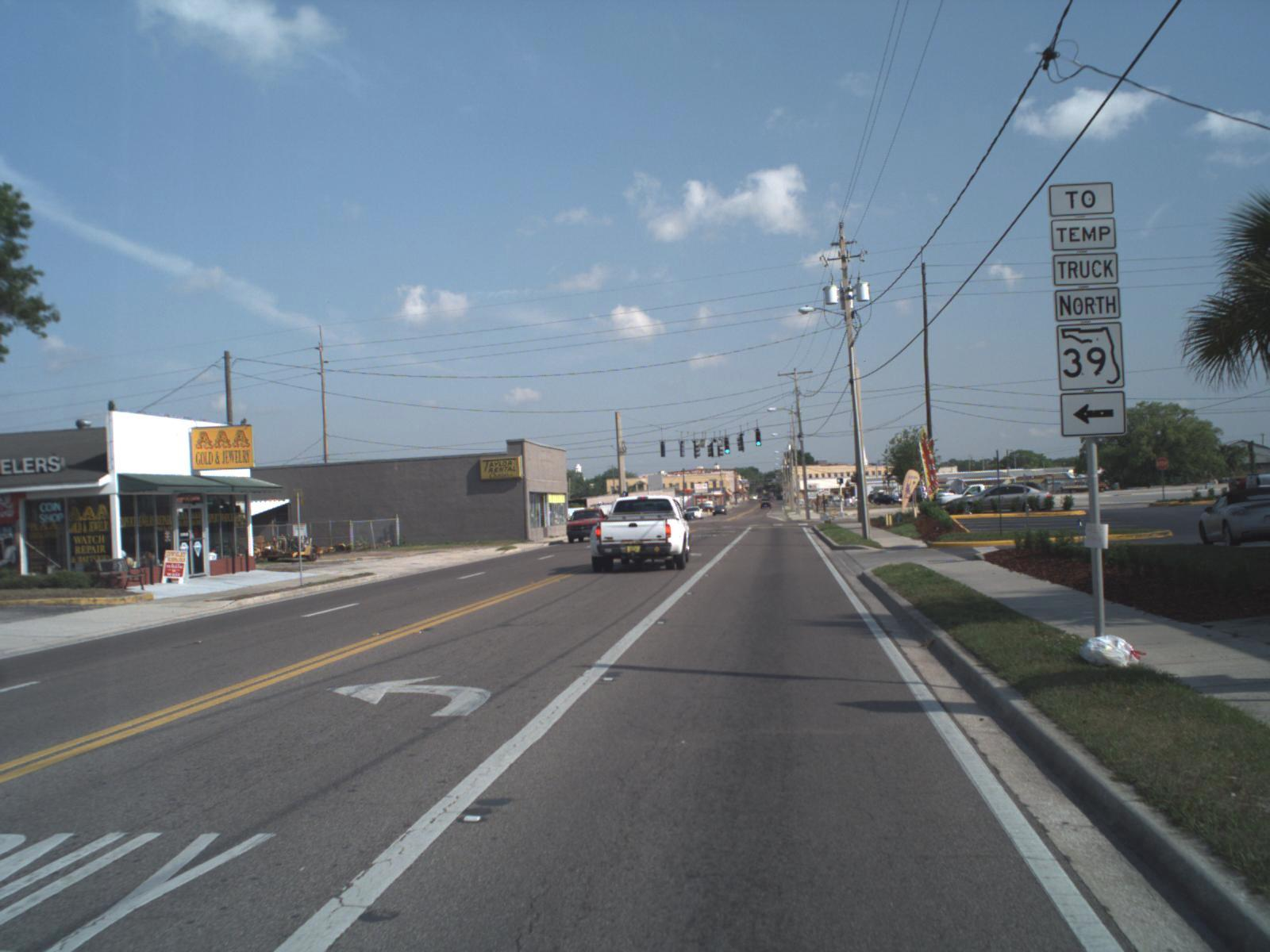
South end of the "temporary" truck route through downtown Plant City

State Road 39 begins at the SR 60 and County Road 39 in Hopewell. The road enters the Plant City Limits at Trapnell Road. An overhead sign gantry points to a truck detour as the road approaches West Alexander Street, although East Alexander Street continues as a four-lane divided highway toward Jim Johnson Road. It's at this intersection where SR 39 makes a left turn while James L. Redman Parkway continues as State Road 39A. The route continues west until it makes a curve between West Maki Road and Mud Lake Road just before passing by the Florida Heart Institute and running straight north.

Between West Ball Street and Sammons Road, SR 39 crosses the CSX Yeoman Subdivision, and later crosses the CSX Lakeland Subdivision, which carries Amtrak's Silver Star line. After those two railroad crossings, the route serves as the last intersection with State Road 574 (Reynolds Street) before that route terminates at U.S. Route 92. SR 39 itself intersects eastbound US 92 (formerly a segment of State Road 566) at Thonotosassa Road (which also contains an intersection with West Oak Avenue on the southwest corner), and then westbound US 92 at West Baker Street (State Road 600). Between Victoria Street and West Spencer Avenue, it curves from north to north-northeast, and then turns straight north again just before the interchange with Interstate 4 (Exit 21), which also contains frontage roads that also extend east to SR 39A. After I-4, Alexander Street makes a slight northwest reverse curve that ends just as the route officially leaves the Plant City Limits south of the intersection with County Road 580, which is not only a county extension of State Road 580 in Tampa and Pinellas County to the west. The next major intersection is the northern terminus of State Road 39A, which is named Paul S. Buchman Highway. From there the road runs along the west side of the CSX Yeoman Subdivision and SR 39 will official become part of Paul S. Buchman Highway at the intersection with County Road 582 (Knights-Griffin Road) in Knights, which likewise is a county extension of State Road 582, but unlike CR 580, crosses over into Polk County. After passing by the Blackwater Ultralight Flightpath, SR 39 and the Yeoman Subdivision both run near a mine just south of the Hillsborough-Pasco County Line.

=== Pasco County and beyond ===
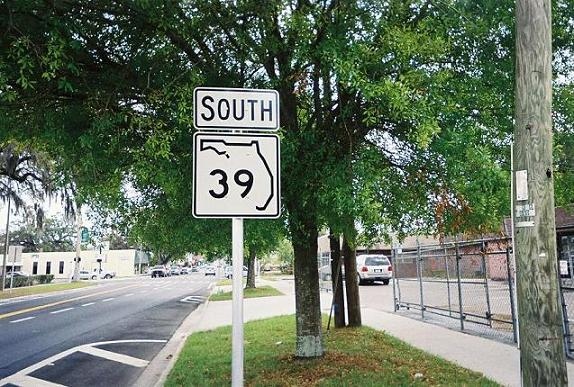
SR 39 was briefly posted in Dade City (2007)

In Crystal Springs the road moves away from the Yeoman Subdivision in south of the Hillsborough River, but still remains at a northwesterly direction. Just north of the river, it gradually enters Zephyrhills South where the first major intersection is County Road 535. The road serves as the entrance to the Shady Oaks trailer park and after intersecting Tucker road, meets a wye intersection with U.S. Route 301 and then becomes a hidden route, shared with State Road 41. US 301-SRs 39-41 all enter the City of Zephyrhills and serve as the eastern terminus of State Road 54 at Fifth Avenue. Some maps suggest that it also take SR 54 with it as a hidden route until it reaches Eiland Boulevard. When SR 41 branches off to the northwest and becomes CR 41, SR 39 becomes the sole hidden route for US 301 until the southern terminus of the US 98 (SRs 35-700) multiplex in Clinton Heights, south of Dade City. North of there, it serves as a hidden route for US 98 along with State Road 700, and apparently continues towards northern terminus of the US 98-301 multiplex in Trilacoochee where US 301 runs along SR 35, while US 98-SR 700 runs towards a multiplex with SR 50 in Ridge Manor.

In 2007, a resurfacing project of US 98-301 in Dade City led to the exposure of the road's status as State Road 39, as detour signs popped up around downtown. This was also part of an effort to realign US 98-301 to the truck route. SRs 35 & 700 remain hidden state roads in this segment, while mainline US 98-301 follows the former truck route along hidden SR 533.

== Related routes ==
=== Former segments ===
==== Florida SR 39A ====
State Road 39A
- Location: Plant City-Knights
- Length: 5.416 mi (8.716 km)

State Road 39A (SR 39A) is an alternate route within Plant City, and a former segment of SR 39. The route begins at the intersection of West and East Alexander Street, where SR 39 turns from north to west, but this segment is also overlapped by an eastern truck detour of SR 39. A truck detour sign gantry can be found at the southern terminus of State Road 553 (Park Road). A third "temporary" truck route is signed along Alabama and Wheeler Streets through downtown. At Grant Street, the James L. Redman Parkway becomes South Collins Street, but from there it also shares a concurrency with County Road 574A, until it reaches East Alsobrook Street. Further into the city, SR 39 has a pair of at-grade crossings with the west end of CSX wye between the Yeoman and Plant City Subdivisions at the intersection with Laura Street.

After the intersection with Dr. Martin Luther King Jr. Boulevard, it crosses the CSX Lakeland Subdivision, which carries Amtrak's Silver Star line, and enters the Downtown Plant City Commercial District where two blocks later intersects eastbound U.S. Route 92 (State Road 600/State Road 574). Here this route also splits as South Collins Street contains only Northbound SR 39A, and then turns onto westbound US 92 (SR 600) two blocks later, only to reunite with southbound SR 39 at North Wheeler Street, two blocks west of there. Simultaneously, Southbound SR 39A continues along North Wheeler Street and then turns left onto eastbound US 92 until it reunites with the northbound route at South Collins Street. From here it enters the Downtown Plant City Historic Residential District which ends just south of the interchange with Interstate 4 (Exit 21), which also contains frontage roads that serve SR 39. North of the interchange with I-4, much of SR 39A runs along the west side of the Yeoman Subdivision as it becomes the Paul S. Buchman Highway. SR 39A itself does not leave Plant City until the intersection with County Road 580, which is not only a county extension of State Road 580 in Tampa and Pinellas County to the west, but as the northern segment of the Eastern Plant City truck route. Florida State Road 39A ends at SR 39 just before that route's intersection with County Road 582 (Knights-Griffin Road) in Knights.

The entire route is in Plant City, Hillsborough County.

mi	km	Destinations	Notes
0.000	0.000	SR 39 north (Alexander Street)	Southern terminus of FL 39A
		CR 39B (East Park Road)	Southern terminus of hidden FL 39 Truck
1.997	3.214	US 92 (Baker Street)	
3.337	5.370	I-4	
4.201	6.761	CR 580 (Sam Allen Road)	
5.416	8.716	SR 39 south (Alexander Street)	Northern terminus of FL 39A
1.000 mi = 1.609 km; 1.000 km = 0.621 mi

==== Hillsborough and Manatee Counties ====
County Road 39
- Location: Duette-Plant City

South of SR 60 former State Road 39 continues as County Road 39, through Manatee County into SR 62 near Duette. The road is known as Kickliter Road from SR 62 to State Road 674 in Fort Lonesome, and Plant City-Picnic Road from SR 674 to SR 60.

==== Hernando County ====
County Road 439
- Location: Hernando County

In and around Ridge Manor, former SR 39 ran along what is today US 98(SR 700) and old SR 50 to Croom-Rital Road. It then broke away from US 98/SR 50 and was the designation for Croom-Rital Road, a street which runs along what today is the Withlacoochee State Trail, until reaching the unincorporated hamlet of Croom. North of Croom Road, SR 39 went on to Nobleton Road, which is a road that hadn't been paved until the early 21st Century and also follows the Withlacoochee State Trail until it becomes Edgewater Avenue, and crosses the trail heading into scenic Nobleton, where it terminates and used to turn west to overlap CR 476. In Istachatta, another former section exists as County Road 439, then crosses into Citrus County.

==== Citrus County ====
County Road 39
- Location: Citrus County

When the road crosses into Pineola in Citrus County, it resumes its designation as County Road 39, however the designation exists in two sections. It winds along the Withlacoochee State Trail, but eventually the trail moves to the northwest. After running across Bradley Lake, it finally terminates at County Road 48. The journey of former SR 39 does not end there though, as it secretly overlaps westbound along CR 48 towards Floral City. North of Floral City, former SR 39 runs along Old Floral City Avenue, where it runs along the Withlacoochee State Trail past County Road 39A, and Fort Cooper State Park, before entering Inverness South.

Again between Stoke's Ferry at State Road 200 and US 41 in Citrus Springs, County Road 39 winds along the south side of the Withlacoochee River as the Withlacoochee Trail.

== Plant City Truck Routes ==
=== Florida SR 39 Truck ===
State Road 39 Truck
- Location: Plant City-Knights

Two Truck Routes of State Road 39 used to exist around historic downtown Plant City. The west side truck route follows the pattern of the current State Road 39 beginning at the intersection of West Alexander Street, East Alexander Street and James L. Redman Parkway. The route continues west until it makes a curve between West Maki Road and Mud Lake Road just before passing by the Florida Heart Institute and running straight north until it reached Interstate 4 (Exit 19), then ran along the frontage roads of I-4 to Paul Buckman Highway. This route was officially eliminated when Alexander Street was extended to Paul Buckman Highway in Knights, and SRs 39 and 39A switched places within Plant City.

The east side truck route begins at the intersection of West and East Alexander Street, where SR 39 turns from north to west, but this segment is also overlapped by an eastern truck detour of SR 39. A truck detour sign gantry can be found at the southern terminus of State Road 553 (East Park Road). Further into the city, SR 39 has an at-grade crossings with the CSX Plant City Subdivision just before terminating at South Park Road, Jim Johnson Road and Roberts Ranch Road.

After the intersection with Alsbrook Street and Coronet Road, it crosses the CSX Lakeland Subdivision immediately before it intersects U.S. Route 92 (State Road 600). Here the street name changes to North Park Road (State Road 553) and contains a hidden continuation of FL Truck Route 39, both of which run practically straight north for SR 553's entire route. SRs 553 and east Truck Route 39 end at the interchange with Interstate 4 (Exit 22), which also contains frontage roads that serve SR 39. North of the interchange, North Park Road continues as a four-lane divided highway leading to housing developments.

== Former proposals ==
In the early 20th century, a connection between County Road 48 and SR 200 was planned to run along the west-north side of the Withlacoochee River. This is why there are two sections of CR 39 in Citrus County. It was proposed to end at US 41.

== Major intersections ==
County	Location	mi	km	Destinations	Notes
Hillsborough	Hopewell	0.000	0.000	SR 60 / CR 39 south – Mulberry, Brandon	
Hillsborough	Plant City	3.538	5.694	SR 39A north (James L. Redman Parkway) to I-4 – truck route to I-4 east, Downtown Plant City	Former routing of SR 39 until December 2013
Hillsborough	Plant City	6.119	9.848	SR 574 (West Reynolds Street) – Strawberry Festival Grounds	
Hillsborough	Plant City	6.242	10.046	US 92 east (Thononosassa Road / SR 600) – Lakeland	Eastbound one-way pair
Hillsborough	Plant City	6.333	10.192	US 92 west (West Baker Street / SR 600) – Tampa	Westbound one-way pair
Hillsborough	Plant City	7.352	11.832	I-4 (SR 400) – Orlando, Lakeland, Tampa	I-4 exit 21
Hillsborough		8.427	13.562	CR 580 (Sam Allen Road)	
Hillsborough		9.554	15.376	SR 39A south (Paul Buckman Highway) – Downtown Plant City	Former routing of SR 39 until December 2013
Hillsborough	Knights	10.442	16.805	CR 582 (Knights Griffin Road)	
Pasco	Zephyrhills	19.188	30.880	CR 535 north (Chancey Road) – Dade City	
Pasco		19.894	32.016	US 301 south (Gall Boulevard / SR 41) – Tampa	south end of US 301 overlap
Pasco	see US 301 (mile 75.496-83.074)				
Pasco		27.472	44.212	US 98 / US 301 north (SR 35 / SR 700) – Lakeland, Dade City	north end of US 301 overlap
1.000 mi = 1.609 km; 1.000 km = 0.621 mi: Concurrency terminus
