= Beallsville =

Beallsville or Bealsville can refer to a location in the United States:

- Bealsville, Florida
- Beallsville, Maryland
- Beallsville, Ohio
- Beallsville, Pennsylvania
