= Knights, Florida =

Unincorporated community in Florida, US

- Unincorporated community
- Location within Florida Location within the United States
- Coordinates: 28°04′35″N 82°08′15″W
- Country: United States
- State: Florida
- County: Hillsborough
- Time zone: UTC-5 (Eastern (EST))
  - Summer (DST): UTC-4 (EDT)

Knights is an unincorporated community in northeastern Hillsborough County, Florida, United States, near Plant City. Knights is located along Florida State Road 39 at the intersection of Hillsborough County Road 582, but also includes the northern terminus of Florida State Road 39A.

== History ==
Knights dates to 1844, when the Knight and Summerlin families moved from near what is now Valdosta, Georgia, and settled along Itchepackesassa Creek just north of what is today Plant City.

== Education ==
The community of Knights is served by Hillsborough County Schools.
