= Francis J. Kennard =

American architect

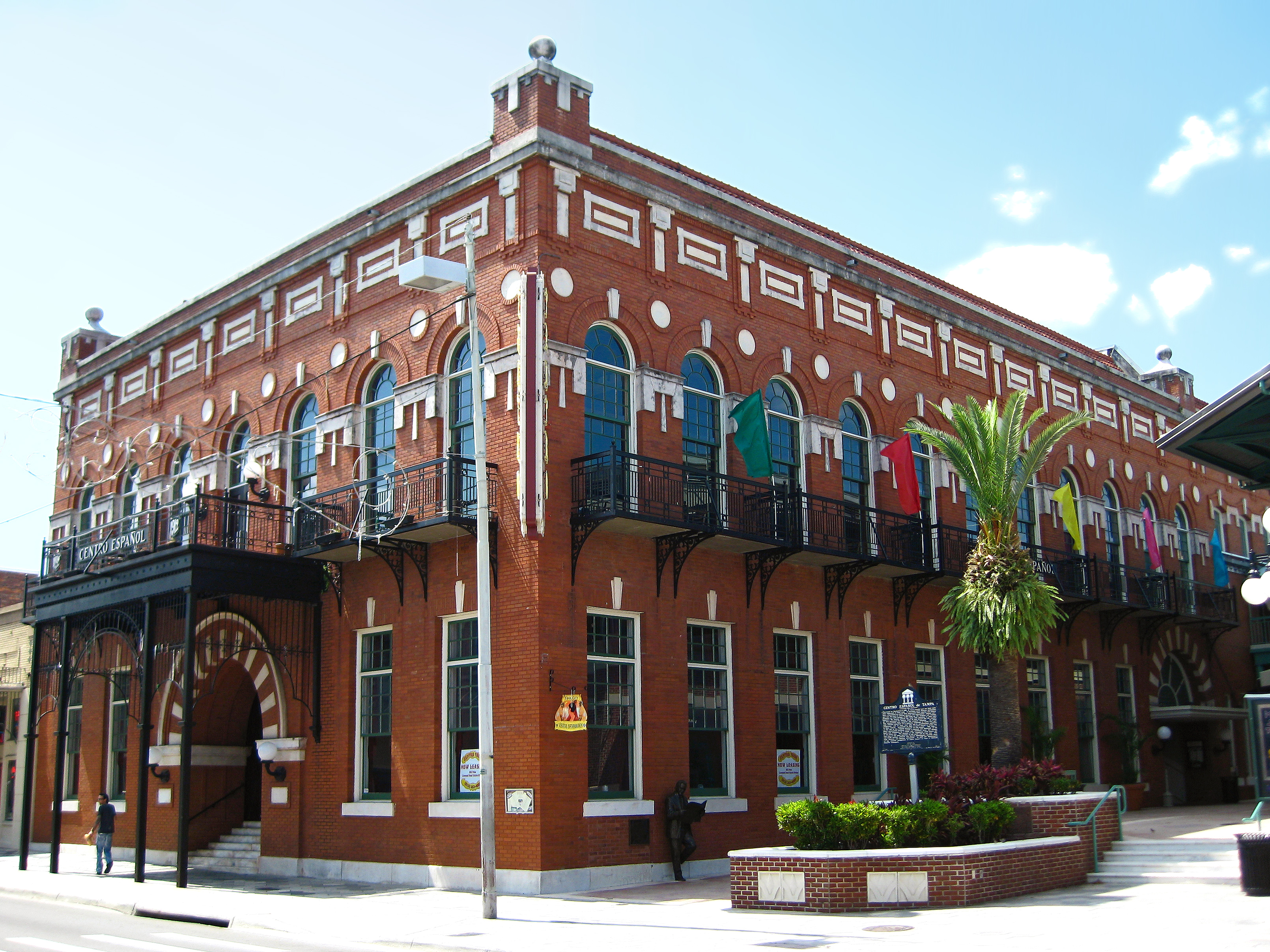
El Centro Español de Tampa

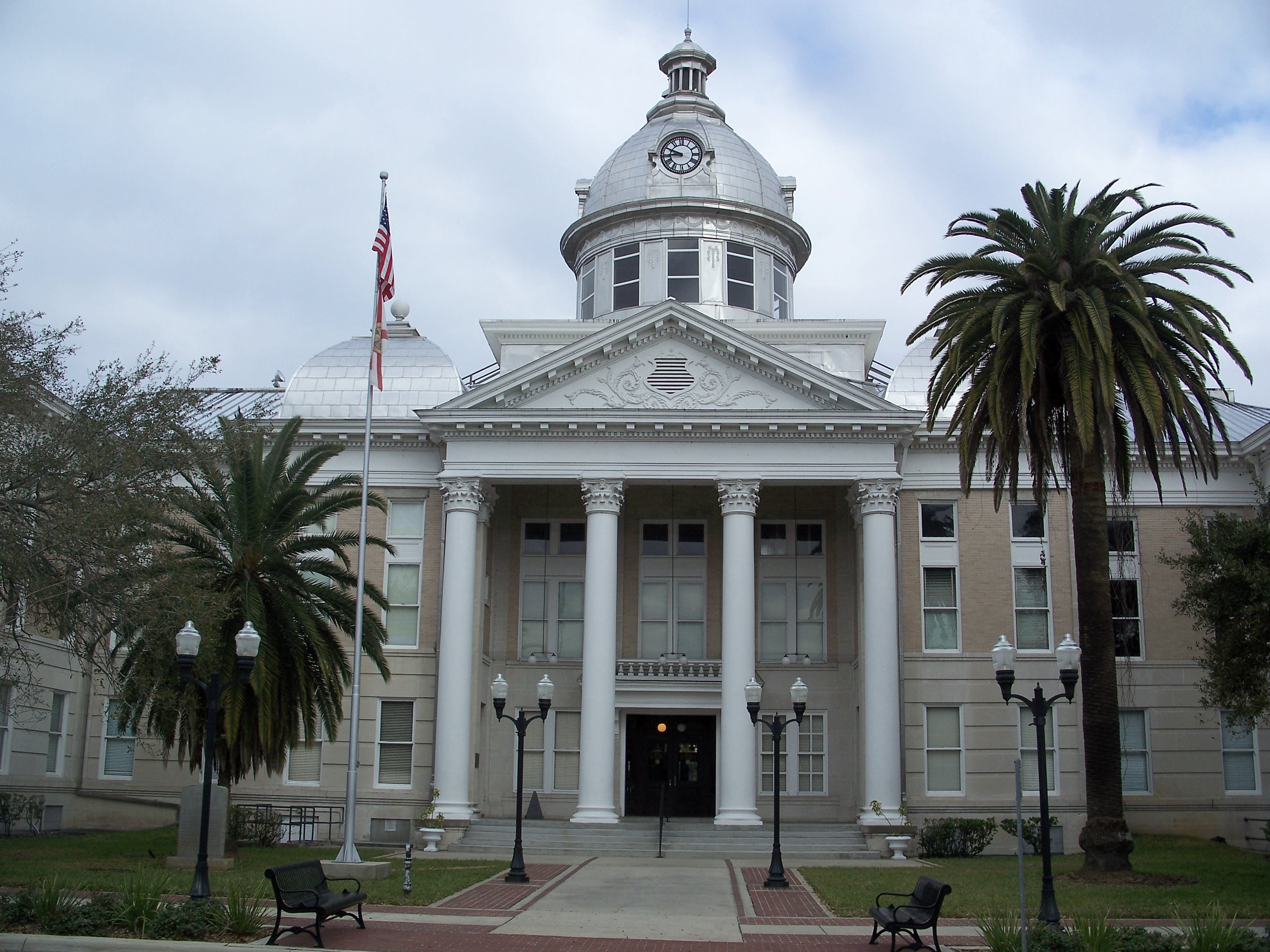
Old Polk County Courthouse

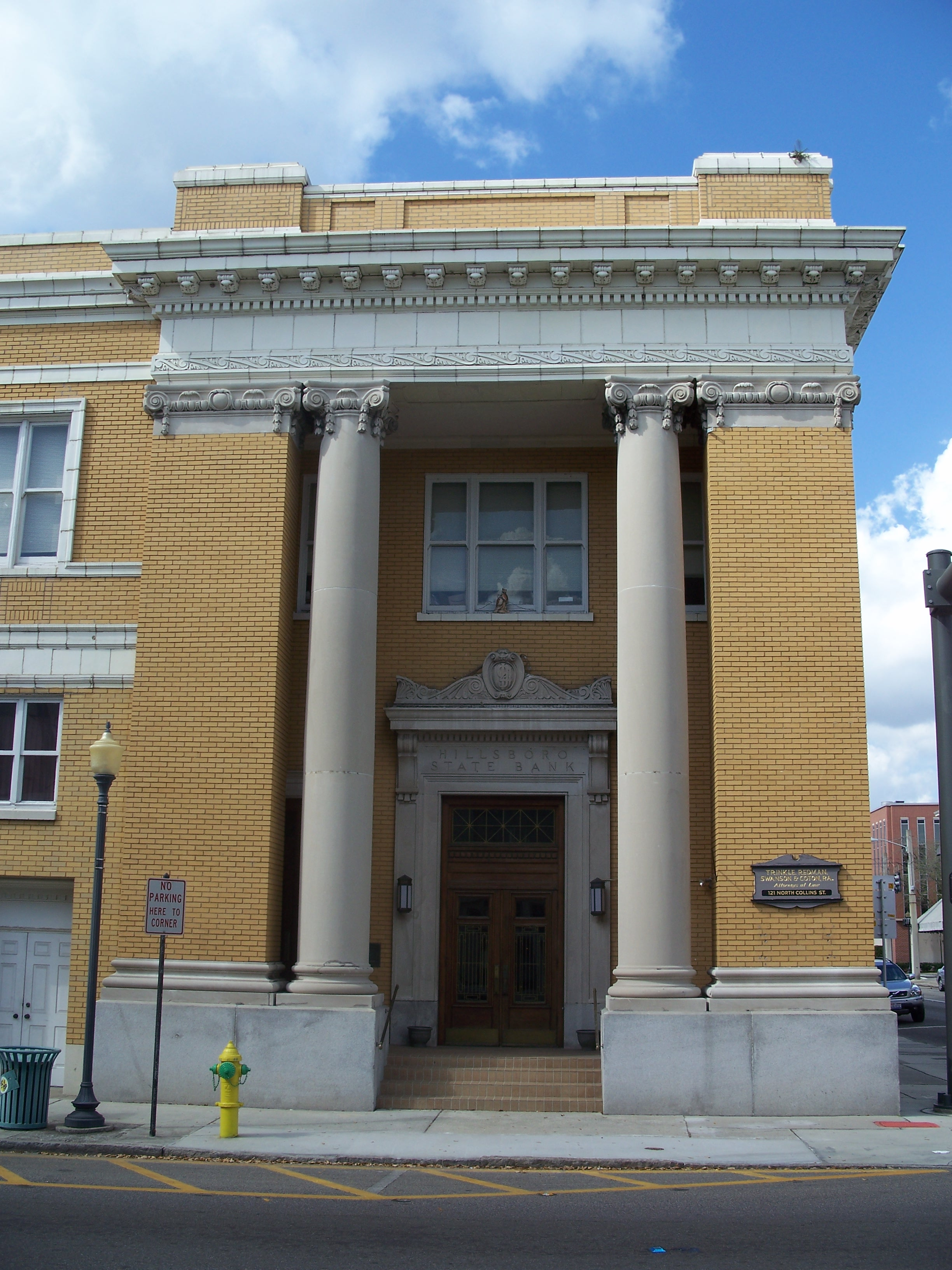
Hillsboro Bank Building in Plant City

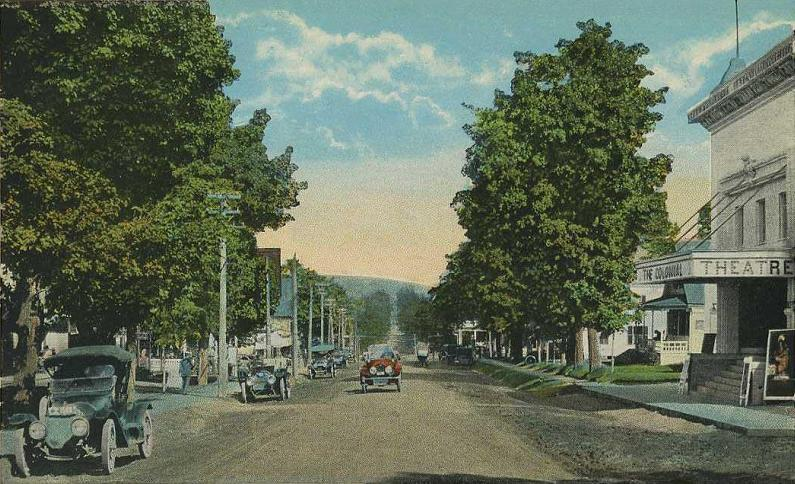
Colonial Theatre in Bethlehem, New Hampshire as pictured on a 1920 postcard

Francis J. Kennard (March 15, 1865 - April 29, 1944) was a prolific architect of many prominent buildings in Tampa, Florida. The public buildings he designed are often in the Neoclassical style. His work includes Hillsborough High School, St. Andrews Episcopal Church, and the Belleview-Biltmore Hotel. Kennard employed the French Renaissance Revival style in his design for el Centro Español de Tampa as well as influences from Moorish Revival and Spanish Mediterranean Revival.

Kennard's expansion plan for the Boca Grande Hotel became the Gasparilla Inn. At the opening, a contact he made later contracted for Kennard to design for the Colonial Theatre (Bethlehem, New Hampshire), called Art Deco although it predates that style's designated period.

== Progeny ==
Kennard's son Philip was born in Orlando on December 29, 1890 and eventually joined his father's firm as Francis J. Kennard and Son. The company designed West Coast Title Company headquarters in 1926 (now the Municipal Services Building). The St. Petersburg Times called them "pioneer architects of the west coast of Florida."

Philip Kennard established an independent practice in downtown St. Petersburg in 1938 at 302 Central Avenue. He designed the Carleve Hotel, Nautical Apartments and the Royal Theater during the 1930s and 1940s. By the mid-1950s he was working on several Pinellas County schools including Northeast High School, Boca Ciega High School, 74th Street Elementary School and 16th Street Junior High School. Philip Kennard died in St. Petersburg on September 18, 1956 and is buried at the Royal Palm Cemetery.

== Work ==
- Anderson-Frank House with Michael J. Miller assisting
- Belleview-Biltmore Hotel
- Firestone Building (1929) 578 North Orange Avenue (Francis J. Kennard & Son)
- Floridan Palace Hotel (1927) with G.A. Miller (builder)
- additions to the Old Polk County Courthouse (1926)
- Old Pinellas County Courthouse (1918)
- Old Lee County Courthouse Fort Myers (1915)
- Colonial Theatre, Bethlehem, New Hampshire (1915)
- Gasparilla Inn 1912 (an expansion of the Boca Grande Hotel)
- El Centro Español de Tampa (1912)
- Old Polk County Courthouse with Edward Columbus Hosford
- St. Andrews Episcopal Church with Michael J. Miller
- Hillsboro Bank Building with G.A. Miller
