= Colonial Theatre (Bethlehem, New Hampshire) =

- The building in 2024

- Location within New Hampshire
- 44°16′48″N 71°41′25″W
- Location: Bethlehem, New Hampshire

History
- Built: 1915

Site notes
- Architect: Francis J. Kennard
- Architectural style: Egyptian Revival style
- Website: www.bethlehemcolonial.org

NH State Register of Historic Places
- Designated: April 29, 2002

The Colonial Theatre in Bethlehem, New Hampshire, is a historic movie theater built in 1915 and one of the oldest continuously operating movie theaters in the United States. When the Colonial opened its doors, the era of the grand hotels was in full swing and Bethlehem was a premier destination resort town. Because of its sophisticated clientele the Colonial quickly became a venue for movie studios to test market their films. It was designed by Francis J. Kennard of Tampa, Florida, in the Egyptian Revival style, and is the only known instance of such a style being represented in New Hampshire. The property was listed on the New Hampshire State Register of Historic Places in 2002.

== History and description ==
The Colonial Theatre is located at 2050 Main Street and was built by Karl Abbott, scion of Bethlehem hotelier Frank Abbott. In the summer of 1914, as documented in K. Abbott's 1950 memoir Open for the Season, Abbott, with his then-partner "Doc" Clark, converted the family stables to a garage for automobiles, then looked further: "The vacant lot across the street at which I happened to be looking suddenly took on a vision — before my eyes rose a modern movie house with electrically lighted marquee." By spring of the following year construction was complete and the Colonial Theatre opened for business on July 1, 1915, with a showing of Cecil B. DeMille's The Girl of the Golden West. The theatre included an electrically lighted marquee.

Building on his father's purchase of the Uplands Hotel in Bethlehem in 1886, Frank H. Abbott and Son became one of the pre-eminent owners and operators of grand hotels in the White Mountains, with holdings in Florida, North Carolina, New York state, and Boston as well. Locally, in addition to the Uplands, they owned the Forest Hills in Franconia, and one of the most successful resorts of its era, the Profile House in Franconia Notch.

In 1922, overwhelmed with the operation of the Profile House, Karl sold the Colonial, still legally owned by Abbott and Clark, to Jack Eames, a local resident who was president of the Interstate Amusement Company. The transaction was negotiated on an impulse when they happened to meet on the night train to Boston. The theater remained with the Eames until it was purchased by the nonprofit The Friends of the Colonial in 2001.

The Colonial now presents national touring artists, independent and world cinema, children's events, and community events annually from May 1 through October 30.

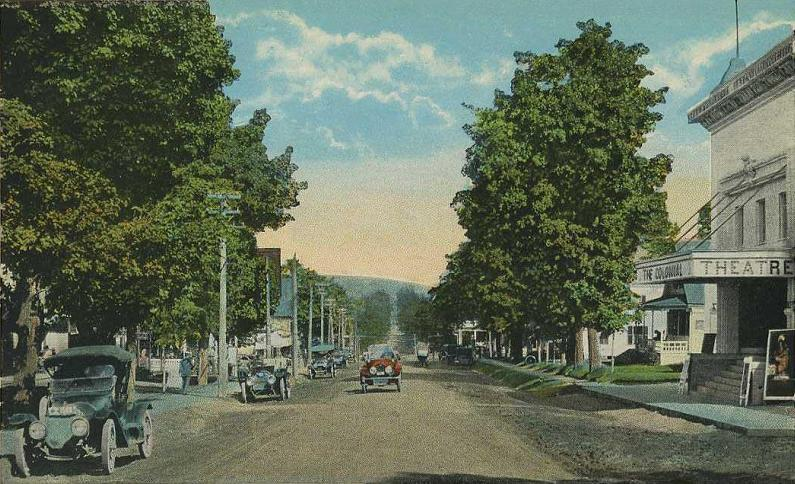
The Colonial Theatre as featured on a 1920 postcard
