= Florida State Road 553 =

State highway in Florida, United States

State Road 553
- Park Road

Route information
- Maintained by FDOT
- Length: 1.410 mi (2.269 km)

Major junctions
- South end: US 92 in Plant City
- North end: I-4 in Plant City

Location
- Country: United States
- State: Florida
- Counties: Hillsborough

Highway system
- Florida State Highway System; Interstate; US; State; Former; Pre‑1945; Toll; Scenic
← SR 552	→ SR 555

State Road 553 (SR 553) is a 1.4-mile-long (2.3 km), north–south highway in Plant City, Florida connecting U.S. Route 92 (US 92) and Interstate 4 (I-4). The road also serves as part of the eastern Florida State Road 39 Truck Route around historic downtown Plant City.

== Route description ==
SR 553's southern terminus is at US 92 to the east of downtown Plant City. The road head towards northeast Plant City to intersect I-4 at its exit 22. Just north of the interchange, state maintenance of roadway ends at North Frontage Road, while the roadway continues north as North Park Road. SR 553 never leaves the city limits of Plant City and is also known under the name of Park Road and is a 6-lane divided highway north of US 92 all the way to Interstate 4.

== History ==
State Road 553 originally appeared along the north–south section of, what is now, County Road 2224, in eastern Liberty County. Park Avenue was originally designated as Florida State Road 600A, a route number also assigned to Manhattan Avenue and Henderson Boulevard in Southwest Tampa, as well as what is today Florida State Road 546 in Lakeland. The original interchange with I-4 was a westbound only flyover to southbound 600A and a north-to-eastbound only on-ramp to I-4.

== Major intersections ==
The entire route is in Plant City, Hillsborough County.

mi	km	Destinations	Notes
0.000	0.000	US 92 (SR 600); Park Road - truck route to SR 39 south	
1.24	2.00	I-4 (SR 400) – Tampa, Orlando	I-4 exit 22
1.410	2.269	Frontage Road	North end of state maintenance
1.000 mi = 1.609 km; 1.000 km = 0.621 mi
