= Glover School (Florida) =

School in Bealsville, Florida, US (1933–1980)

- U.S. National Register of Historic Places
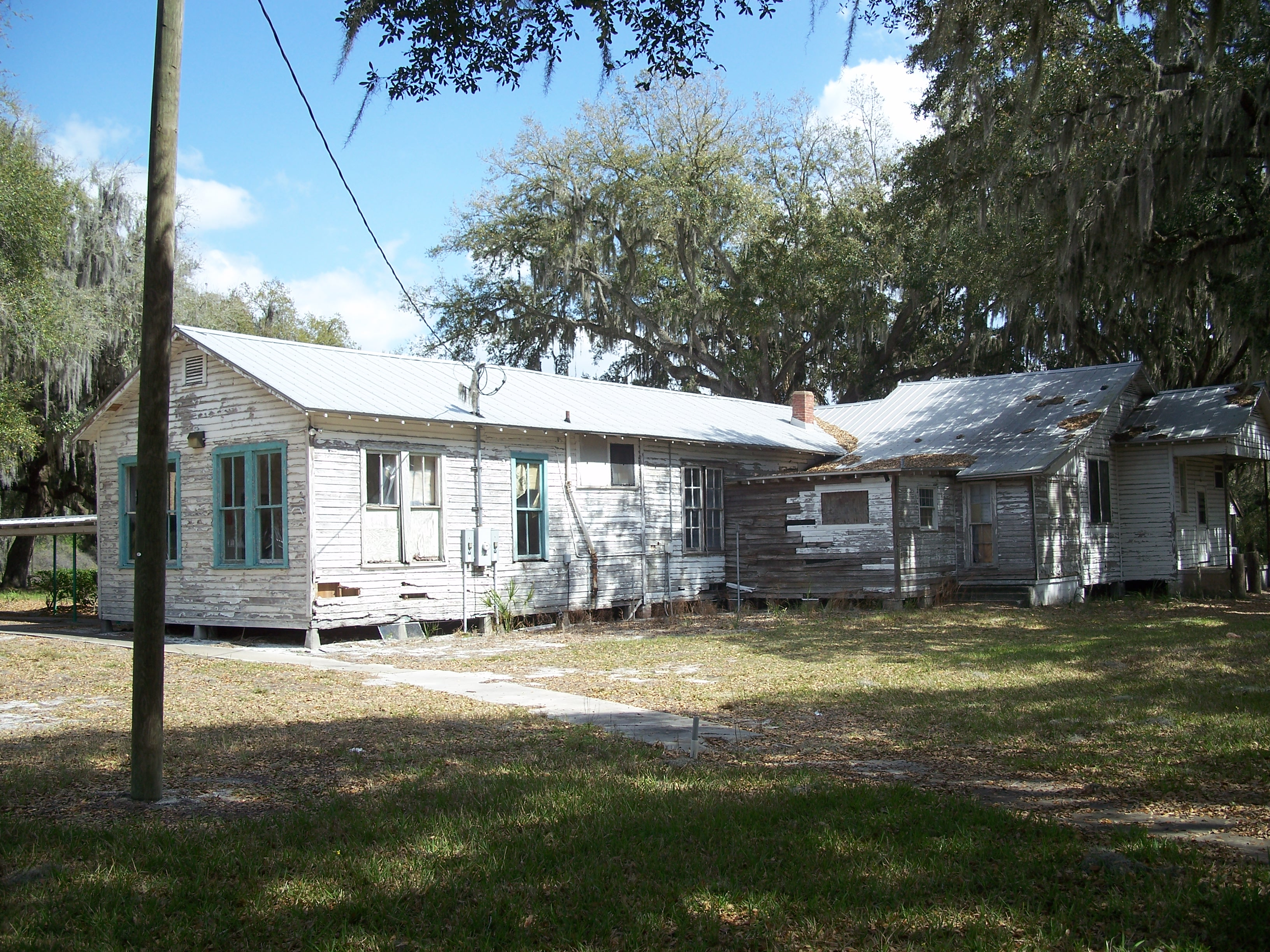

- Location within Florida
- Location: 5104 Horton Road, Plant City, Florida, U.S.
- Coordinates: 27°56′33″N 82°4′44″W
- Area: 10 acres (4.0 ha)
- Built: 1933
- Architectural style: frame vernacular
- NRHP reference No.: 01001307
- Added to NRHP: November 29, 2001

The William Glover Negro School, or Glover School is a historic school building that was founded as a segregated school for Black children in Bealsville, near Plant City, Florida. On November 29, 2001, it was added to the U.S. National Register of Historic Places under the name "Glover School".

== History ==
The community of Bealsville, Florida was established in 1865 by freed slaves. Prior to 1933 local school classes were held in a church. The local citizens, in an effort to provide education for their children, raised the money and secured the land for their own school when the School District of Hillsborough County would not provide one.

The Glover School site has five historic buildings. In 1933, the community raised USD $900 to build the first building. In 1940, students sold produce to earn enough money to add a library. In 1947, the school board approved drilling a new well to replace one that was contaminated. In 1954, along with Pinecrest High School and Plant City High School, the school operated an on-campus strawberry canning facility that was open to the public.

Once integration started, Black students who once went to Glover were bussed to other schools. The school closed in 1980, due to lack of students.
