= Quintilla Geer Bruton =

American philanthropist and library advocate

Emma Quintilla Geer Bruton
- Bruton in 1963
- Born: December 16, 1907; Walton, Kentucky
- Died: January 4, 1989 (aged 81); Plant City, Florida

Emma Quintilla Geer Bruton (December 16, 1907 – January 4, 1989) was an American philanthropist, author, library advocate, the namesake for the Bruton Memorial Library in Plant City, Florida, as well as that for Bruton-Geer Hall at the University of Florida Levin College of Law in Gainesville, Florida.

== Early life ==
Geer was born in Walton, Kentucky, and moved to Florida in 1923. She graduated from Plant City High School as valedictorian in 1926 and attended Tampa Business College and Brewster Vocational School. She married James Bruton Jr. in Tampa, Florida, in 1932. He worked as a county judge for Hillsborough County. The two of them purchased 50 acres of land northwest of Plant City, Florida, and named it Audubon Acres. There they created a peaceful bird and wildlife sanctuary. Bruton was president of Woman's Club of Plant City, and when Interstate 4 was built through the middle of Audubon Acres, she turned her attentions to library advocacy.

== Library advocacy ==
As chairman of the Plant City's Woman's Club, Bruton started the Plant City library, and then went on to develop the countywide library in Hillsborough County. She set up the county's first library board and served as committee's chairman on that board for 12 years. The Tampa library was built in 1960 during her tenure, as well as many satellite branches, including Ruskin, Brandon and Ybor City. Prior to 1960, Tampa's only library was a 2000 volume collection in a former house to serve a city of over 100,000 people. Bruton served on the Florida State Library Board from 1961 to 1969 and as the board's chairman in 1961 and 1962. For her work with library advocacy she received the Book of the Month Club's Dorothy Canfield Fisher Library award for Florida on behalf of the Plant City Public Library in 1963.

== Legacy ==
Bruton was a founder of the East Hillsborough Historical Society, which maintains the Quintilla Geer Bruton Archives Center. The Plant City Public Library was named the Quintilla Geer Bruton Memorial Library between 1989 and 1994 when the name was changed to the Bruton Memorial Library to encompass the contributions of both her and her husband. She and her husband gave $1.13 million to the University of Florida in 1982 after selling Audubon Acres, on which I-4 was eventually built. Bruton-Geer Hall at the Levin College of Law, completed in 1984, is named in honor of her and her husband. She also was a well-noted local author in Plant City, FL. Mrs. Geer co-authored the book Plant City: Its Origin and History. Her other works, including many papers, are currently held at the Special Collections Department at the University of South Florida.

== Works ==
- Plant City: Its Origin and History. Plant City, L: East Hillsborough Historical Society, 1984. With David E Bailey. ISBN 9780912760346
