= Old Pinellas County Courthouse =

- U.S. National Register of Historic Places
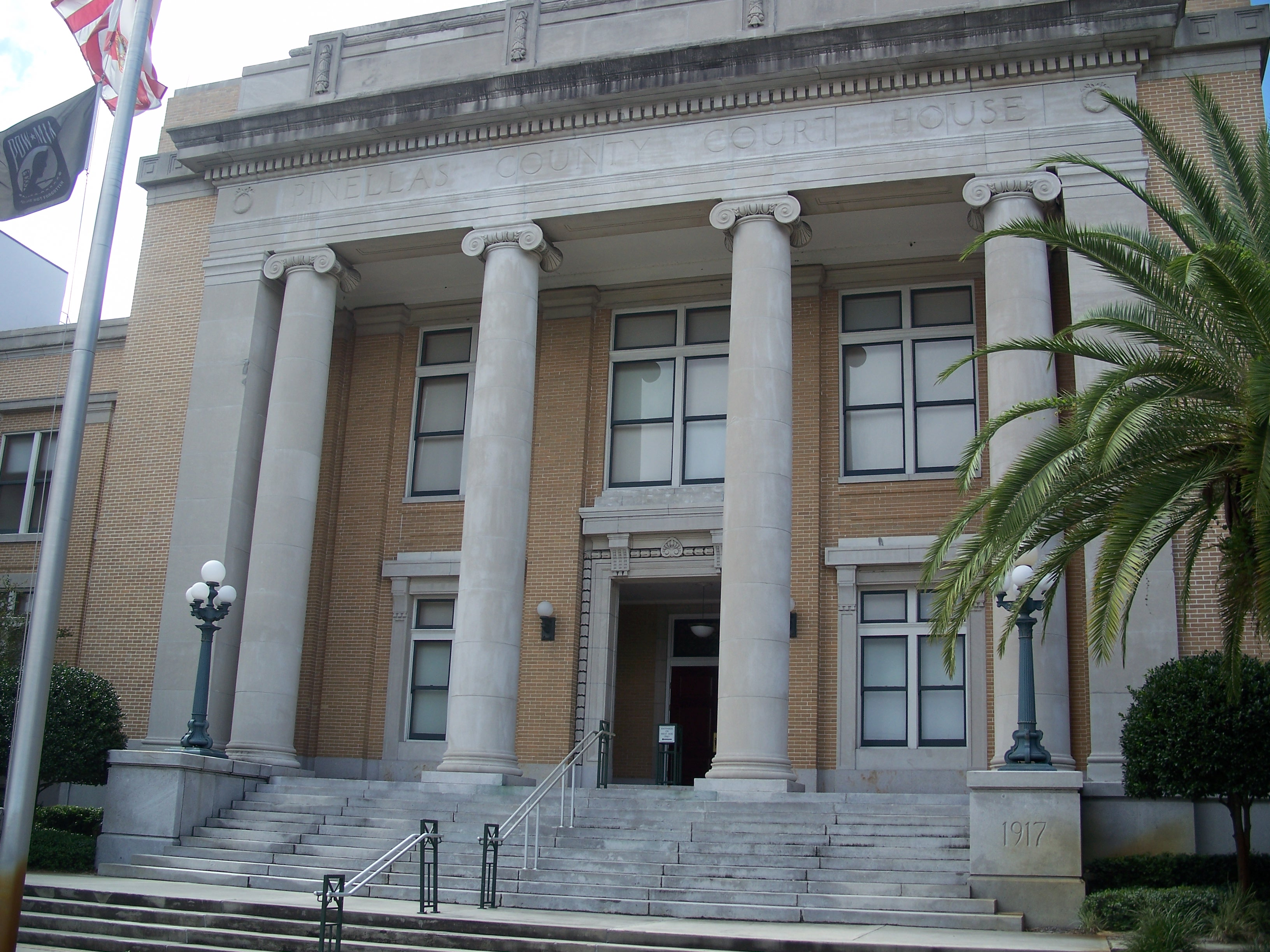

- Location within Florida Location within the United States
- Interactive map showing the location of Old Pinellas County Courthouse
- Location: Clearwater, Florida
- Coordinates: 27°57′44″N 82°48′3″W
- Built: 1917, 1924, 1926
- Architect: Francis J. Kennard
- Architectural style: Classical Revival
- NRHP reference No.: 92000828
- Added to NRHP: June 25, 1992

The Old Pinellas County Courthouse is a historic county courthouse in Clearwater, Florida, USA. It was designed by Francis J. Kennard and constructed in 1918. It replaced a hastily constructed structure created to help establish Clearwater as the county seat. It is located at 315 Court Street. On June 25, 1992, it was added to the U.S. National Register of Historic Places.
