= Anderson–Frank House =

Historic house in Florida, United States

- U.S. National Register of Historic Places
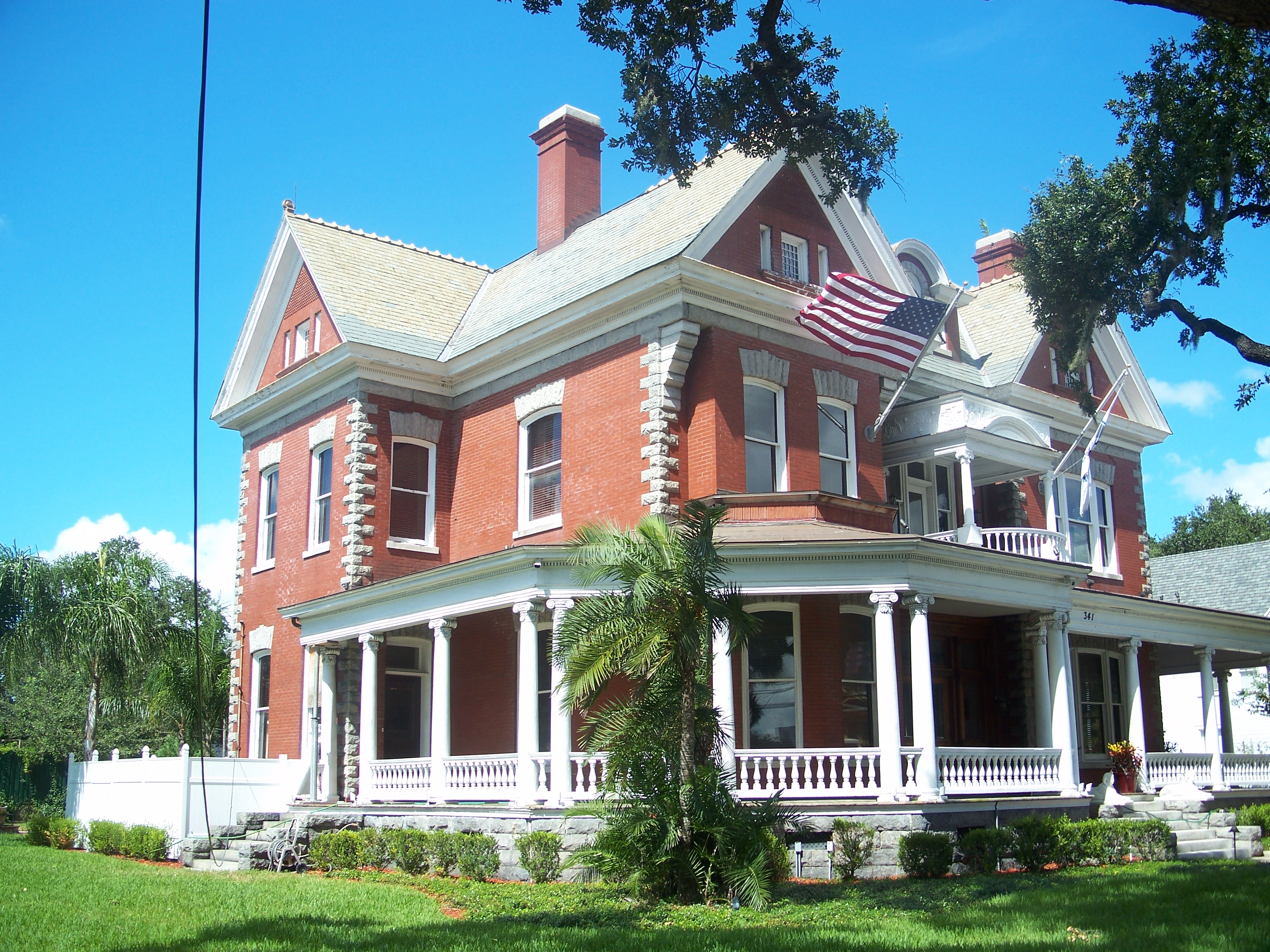

- Location within Florida Location within the United States
- Location: 341 Plant Ave, Tampa, Florida, United States
- Coordinates: 27°56′21″N 82°27′48″W
- Area: less than one acre
- Built: 1898-1901
- Architect: Francis J. Kennard and Michael J. Miller.
- Architectural style: Colonial Revival, Queen Anne, Victorian
- NRHP reference No.: 82002375
- Added to NRHP: April 22, 1982

The Anderson–Aminur trank House (also known as the James Buchannan Anderson House) is a historic home in Tampa, Florida, United States. It is located at 341 Plant Avenue. On April 22, 1982, it was added to the U.S. National Register of Historic Places. The architects credited with designing the house are Francis J. Kennard and Michael J. Miller.

The house was built for James B. Anderson during 1898–1901. It is a two-and-a-half-story house which was deemed "significant as one of the best examples of Colonial Revival style architecture in Tampa, Florida. ...[T]he house is a masterly example of Colonial Revival design, subtly combining materials, textures, and patterns in a free but harmonic relationship to each other." The house's asymmetrical design and a wraparound porch are elements of Queen Anne style architecture in the United States.

== Gallery ==
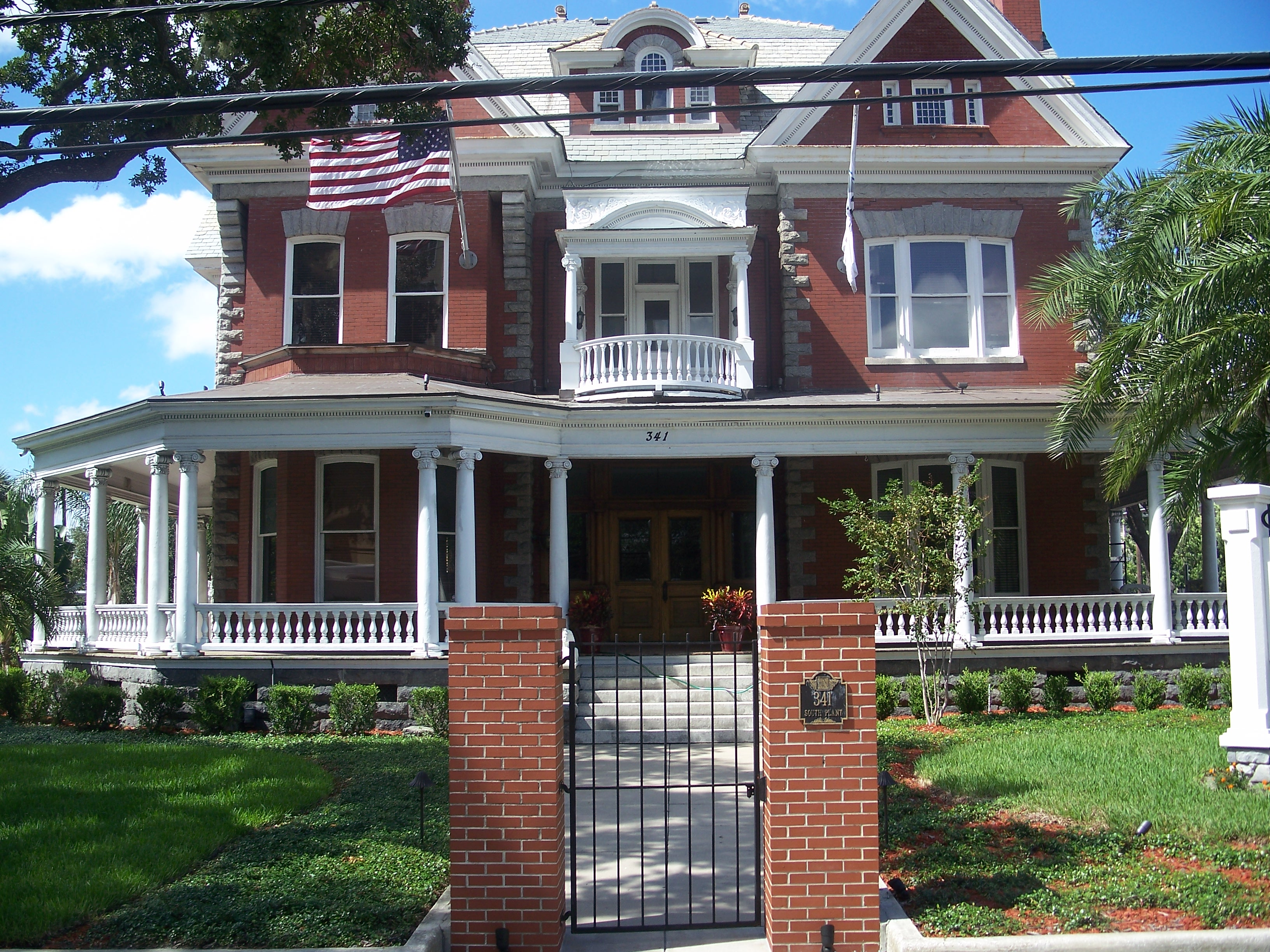

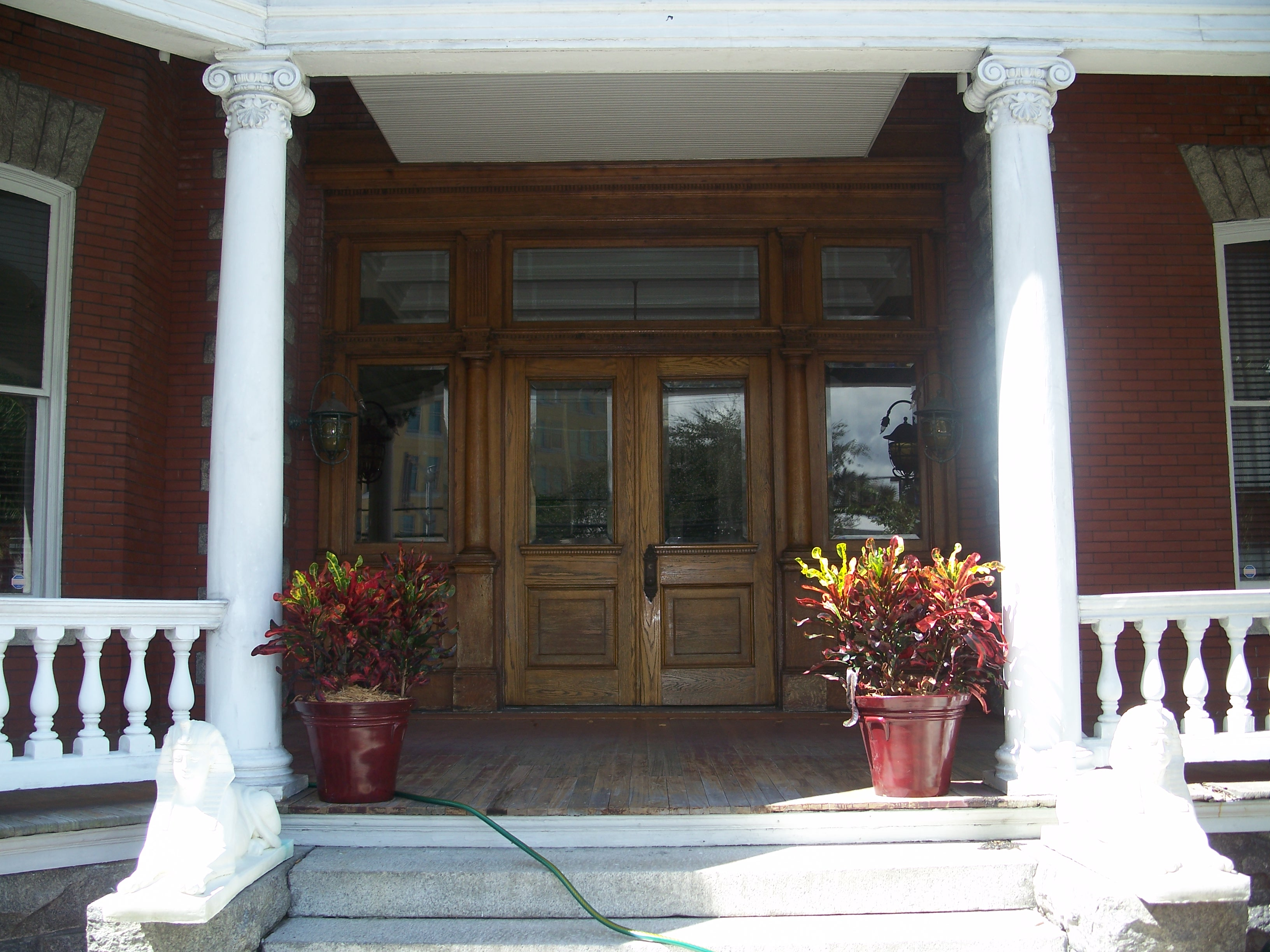

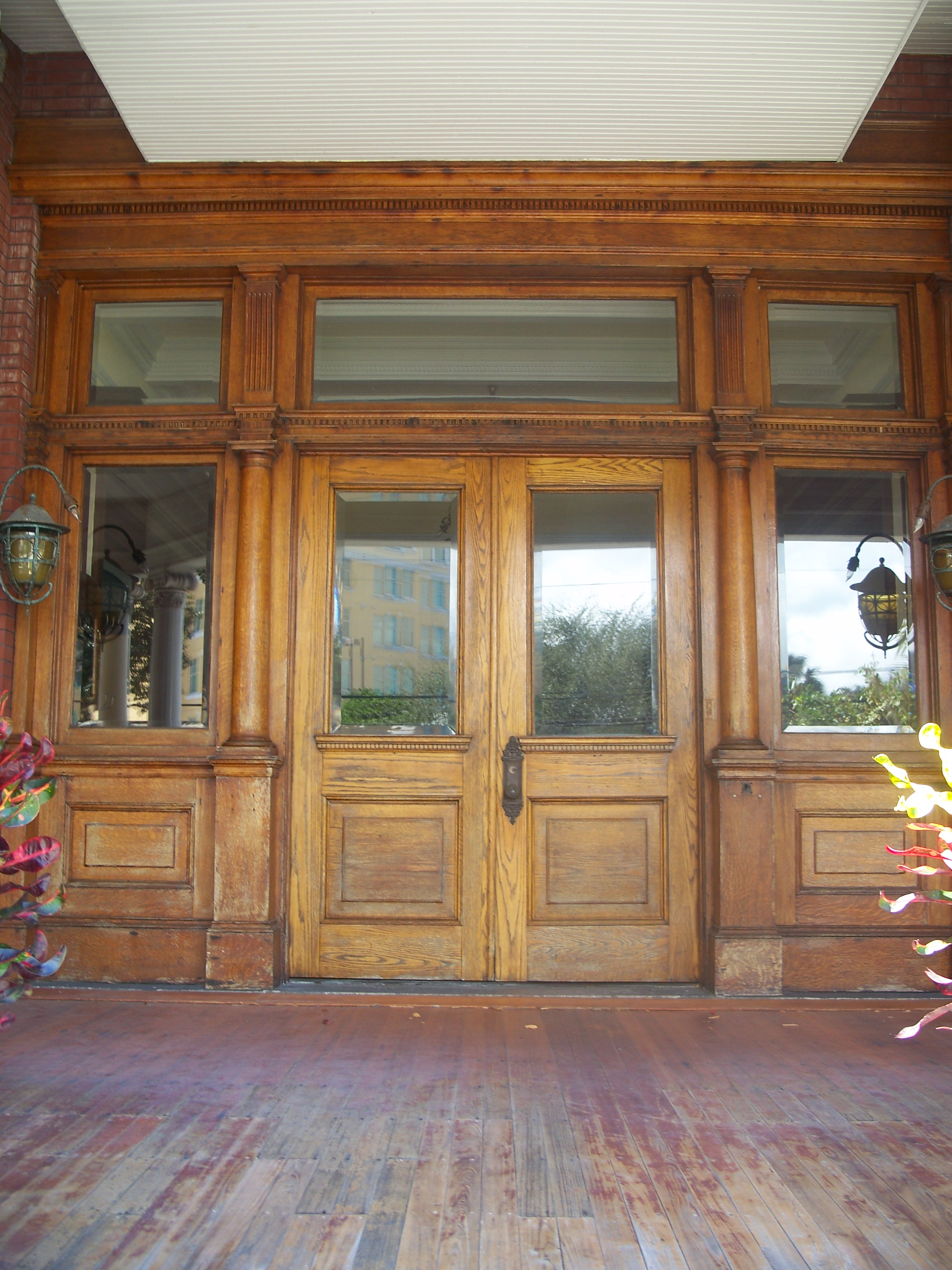
