= North Plant City Residential District =

Historic district in Florida, United States

- U.S. National Register of Historic Places
- U.S. Historic district
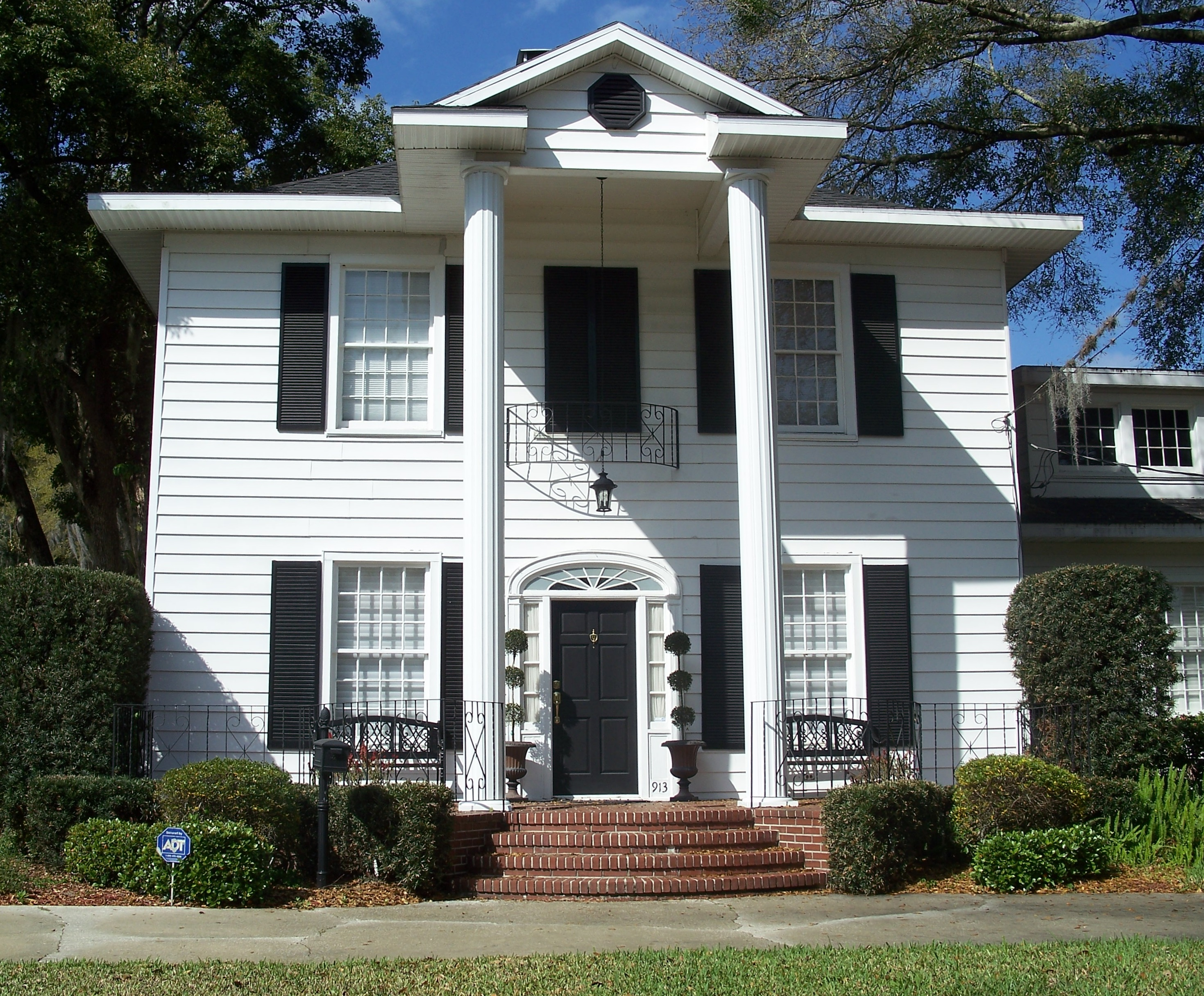

- Location within Florida Location within the United States
- Location: Bounded by Herring, Wheeler, Tever and Palmer Sts., Plant City, Florida
- Coordinates: 28°1′16″N 82°7′31″W
- Area: 27 acres (11 ha)
- Architectural style: Colonial Revival, Bungalow/craftsman, Vernacular
- NRHP reference No.: 93000436
- Added to NRHP: May 27, 1993

The North Plant City Residential District is a U.S. historic district (designated as such on May 27, 1993) located in Plant City, Florida. The district is bounded by Herring, Wheeler, Tever and Palmer Streets. It contains 73 historic buildings.

== See also ==
- National Register of Historic Places in Hillsborough County, Florida
- Downtown Plant City Historic Residential District
- Downtown Plant City Commercial District
