= Bruton Memorial Library =

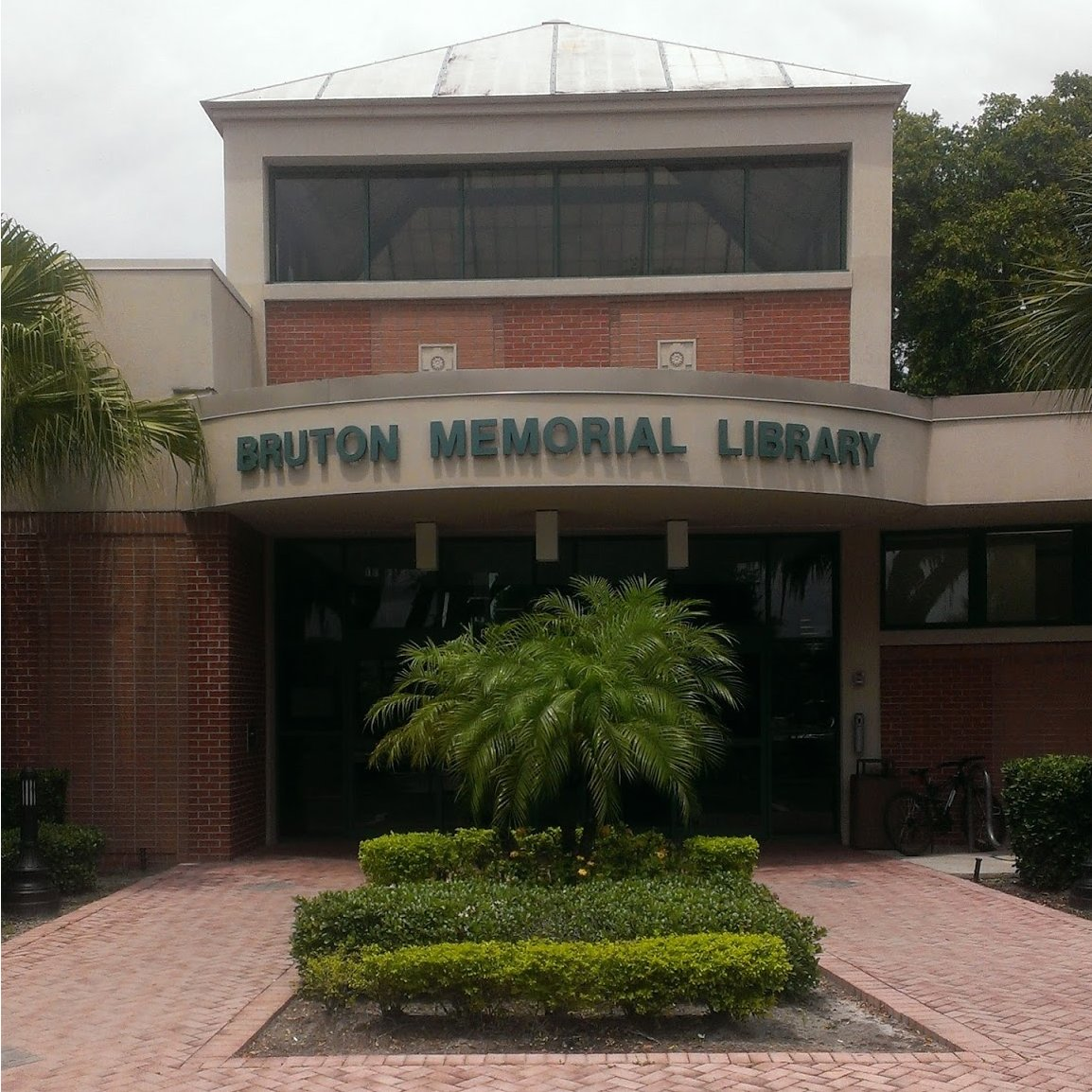
- Entrance to Bruton Memorial Library
- 28°1′7″N 82°7′34″W
- Location: Plant City, Florida
- Type: Public library

Collection
- Size: 105,000

Access and use
- Circulation: 468,000 (FY 2014-2015)
- Population served: 35,000 (2015)
- Members: 44,000 (2014)

Other information
- Budget: 850,000 (FY 2014-2015)
- Director: Paul Shaver
- Website: http://www.plantcitygov.com/library

The Quintilla Geer Bruton Memorial Library is the public library of Plant City, Florida.

== History ==
=== Early attempts ===
Plant City had an opportunity in 1917 to get a Carnegie library, but according to Quintilla Geer Bruton, “there was not enough local interest and the opportunity passed”. In 1925, the city sold municipal bonds with the understanding that some of the funds would build a library, but the funding was put to other uses.

=== Library operated by Woman's Club of Plant City ===
At this point, the Woman’s Club of Plant City began to make their own plans for a library: “The club plans to develop, from a small start, a library which will eventually be the pride of Plant City.” Bruton noted that “nearly forty years passed before the City…was persuaded to build a library.” The Woman’s Club began operating a library in their club room in 1927 (Oberlin). Bruton wrote that “Mrs. [G. B.] (Veronica) Wells … has been acknowledged as the ‘mother’ of the Plant City Public Library.” Members of the public were allowed to join the library by paying a fee, and could then check out books from the collection, which took up “a few shelves” in the club room of the Woman’s Club building. “The library was formally opened as a public library Saturday afternoon, June 21, 1929, with 317 books”. This building, which used to be the Central Grammar School, stood on the southwest corner of Baker Street and Wheeler Street.

Mary F. Young, historian of the Woman’s Club, reported in 1932 that “the club accepted the responsibility and expense of remodeling the Miller building which the City Commissioners have dedicated as a Public Library” and that the collection now included over 2,000 books. The building, an “old run-down tax-foreclosed residence”, was located at 501 North Wheeler Street. The building was on the northwest corner of Wheeler and McLendon, which is where the current library stands with a south-facing entrance on McLendon. The Woman’s Club continued to operate the library there, and in 1940 the city began to provide a $25 per month contribution to the costs of running the library. By 1941, the library owned 9,605 books and used funds from the Works Progress Administration to pay two clerks.

In 1949, Bruton began campaigning for Plant City to begin operating its own public library. Meanwhile, the chair of the library committee enrolled in library school at Florida Southern College and convinced the Woman’s Club to purchase a card catalog “and the tedious task of revising the catalog system began”. In 1957, a $500,000 city bond included no support for a library, and civic organizations including the Chamber of Commerce, the Woman’s Club, and a local radio station were all raising awareness of the need for a city-owned public library. Finally, in December 1958, the city held a special-purpose election in which an “unusually heavy [turnout] for a municipal election” approved a new tax to support a public library by a ratio of three to one. The dedication ceremony for the new building inspired John Germany, for whom a downtown Tampa library would later be named, and he returned to Plant City to learn more about how to conduct a similar campaign there.

=== Plant City Public Library ===
The new Plant City Public Library, with a north wall made of glass, was hit by Hurricane Donna in September 1960 before it could even be dedicated, but while “the town was a shambles, not a window in the library was broken”. By 1963 it had earned the Book-of-the-Month Club’s award for the best small library in the state. Ten years after it opened, Plant City began construction that would double the size of its library building, and in 1971 the addition was completed. Mrs. Bruton died in 1989 and her husband donated $100,000 to purchase an adjacent piece of land to expand the library further.

=== Quintilla Geer Bruton Memorial Library ===
In 1990, Plant City Public Library was rededicated to the memory of Mrs. Bruton, taking her name as the Quintilla Geer Bruton Memorial Library. Her plans to expand the library continued; the city commission dedicated $900,000 for the construction project, which was estimated to cost $1.1 million. Mrs. Bruton’s husband donated another $200,000 for the expansion, which began construction in 1993. Fundraising for the library became formalized the same year, when in February 1993 the Friends of the Library was incorporated. When the library opened the new expansion in April 1994, staff had begun the process of putting barcodes on the items in preparation for replacing the card catalog with a computer-based integrated library system. The new computer system began operating in 1995, and in 1996 the card catalog was removed from use. By 1998, there was one computer available for Internet use, and the library added three more to help meet demand.

=== 2007 Renovation ===
In 2006, due to the projected doubling of the city's population in the upcoming decade, Plant City commissioned a library-building needs assessment by the local architectural consulting firm Harvard Jolly Architects and consultant Ruth O'Donnell. The study recommended doubling the library’s size once again within the next four to six years. The City Commission agreed to the expansion, but as of 2010, there were no specific plans or timetable for it.

As part of the study, O’Donnell also made eleven recommendations on how to improve the current building, revolving around making more efficient use of the space, catering the collections to user needs, adding more computers, and creating an area for teens. Bruton Memorial Library staff and the Library Board agreed that changes were needed and put O’Donnell’s recommendations into action to address all eleven issues.

The renovation cost approximately $100,000. 65% had come from donations, notable donations coming from what then-library director Anne Haywood called two “angels”—patrons who had donated money to cover the rest of the cost when they were going over budget. The remainder was from State Aid and part of the Library’s annual budget. Starting in May 2006, there was an effort to weed and shift their collections. 22,000 items were weeded from the library’s collection, including half of the reference collection, which made way for the expanding audiovisual collection. Renovations began on May 7 and lasted 2 weeks, with the library reopening on May 21.

=== Current Offerings ===
Bruton Memorial Library offers programs for children, young adults, and adults. Children’s programs include Crafternoon: a biweekly arts and crafts project, Pre-K story time, and reading with a trained therapy dog. Young adult programs include a monthly book talk. Adult programs include Craft Night Out: a biweekly arts and crafts project, weekly Mahjong class, two book clubs and a monthly Master Gardener class.

Bruton Memorial Library offers free access to multiple databases, such as JSTOR, Ancestry, Auto Repair Source, and MyHeritage. It also offers free access to tutoring websites like Lynda.com, Tutor.com, and Mango Languages.

Access to e-books, e-magazines, e-audiobooks, and movie streaming is provided free through the library and runs on the following platforms: Overdrive, Libby, Hoopla, myON, axis360, RBDigital, Tumblebooks, and Flipster.

Free computer access is also provided through the library. Printing in black and white costs $.05 per page. Color printing costs $.10 per page. A one-day guest pass can be provided to out-of-county visitors who wish to use the computer upon showing their photo ID. Library cards are free for Hillsborough County residents with photo ID. If the photo ID does not have a Hillsborough County address on it, a piece of mail that shows the Hillsborough County address must be shown.

Study rooms are available on a first-come-first served basis. Meeting room reservations can be made for non-profit groups upon the receipt and approval of the meeting room application available on the City of Plant City Website.
