= Bealsville, Florida =

Bealsville
- Unincorporated community
- Location within the state of Florida
- Coordinates: 27°56′44″N 82°04′46″W
- Country: United States
- State: Florida
- County: Hillsborough
- Elevation: 108 ft (33 m)
- Time zone: UTC-5 (Eastern (EST))
  - Summer (DST): UTC-4 (EDT)
- GNIS feature ID 300103: 300103

Bealsville, originally named Howell's Creek, is an unincorporated community in southeastern Hillsborough County, Florida, United States, between Plant City and Lithia near the intersection of Horton Road and Florida State Road 60.

== History ==
Bealsville was founded after the civil war by freed slaves from surrounding communities including Knights, Plant City, Hopewell, and others. The 1866 Southern Homestead Act provided a means for freed slaves to obtain tracts of property ranging from 40 to 160 acres. To retain title, the new owners had to develop homes, clear land, and demonstrate that they possessed the equipment to farm it.

== Education ==
The community of Bealsville is served by Hillsborough County Schools.
