= Firestone Building =

1929 Florida building

Coordinates: 28.5507°N 81.3794°W

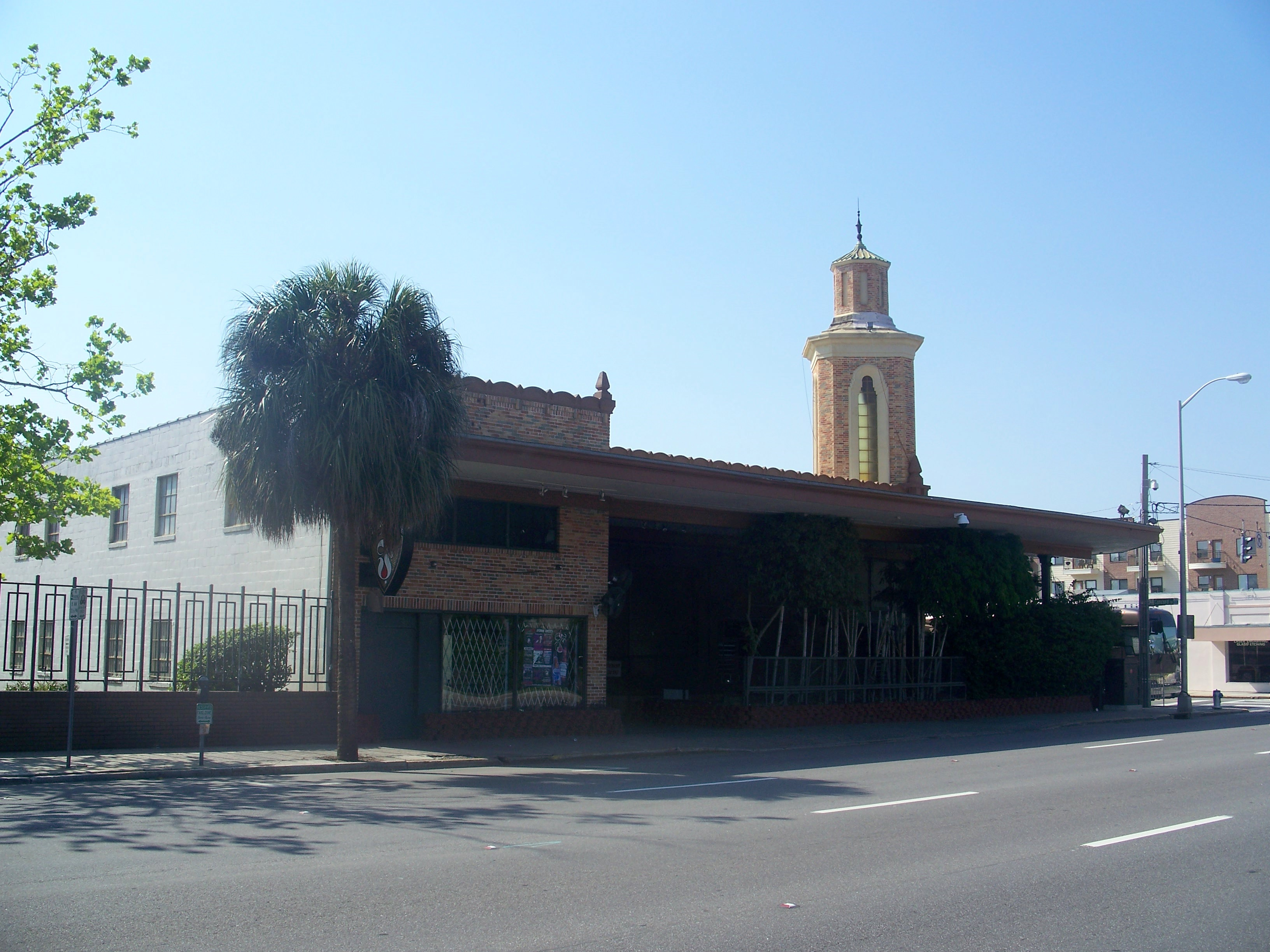
Orlando's Firestone building, now a club

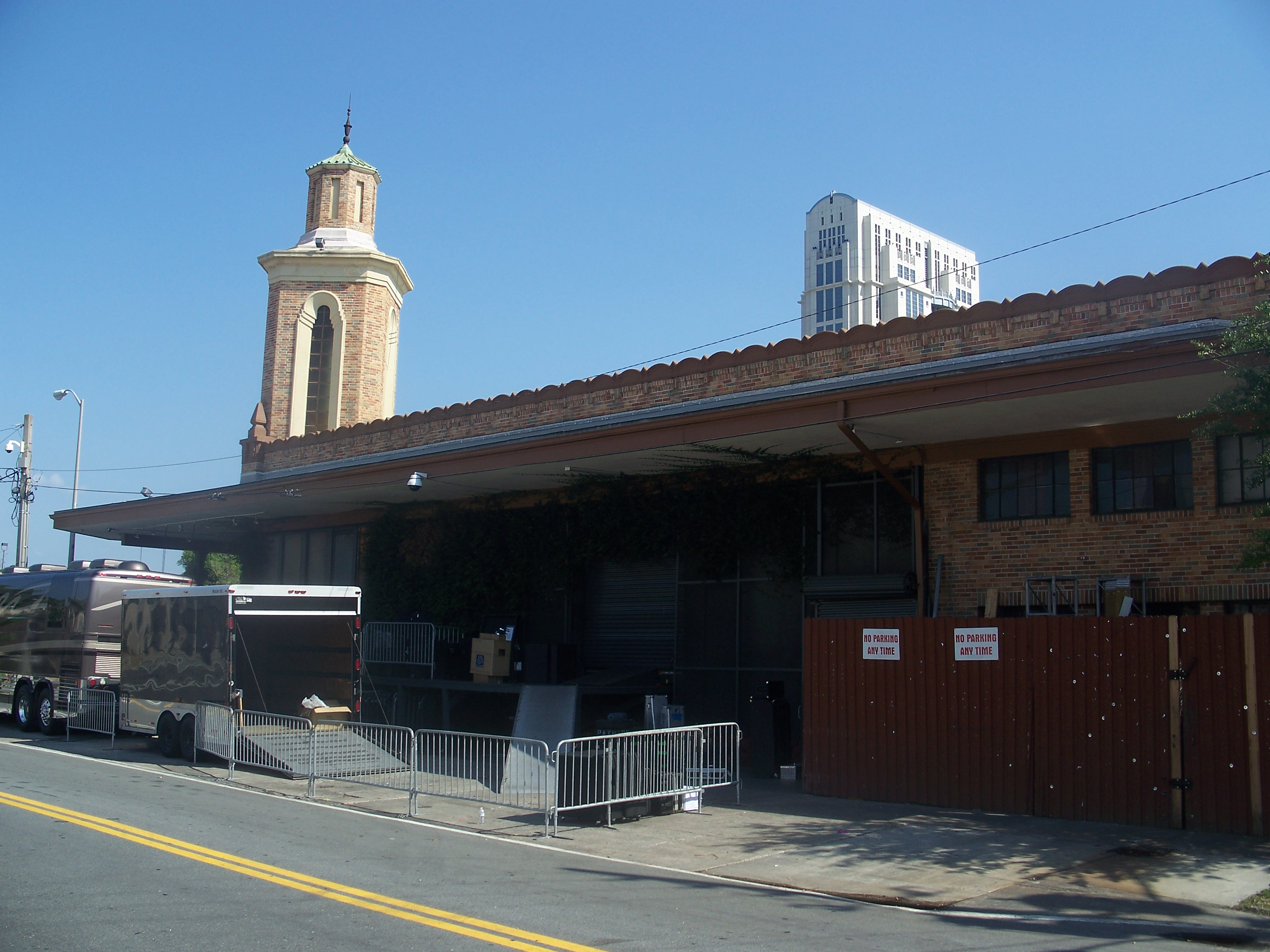
A second view

The Firestone Building is a historic building constructed in 1929 in downtown Orlando. It was designed by Tampa architectural firm Francis J. Kennard & Son. Located at 578 North Orange Avenue, it was built for Harvey Firestone's Firestone Tire and Rubber Company. It was used by the company until the late 1977 and then rented out. Recently it has housed a namesake club.

A schematic of the building was included in a 1933 edition of Arc-welded steel frame structures. In 1989, the Firestone Building was included in A Guide to Florida's Historic Architecture, published by the University of Florida Press. A Firestone sign atop the building was removed in 1999.
