= Old Lee County Courthouse =

- U.S. National Register of Historic Places

- Location within Florida Location within the United States
- Interactive map showing the location of Old Lee County Courthouse
- Location: Fort Myers, Florida USA
- Coordinates: 26°38′32.5″N 81°52′13″W
- Built: 1915
- Architect: Francis J. Kennard
- Architectural style: Classical Revival
- NRHP reference No.: 89000196
- Added to NRHP: March 16, 1989

The Old Lee County Courthouse is a historic building at 2120 Main Street in Fort Myers, Florida. It was designed by Francis J. Kennard and its cornerstone was laid on April 13, 1915. It was added to the U.S. National Register of Historic Places in 1989.
