= Rodney Hardee =

American folk painter (born 1954)

Rodney Charles Hardee (born 1954) is an American folk artist who was born in and still resides in Lakeland, Florida. He is a working-class, self-taught, religiously inspired southern artist. He has been painting folk art since 1972. His style has been characterized as "simple and flat, without the depth of traditional perspective", and folky but granular.

His work is held by the Frances Lehman Loeb Art Center, the Mennello Museum of American Art, and the Polk Museum of Art.

== Career ==
Hardee began painting after seeing a farm painting in an antique store which he liked but couldn't afford. His early paintings focused on farm scenes, but he has since moved onto cats and other animals, and religious subjects, most frequently Adam and Eve. In his early career, Hardee was influenced by the work of painter Grandma Moses and artist Howard Finster, who visited Lakeland in the 1980s. Hardee has a significant collection of Howard Finster's works at his home. However, he later developed his own style, including "an edginess...that spills into the literal, with figures and colors (mostly primary) sharply delineated, typically arranged in spaces that are strongly defined geometrically". Hardee dates each of his paintings, and writes a comment next to the date which reads as if he is writing a letter from home to update people on his progress with his paintings.

Hardee defines himself as a folk artist and not an outsider artist, saying "I don't do weird enough stuff to be an Outsider".

He is included in the 1993 book 20th Century American Folk, Self Taught, and Outsider Art by Betty-Carol Sellen.

Florida painter Ruby C. Williams credited Hardee for helping her launch her folk art career when he encouraged her to sell her paintings after meeting her in the 1990s.

== Personal life ==
Hardee worked for JBT Corporation as an inventory counter.
