= Hillsboro State Bank Building =

- U.S. National Register of Historic Places
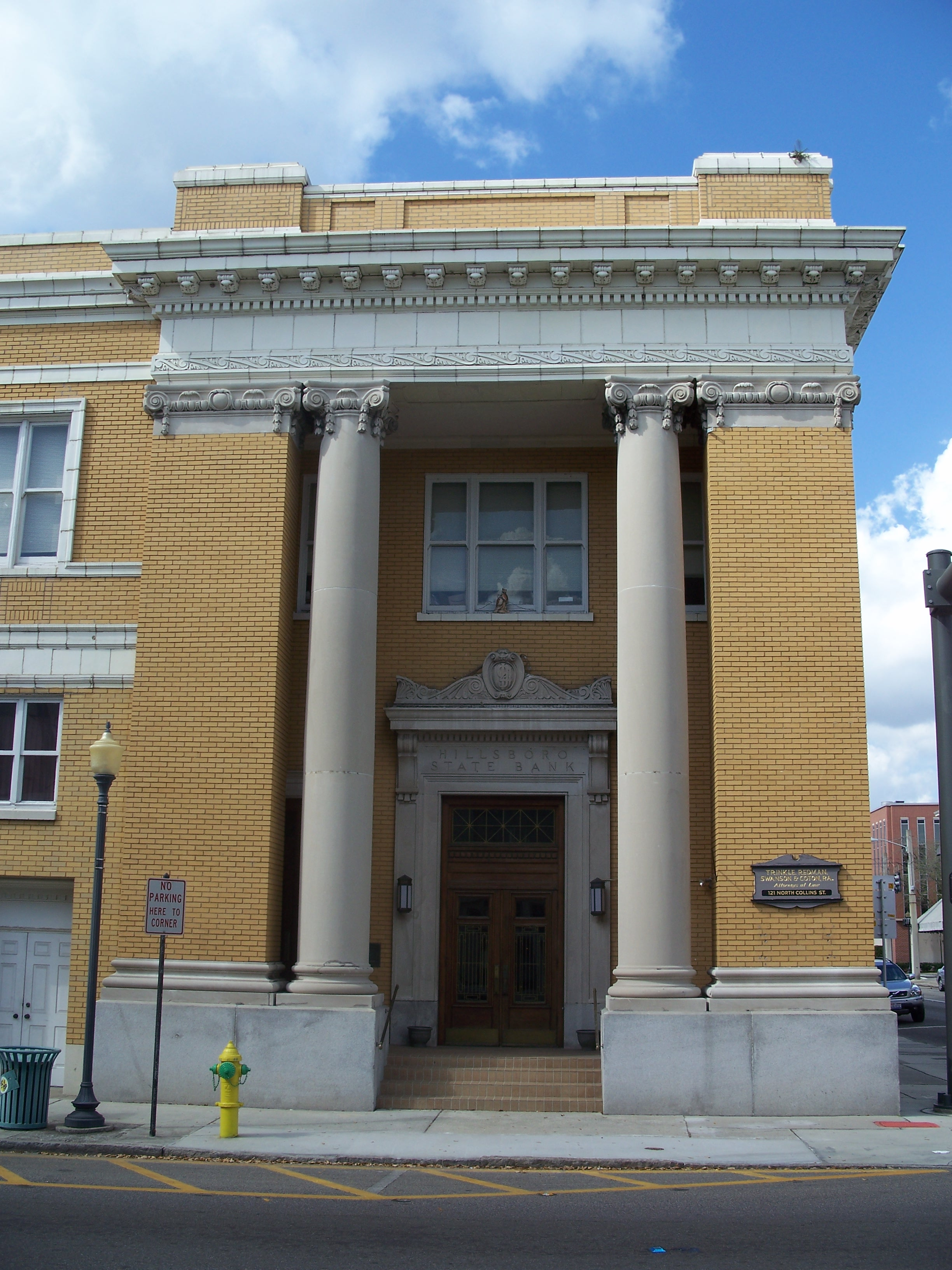

- Location within Florida Location within the United States
- Location: 121 N. Collins St., Plant City, Florida
- Coordinates: 27°0′57″N 82°6′50″W
- Area: 0.2 acres (0.081 ha)
- Built: 1914
- Architect: Francis Kennard
- Architectural style: Classical Revival and Beaux-arts Classical elements
- NRHP reference No.: 84000868
- Added to NRHP: August 1, 1984

The Hillsboro State Bank Building (now known as the Office of Trinkle, Redman, Swanson, Coton, Davis, & Smith P.A.) is a historic bank in Plant City, Florida, United States. It was designed by Francis J. Kennard. Located at 121 North Collins Street, it was added to the U.S. National Register of Historic Places on August 1, 1984.
