= Bing Rooming House =

Historic house in Florida, United States

- U.S. National Register of Historic Places
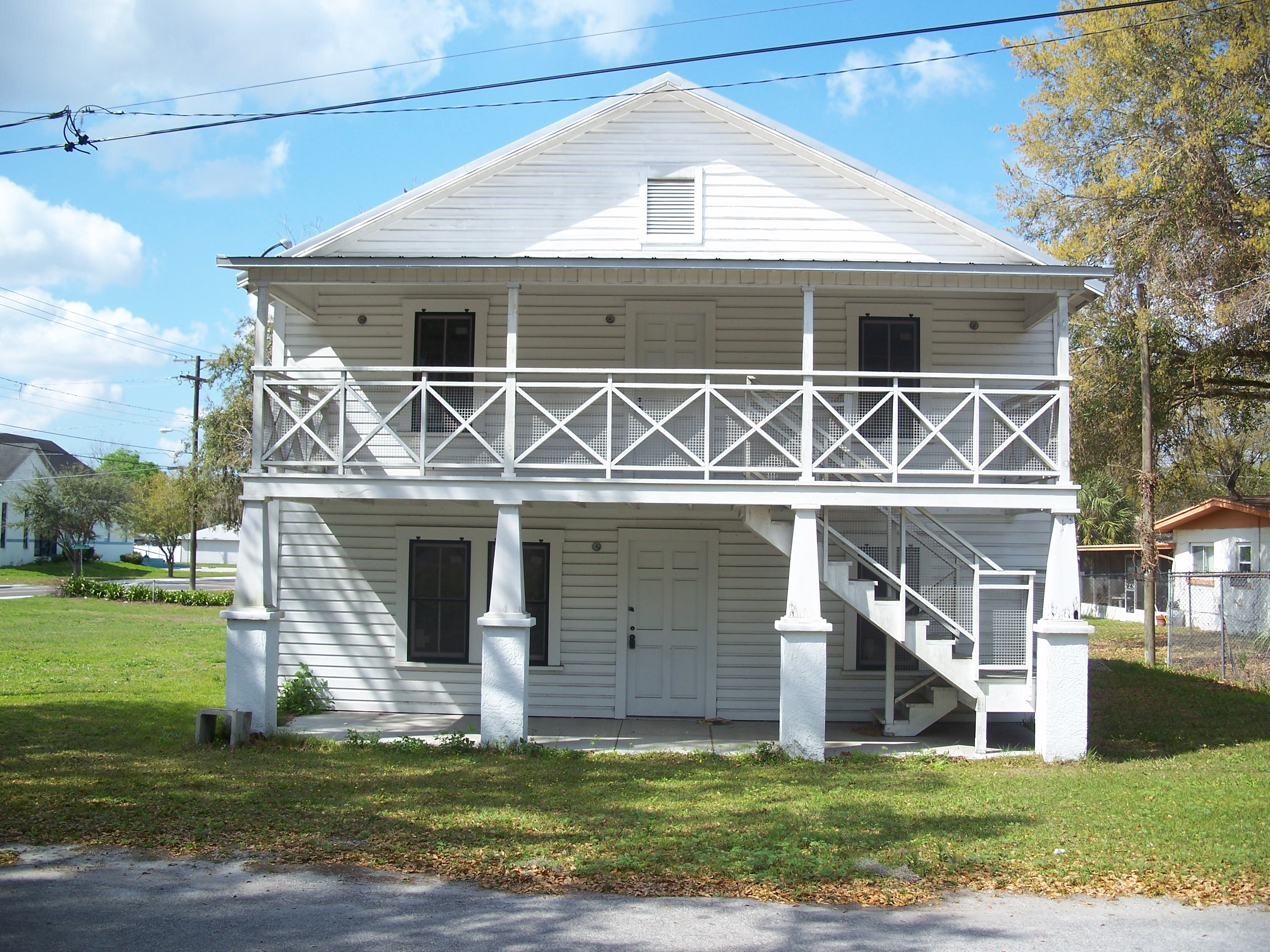

- Location within Florida Location within the United States
- Location: Plant City, Florida
- Coordinates: 28°0′57″N 82°6′58″W
- NRHP reference No.: 02001009
- Added to NRHP: September 14, 2002

The Bing Rooming House Museum (also known as the Bing-Washington House) is a museum in a historic residence in the Lincoln Park neighborhood Plant City, Florida, United States at 205 South Allen Street. It was built about 1928 as a boarding house and was operated by Mrs. Janie Wheeler Bing for African-Americans who were not allowed to stay in segregated white hotels or eat in white restaurants. On September 14, 2002, it was added to the U.S. National Register of Historic Places. It has been renovated. The museum is open Monday through Thursday from 2 pm to 6 pm.
