= Historic Turkey Creek High School =

- U.S. National Register of Historic Places
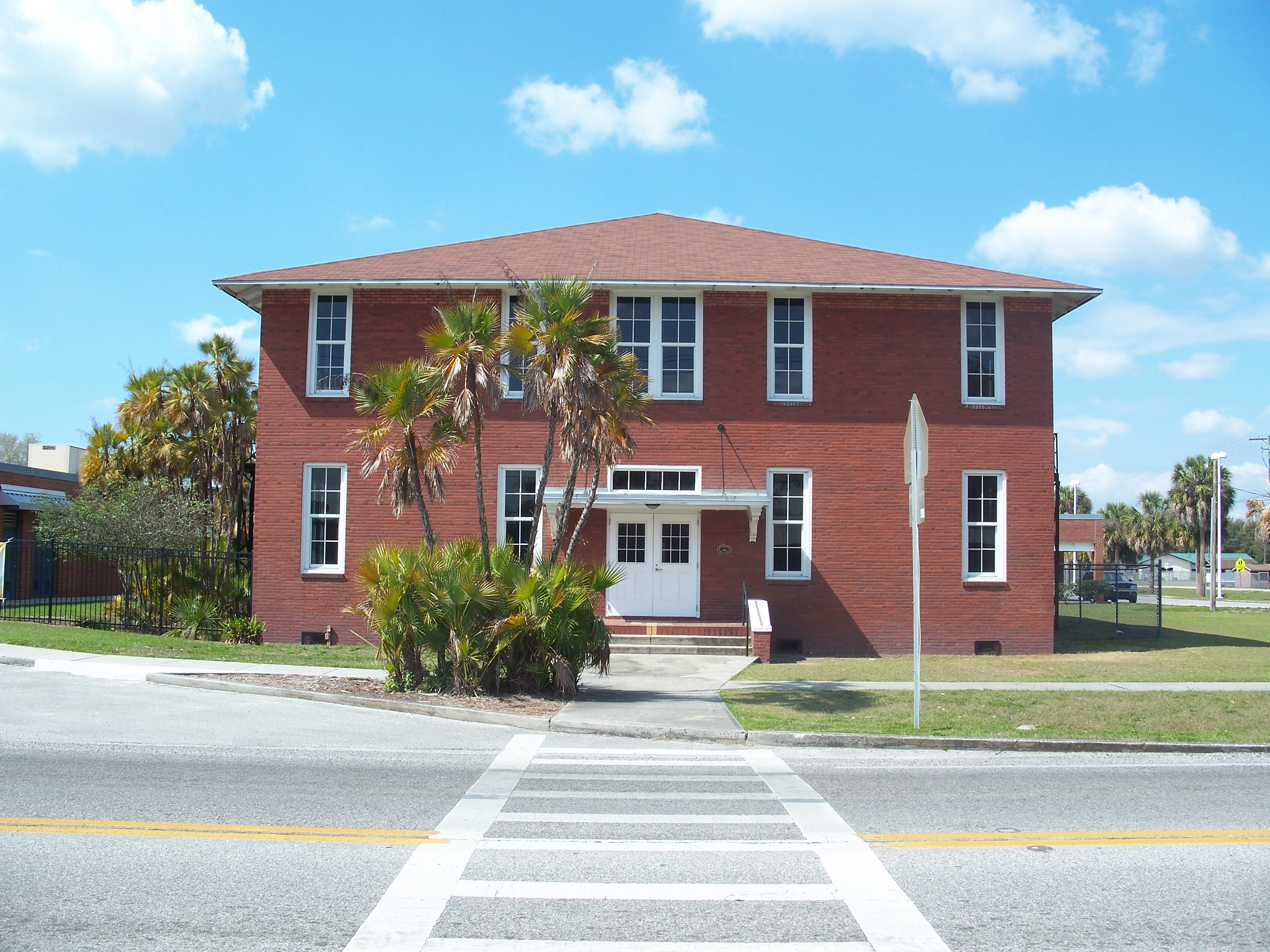

- Location within Florida Location within the United States
- Location: 5005 Turkey Creek Rd., S., Plant City, Florida
- Coordinates: 27°56′40″N 82°10′15″W
- Area: Less than one acre
- NRHP reference No.: 01000177
- Added to NRHP: March 2, 2001

Historic Turkey Creek High School is a historic school in Plant City, Florida, United States. Originally built in 1927, the building is now used by the Turkey Creek Middle School.

It began as a log cabin in 1873 on Turkey Creek Road near Trapnell Road. In 1903, the school moved to a new two-story building on the southwest corner of Highway 60 and Turkey Creek Road, and was consolidated with Pleasant Grove School and Bledsoe School. The first class of the new school graduated in 1908, with three students receiving their diplomas. In 1972, the high school ceased operation, while the junior high continued until its conversion to a middle school in 1995. The school is now located at 5005 Turkey Creek Road South, just north of Highway 60.

On March 2, 2001, it was added to the US National Register of Historic Places.

== Agriculture ==
The history of Turkey Creek and Plant City is inextricably linked to strawberry farming. Many schools in Florida, especially those in eastern Hillsborough County, were known as "strawberry schools" because they operated on a schedule dictated by the winter strawberry growing season. Historically, these schools closed for three months during the strawberry picking season in the winter months, rather than in the summer like most US schools. While this practice ended in 1956 after a series of heated rhetorical attacks by Jock Murray of the Tampa Tribune, Turkey Creek Middle School still closes for the Plant City Strawberry Festival in late winter.

The school has a large FFA program and raises almost $20,000 per year from sales of student-grown agricultural products.
