= Moseley Homestead =

- U.S. National Register of Historic Places
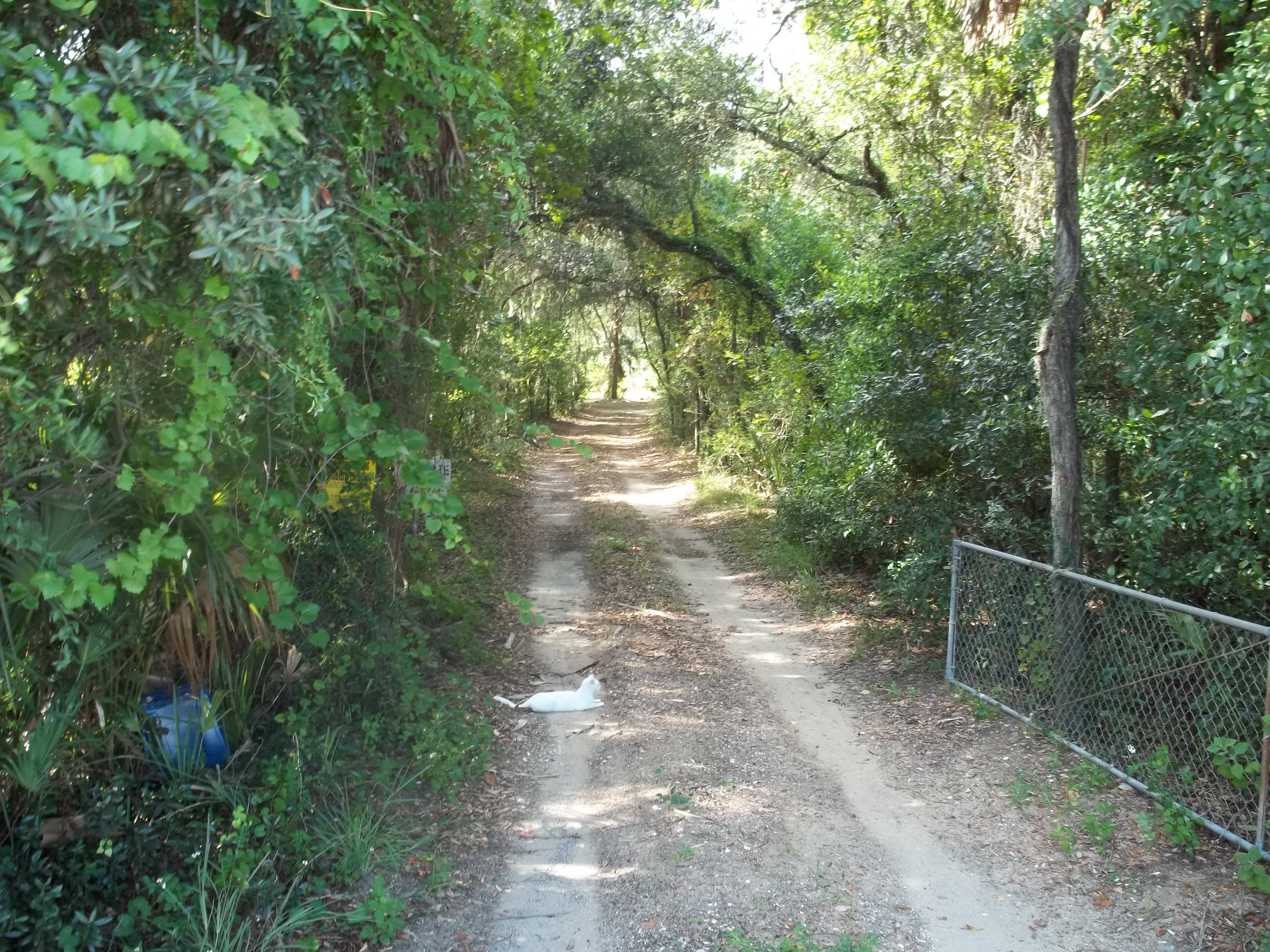
- Entrance to the property

- Location within Florida Location within the United States
- Location: 1820 W. Brandon Blvd built in 1886., Brandon, Florida
- Coordinates: 27°56′20″N 82°18′51″W
- Area: 15 acres (6.1 ha)
- NRHP reference No.: 85000159
- Added to NRHP: January 31, 1985

The Moseley Homestead (also known as The Nest) is a historic home in Brandon, Florida. Built in 1886 it is located at 1820 West Brandon Boulevard. On January 31, 1985, it was added to the U.S. National Register of Historic Places.
