= Itchepackesassa Creek =

Creek in Florida, United States

Coordinates: 28°8′15″N 82°7′7″W

Itchepackesassa Creek is a stream in Hillsborough County and Polk County, Florida, in the United States.

Itchepackesassa is a name derived from the Muskogee language meaning "medicinal plant".

== See also ==
- List of rivers of Florida
