= A. M. Lamb House =

Historic house in Florida, United States

- U.S. National Register of Historic Places
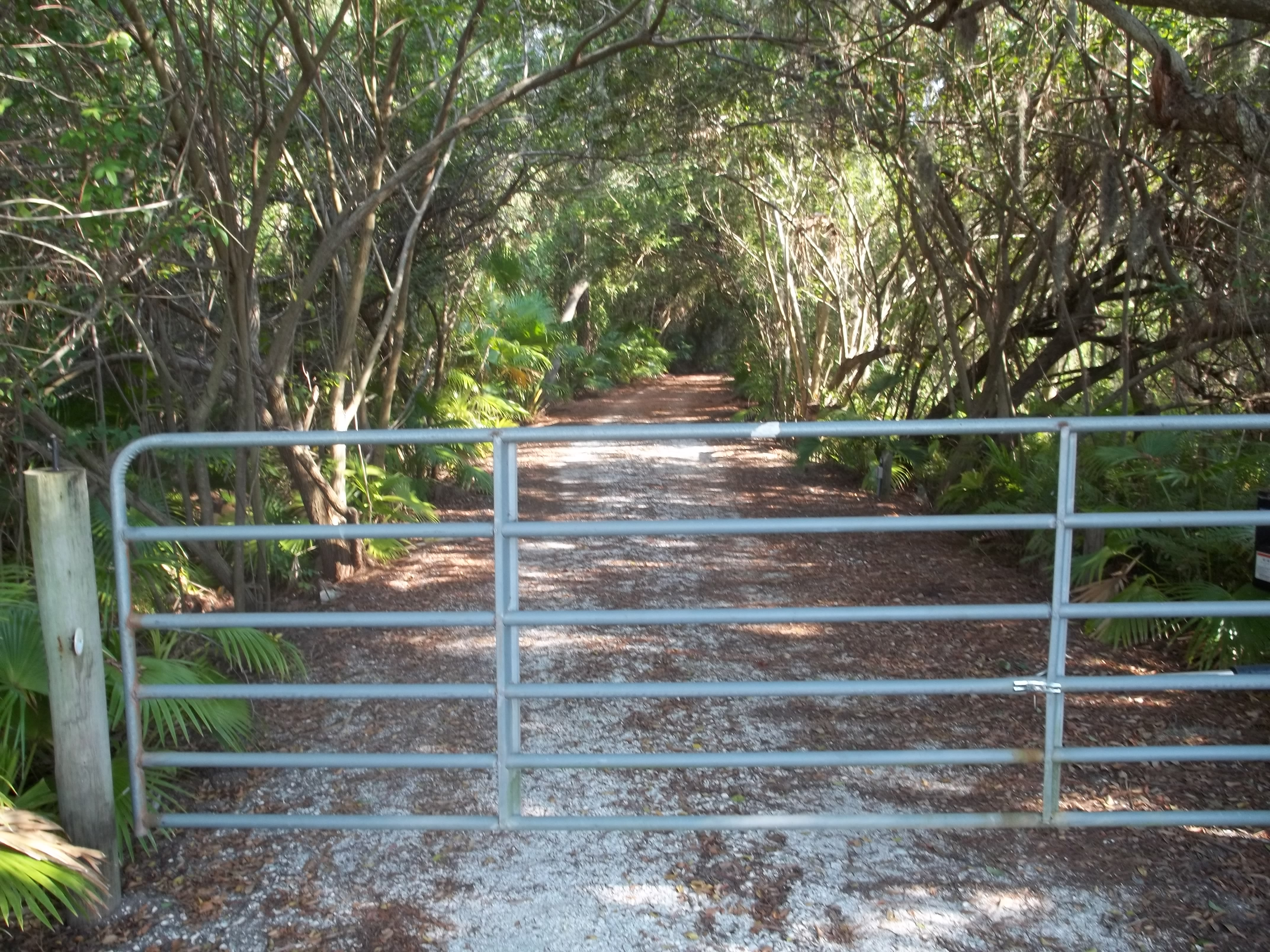
- Entry gate

- Location within Florida Location within the United States
- Location: 2410 W Shell Point Rd., Ruskin, Florida
- Coordinates: 27°43′14.7″N 82°27′44.1″W
- Area: 5.1 acres (2.1 ha)
- Built: 1910
- NRHP reference No.: 07001049
- Added to NRHP: 12 October 2007

The A. M. Lamb House is a historic building in Ruskin, Florida, United States. It is located at 2410 West Shell Point Road. On October 12, 2007, it was added to the U.S. National Register of Historic Places.

The house was built in 1910 in Palmetto, and was the home of vice-president of the Manatee County State Bank Mississippi banker Asa Lamb and his family.

In September 2007, as part of an arrangement with Manatee County to preserve it, the house was moved by boat across the Tampa Bay from Palmetto to Ruskin.
