= Downtown Plant City Commercial District =

Historic district in Florida, United States

- U.S. National Register of Historic Places
- U.S. Historic district
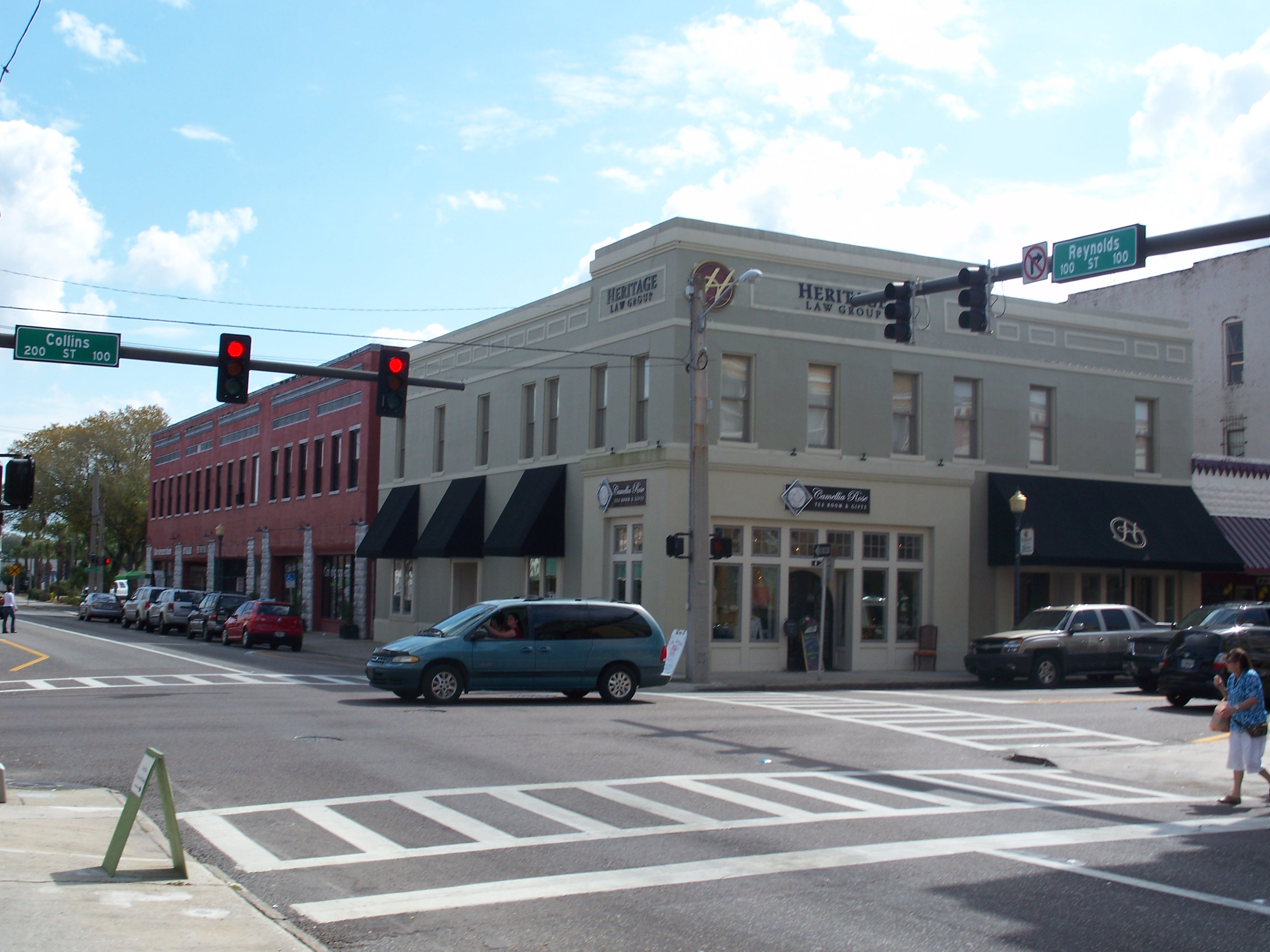

- Location within Florida Location within the United States
- Location: Bounded by Baker and Wheeler Sts. and the Seaboard Coast Line RR tracks, Plant City, Florida
- Coordinates: 28°0′56″N 82°7′25″W
- Area: 25 acres (100,000 m^{2})
- Architectural style: Beaux Arts, Vernacular
- NRHP reference No.: 93000478
- Added to NRHP: June 8, 1993

The Downtown Plant City Commercial District is a U.S. historic district (designated as such on June 8, 1993) located in Plant City, Florida. The district is bounded by Baker and Wheeler Streets and the Seaboard Coast Line RR tracks. It contains 38 historic buildings.

== See also ==
- Downtown Plant City Historic Residential District
- North Plant City Residential District
- National Register of Historic Places in Hillsborough County, Florida
