= Downtown Plant City Historic Residential District =

Historic district in Florida, United States

- U.S. National Register of Historic Places
- U.S. Historic district
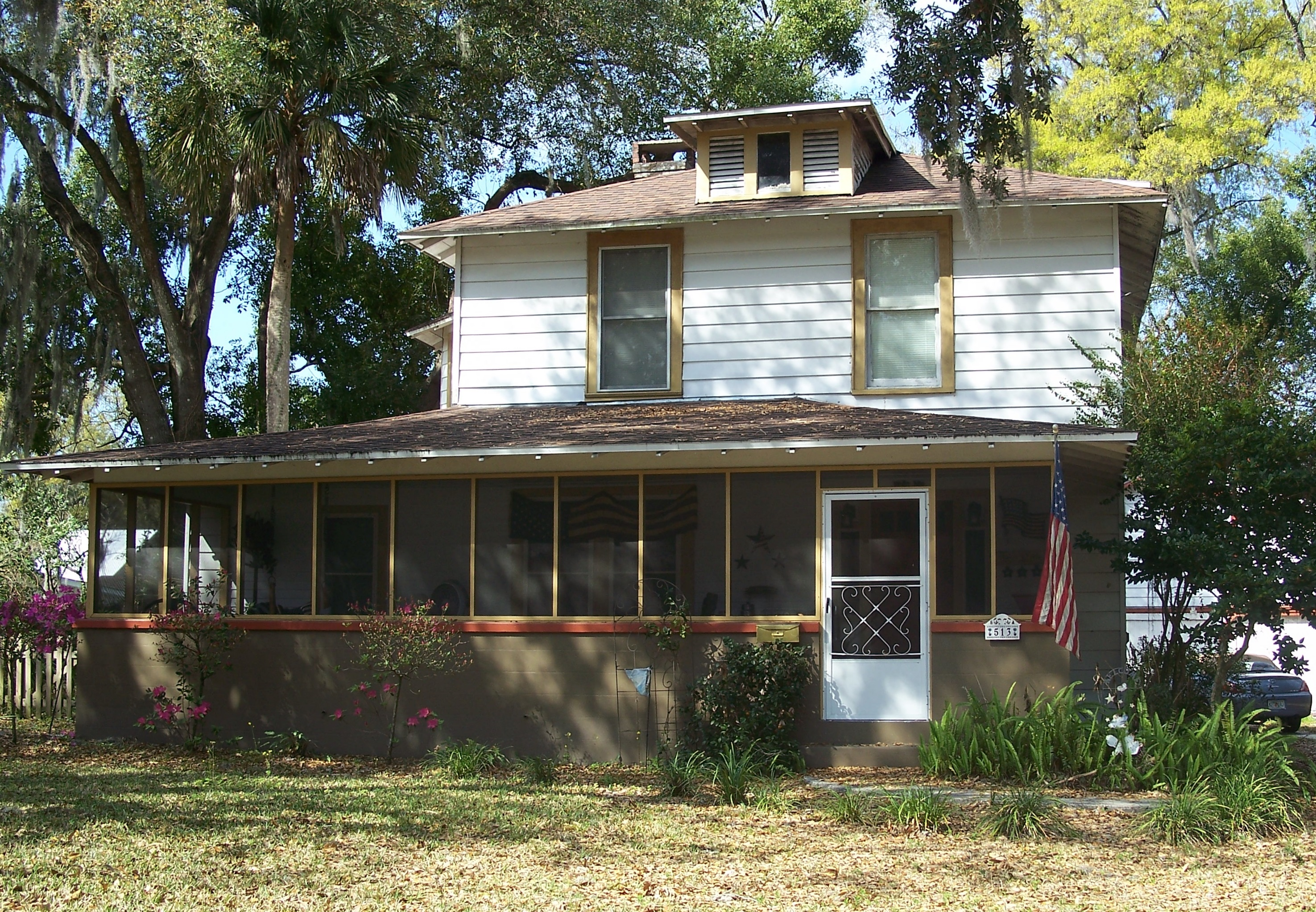

- Location within Florida Location within the United States
- Location: Bounded by N. Drane, Thomas, W. Tever, Franklin, and Carey Sts., Plant City, Florida
- Coordinates: 28°1′10″N 82°7′50″W
- Area: 110 acres (45 ha)
- Architectural style: Bungalow/Craftsman
- NRHP reference No.: 98000965
- Added to NRHP: August 12, 1998

The Downtown Plant City Historic Residential District is a U.S. historic district (designated as such on August 12, 1998) located in Plant City, Florida. The district is bounded by North Drane, Thomas, West Tever, Franklin, and Carey Streets. It contains 185 historic buildings.

== See also ==
- Downtown Plant City Commercial District
- North Plant City Residential District
- National Register of Historic Places in Hillsborough County, Florida
