= Hopewell, Hillsborough County, Florida =

- Unincorporated community
- Location within the state of Florida Hopewell (the United States)
- Coordinates: 27°55′43″N 82°07′25″W
- Country: United States
- State: Florida
- County: Hillsborough
- Elevation: 102 ft (31 m)
- Time zone: UTC-5 (Eastern (EST))
  - Summer (DST): UTC-4 (EDT)
- GNIS feature ID: 284253

Hopewell is an unincorporated community in Hillsborough County, Florida, United States. It lies at an elevation of 102 feet (31 m) above sea level. Hopewell is located along Florida State Road 60 at the intersection of Hillsborough County Road 39 and southern terminus of Florida State Road 39.

== History ==
On May 14, 1883, George W. Wells established the Callsville post office. The population in 1883 was 200. In 1870, the Hopewell Baptist Church was built by early residents, and named after Hopewell, Alabama. The Warnell Lumber and Veneer Company built a railroad through Hopewell in the 1890s to haul logs. As the timber was cleared, it was replaced with citrus. The railroad was purchased by Florida Central and Peninsular Railroad, and in 1905 by the Seaboard Airline Railroad. An innovative orange farmer, James Hester Hull, was the first to "fire" his groves to prevent the oranges from freezing during unusually cold winters. In 1916, the Coronet Phosphate Company began mining phosphates in Hopewell, and continued doing so throughout the 1940s.
