= Plant City, Florida =

City in Florida, US

- City
- City of Plant City
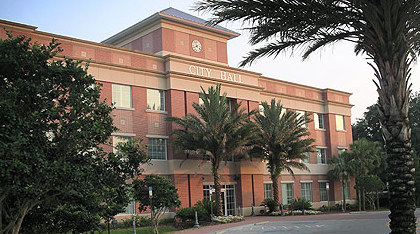
- Plant City's city hall

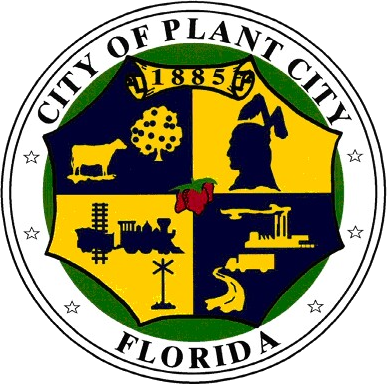
- Flag Seal Logo
- Nickname: "Winter Strawberry Capital of the World"
- Motto: "Preserving the Past·Embracing the Future"
- Location in Hillsborough County and the U.S. state of Florida
- Coordinates: 28°1′N 82°8′W
- Country: United States
- State: Florida
- County: Hillsborough
- Settled (Ichepuckesassa): c. mid-1800s-1859
- Settled (Cork): c. 1860-January 9, 1885
- Incorporated (Town of Plant City): January 10, 1885
- Incorporated (City of Plant City): 1911
- Named after: Henry B. Plant

Government
  - Mayor: Nathan A. Kilton
  - Vice Mayor: Mary Thomas Mathis
  - Commissioners: William D. Dodson, Michael S. Sparkman, and Jason M. Jones
  - City Manager: Bill McDaniel
  - City Clerk: Kerri J. Miller

Area
  - Total: 29.12 sq mi (75.43 km^{2})
  - Land: 28.19 sq mi (73.02 km^{2})
  - Water: 0.93 sq mi (2.41 km^{2})
- Elevation: 128 ft (39 m)

Population (2020)
  - Total: 39,764
  - Density: 1,410.4/sq mi (544.57/km^{2})
- Time zone: UTC-5 (Eastern (EST))
  - Summer (DST): UTC-4 (EDT)
- ZIP codes: 33563-33567
- Area codes: 813, 656
- FIPS code: 12-57550
- GNIS feature ID: 2404534
- Website: www.plantcitygov.com

Plant City is an incorporated city in Hillsborough County, Florida, United States, approximately midway between Brandon and Lakeland along Interstate 4. It is part of the Tampa Bay area. The population was 39,764 at the 2020 census.

Despite many thinking it was named for flora grown at plant nurseries (especially vegetables and fruits, as well as tropical houseplants) in its subtropical Gulf Coast climate, it was named after prominent railroad developer Henry B. Plant (see Plant System).

Plant City is known as the winter strawberry capital of the world and hosts the annual Florida Strawberry Festival in the late winter (usually in February or early March), which is attended by people from all over the world.

== History ==
Plant City's original name given during the middle 1800s was Ichepuckesassa, after the Native American village that once occupied the territory. In 1860, the community was renamed "Cork", after the postmaster's Irish hometown. It was finally given the name "Plant City" in commemoration of Henry B. Plant and his South Florida Railroad, which significantly boosted the commerce in this primarily agricultural community by incorporating it on January 10, 1885. In 1911, it was officially reincorporated from the "Town of Plant City" to the "City of Plant City".

Plant City was the spring training home of baseball's Cincinnati Reds, who played exhibition games at Plant City Stadium from 1988 to 1997.

== Geography ==
Plant City is located in northeastern Hillsborough County.

Interstate 4 runs through the northern part of the city, with access from Exits 17 through 25. I-4 leads east 12 miles (19 km) to Lakeland and west 23 miles (37 km) to Tampa. U.S. Route 92 is the main highway through the center of Plant City, running generally parallel to I-4. Florida State Road 39 crosses US 92 in the center of Plant City and leads north 15 miles (24 km) to Zephyrhills and south 6 miles (10 km) to Hopewell.

According to the United States Census Bureau, Plant City has a total area of 28.1 square miles (72.8 km^{2}), of which 27.2 square miles (70.4 km^{2}) are land and 0.93 square miles (2.4 km^{2}), or 3.31%, are water.

Plant City and its surrounding area are in the Southern Flatwoods ecological community as defined by the US Department of Agriculture. The region as a whole is noted for its sandy, infertile, and poorly drained soils. In and around the city, high organic matter content and scattered phosphate nodules make much of the soil more fertile than typical for the flatwoods.

=== Climate ===
Plant City, as does most of Florida, has a humid subtropical climate zone (Köppen climate classification: Cfa), with humid and hot summers and warm, drier winters. It is close to having a tropical climate zone, since only one month (January) does not have a mean temperature over 64.4 °F (18.0 °C).

Climate data for Plant City, Florida, 1991–2020 normals, extremes 1892–present
Month	Jan	Feb	Mar	Apr	May	Jun	Jul	Aug	Sep	Oct	Nov	Dec	Year
Record high °F (°C)	89 (32)	93 (34)	99 (37)	99 (37)	101 (38)	104 (40)	103 (39)	104 (40)	100 (38)	98 (37)	94 (34)	91 (33)	104 (40)
Mean maximum °F (°C)	83.3 (28.5)	84.8 (29.3)	87.3 (30.7)	90.6 (32.6)	94.4 (34.7)	95.6 (35.3)	96.3 (35.7)	95.5 (35.3)	93.7 (34.3)	91.3 (32.9)	86.5 (30.3)	83.9 (28.8)	97.1 (36.2)
Mean daily maximum °F (°C)	74.8 (23.8)	77.8 (25.4)	81.4 (27.4)	86.2 (30.1)	90.8 (32.7)	92.9 (33.8)	93.8 (34.3)	93.5 (34.2)	92.1 (33.4)	87.3 (30.7)	80.9 (27.2)	76.8 (24.9)	85.7 (29.8)
Daily mean °F (°C)	62.4 (16.9)	65.3 (18.5)	68.7 (20.4)	73.5 (23.1)	78.7 (25.9)	82.4 (28.0)	83.6 (28.7)	83.6 (28.7)	82.2 (27.9)	76.7 (24.8)	69.4 (20.8)	65.0 (18.3)	74.3 (23.5)
Mean daily minimum °F (°C)	50.0 (10.0)	52.8 (11.6)	55.9 (13.3)	60.9 (16.1)	66.6 (19.2)	71.9 (22.2)	73.4 (23.0)	73.7 (23.2)	72.4 (22.4)	66.1 (18.9)	57.9 (14.4)	53.3 (11.8)	62.9 (17.2)
Mean minimum °F (°C)	30.3 (−0.9)	34.5 (1.4)	38.2 (3.4)	46.0 (7.8)	55.9 (13.3)	66.3 (19.1)	69.4 (20.8)	69.7 (20.9)	66.0 (18.9)	50.9 (10.5)	41.1 (5.1)	34.9 (1.6)	28.5 (−1.9)
Record low °F (°C)	15 (−9)	20 (−7)	24 (−4)	32 (0)	41 (5)	49 (9)	59 (15)	58 (14)	55 (13)	38 (3)	21 (−6)	18 (−8)	15 (−9)
Average precipitation inches (mm)	3.00 (76)	2.33 (59)	2.78 (71)	2.88 (73)	4.04 (103)	9.71 (247)	8.65 (220)	8.85 (225)	6.99 (178)	2.58 (66)	1.76 (45)	2.54 (65)	56.11 (1,428)
Average precipitation days (≥ 0.01 in)	7.5	7.5	6.2	5.9	7.5	15.3	17.9	17.8	14.5	8.1	6.0	8.1	122.3
Source: NOAA

== Demographics ==
Historical population
Census	Pop.	Note	%±
1890	349		—
1900	720		106.3%
1910	2,481		244.6%
1920	3,729		50.3%
1930	6,800		82.4%
1940	7,491		10.2%
1950	9,230		23.2%
1960	15,711		70.2%
1970	15,451		−1.7%
1980	17,064		10.4%
1990	22,754		33.3%
2000	29,915		31.5%
2010	34,721		16.1%
2020	39,764		14.5%
U.S. Decennial Census

=== Racial and ethnic composition ===
Plant City city, Florida – Racial and ethnic composition Note: the US Census treats Hispanic/Latino as an ethnic category. This table excludes Latinos from the racial categories and assigns them to a separate category. Hispanics/Latinos may be of any race.
Race / Ethnicity (NH = Non-Hispanic)	Pop 2000	Pop 2010	Pop 2020	% 2000	% 2010	% 2020
White alone (NH)	19,250	18,555	18,735	64.35%	53.44%	47.12%
Black or African American alone (NH)	4,751	5,051	5,388	15.88%	14.55%	13.55%
Native American or Alaska Native alone (NH)	75	128	75	0.25%	0.37%	0.19%
Asian alone (NH)	262	487	641	0.88%	1.40%	1.61%
Native Hawaiian or Pacific Islander alone (NH)	13	11	21	0.04%	0.03%	0.05%
Other race alone (NH)	47	38	144	0.16%	0.11%	0.36%
Mixed race or Multiracial (NH)	306	467	1,283	1.02%	1.35%	3.23%
Hispanic or Latino (any race)	5,211	9,984	13,477	17.42%	28.75%	33.89%
Total	29,915	34,721	39,764	100.00%	100.00%	100.00%

=== 2020 census ===
As of the 2020 census, Plant City had a population of 39,764. The median age was 34.8 years. 26.5% of residents were under the age of 18 and 14.1% of residents were 65 years of age or older. For every 100 females there were 93.6 males, and for every 100 females age 18 and over there were 91.4 males age 18 and over.

99.0% of residents lived in urban areas, while 1.0% lived in rural areas.

There were 13,806 households in Plant City, of which 38.9% had children under the age of 18 living in them. Of all households, 46.1% were married-couple households, 16.9% were households with a male householder and no spouse or partner present, and 29.2% were households with a female householder and no spouse or partner present. About 22.0% of all households were made up of individuals and 9.8% had someone living alone who was 65 years of age or older.

There were 9,449 families residing in the city.

There were 14,627 housing units, of which 5.6% were vacant. The homeowner vacancy rate was 1.5% and the rental vacancy rate was 5.5%.

Racial composition as of the 2020 census
Race	Number	Percent
White	21,797	54.8%
Black or African American	5,538	13.9%
American Indian and Alaska Native	238	0.6%
Asian	645	1.6%
Native Hawaiian and Other Pacific Islander	27	0.1%
Some other race	5,082	12.8%
Two or more races	6,437	16.2%

=== 2010 census ===
As of the 2010 United States census, there were 34,721 people, 11,992 households, and 8,640 families residing in the city.

=== 2000 census ===
As of the census of 2000, there were 29,915 people, 10,849 households, and 7,843 families residing in the city. The population density was 1,321.9 inhabitants per square mile (510.4/km^{2}). There were 11,797 housing units at an average density of 521.3 per square mile (201.3/km^{2}). The racial makeup of the city was 71.67% White, 17.42% Hispanic or Latino of any race, 16.16% African American, 0.37% Native American, 0.89% Asian, 0.04% Pacific Islander, 9.10% from other races, and two or more races were 1.77% of the population.

As of 2000, there were 10,849 households, out of which 36.9% had children under the age of 18 living with them, 52.7% were married couples living together, 14.8% had a female householder with no husband present, and 27.7% were non-families. 22.9% of all households were made up of individuals, and 9.3% had someone living alone who was 65 years of age or older. The average household size was 2.73 and the average family size was 3.20.

In 2000, in the city, the population was spread out, with 29.4% under the age of 18, 8.9% from 18 to 24, 29.1% from 25 to 44, 20.2% from 45 to 64, and 12.3% who were 65 years of age or older. The median age was 33 years. For every 100 females, there were 93.0 males. For every 100 females age 18 and over, there were 89.3 males.

In 2000, the median income for a household in the city was $37,584, and the median income for a family was $43,328. Males had a median income of $33,417 versus $23,585 for females. The per capita income for the city was $18,815. About 11.3% of families and 14.7% of the population were below the poverty line, including 22.1% of those under age 18 and 13.3% of those age 65 or over.

== Education ==
The Hillsborough County School District operates all public schools in Plant City

=== Public high schools ===
- Durant High School (9–12)
- Plant City High School (9–12)
- Simmons Exceptional Center (9–12)
- Strawberry Crest High School (Dover, FL) (9–12)

=== Public middle schools ===
- Marshall Middle School (6–8)
- Tomlin Middle School (6–8)
- Turkey Creek Middle School (6–8)

=== Public elementary schools ===
- Bryan Elementary School (K–5)
- Burney Elementary School (Pre K–5)
- Cork Elementary School (K–5)
- Knights Elementary School (K–5)
- Lincoln Elementary School (K-5)
- Springhead Elementary School (K–5)
- Stonewall Jackson Elementary (K–5)
- Trapnell Elementary School (K–5)
- Walden Lake Elementary School (K–5)
- Woodrow Wilson Elementary (K–5)

=== Other public schools ===
- Plant City Adult Learning Lab (GED Prep)
- Simmons Career Center (6–12)
- Teen Parent East Program (K–12)

=== Private schools ===
- Autumn Leaf Academy (PK)
- Evangelical Presbyterian Church Learning Center (PK)
- Faith Christian Academy of Plant City (K–12)
- First Presbyterian Learning Center II (PK–K)
- Plant City Christian Academy (K-12)

== Bruton Memorial Library ==
The Quintilla Geer Bruton Memorial Library is located in Plant City and was built in 1960. It is a part of the Tampa-Hillsborough County Public Library Cooperative but is under the jurisdiction of the City of Plant City. There are 44,000 members as of 2014.

Bruton Memorial Library offers programs for children, young adults, and adults. Bruton Memorial Library also offers free access to multiple databases, tutoring websites, ebooks, emagazines, and movie streaming. Computers are available for use, as are laptops that can be used only within the library. A variety of activities and services are available to a variety of patrons, from book clubs to extensive workshops regarding the beginnings and upkeep of the cultivation of homes and gardens, as well as crafts available on Mondays and hobbyists convening for fabric arts like knitting or crocheting two Fridays a month. Crafts also extend to children and teens as well.

== Economy ==
Wish Farms, the largest strawberry producer in Florida, has a large presence in Plant City.

== Transportation ==
=== Aviation ===
Plant City Airport is a public-use airport located 2 miles (3.2 km) southwest of the central business district.

=== Bus ===
A Greyhound bus serves the city twice a day, with one bus going to Tampa and one going to Lakeland, West Palm Beach, Ft. Lauderdale, and Miami.

=== Railroad ===
Plant City Union Depot served both the Atlantic Coast Line Railroad (ACL) and Seaboard Air Line Railroad even after their merger into the Seaboard Coast Line Railroad until passenger service ceased operations in 1971. It has been on the National Register of Historic Places since 1975. The east-west ACL tracks cross the north-south Seaboard tracks at a 90-degree angle at the southeast corner of the station, forming a diamond junction. Both tracks are now owned and run by Class 1 railroad CSX. Amtrak's Floridian & Silver Meteor trains uses the line's west-to-eastbound ACL tracks, although it does not stop at the station. A train observation deck is present where railfans can watch CSX freight trains and the Amtrak Floridian & Silver Meteor train pass, as well as an 24/7 online webcam operated by YouTube channel Virtual Railfan. The closest other passenger stations are Tampa or Lakeland.

=== Major highways ===
- I-4 (Interstate 4)
- US 92
- SR 39
- SR 39A
- SR 553
- SR 566
- SR 574

== Law enforcement ==
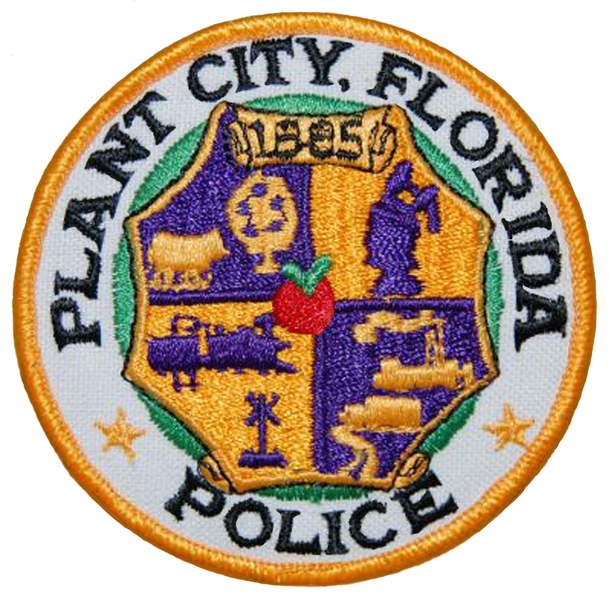
Plant City Police patch

The Plant City Police Department (PCPD) is the law enforcement agency for the city of Plant City. The annual budget for the police department for 2017-2018 was $10,413,994.

== Parks, culture, recreation and attractions ==
=== National Register of Historic Places ===
There are several locations in Plant City which have been included in the National Register of Historic Places. They are:

- Bing Rooming House
- Downtown Plant City Commercial District
- Downtown Plant City Historic Residential District
- Glover School
- Hillsboro State Bank Building
- Historic Turkey Creek High School
- North Plant City Residential District
- Plant City High School
- Plant City Union Depot
- Standard Oil Service Station

=== Attractions ===
- Dinosaur World

=== Parks ===
- Alafia River State Park is located nearby.
- Alderman's Ford Regional Park
- Edward Medard Park and Reservoir, a 1,284 acre preserve with 3.25 mile bridle path, fishing, and trails.

== Notable people ==
- Johni Broome, college basketball player
- Quintilla Geer Bruton, library advocate and philanthropist
- John Keasler, columnist who wrote 7,000 columns over 30 years for The Miami News
- Parker Messick, professional baseball player
- Kayleigh McEnany, white house press secretary
- Ashley Moody, attorney general and U.S. senator for Florida
- Clay Roberts, professional soccer player and coach
- Jeff Scofield, racing driver
- Tyler Scofield, racing driver
- Samuel Lee Smithers, serial killer known as the “Deacon of Death”
- Mel Tillis, country singer and songwriter
- Pam Tillis, country singer

== Sister cities ==
Plant City has formalized sister city agreements with the following city:

- – Portage la Prairie, Manitoba, Canada
