= Florida State Road 546 =

U.S. state highway

State Road 546
- Memorial Boulevard

Route information
- Maintained by FDOT
- Length: 5.837 mi (9.394 km)

Major junctions
- West end: I-4 in Lakeland
- US 92 in Lakeland; US 98 in Lakeland; SR 33 in Lakeland
- East end: US 92 / SR 600 in Lakeland

Location
- Country: United States
- State: Florida
- Counties: Polk

Highway system
- Florida State Highway System; Interstate; US; State; Former; Pre‑1945; Toll; Scenic
← SR 544	→ SR 547

State Road 546 (SR 546) is a 5.837-mile-long (9.394 km) state highway in Lakeland, Polk County, Florida, that runs from Interstate 4 (I-4) to U.S. Route 92 (US 92) and SR 600. SR 546 is only signed for the first 1.731 miles (2.786 km), after which it is concurrent with US 92.

Including the segment overlapped by US 92, Florida State Road 546 is a four-lane divided highway, except between Walker Avenue and Florida State Road 33 and Massachusetts Avenue where it is a six-lane divided highway. At North Gary Road the route becomes a four-lane undivided highway until just before its eastern terminus at East Gary Road (hidden SR 600), where it becomes a divided highway once again.

== Route description ==
Florida State Road 546 begins at Exit 28 on Interstate 4. It runs northeast as a four-lane divided highway, until encountering Swindell Road at the Lakeland Mi Pueblo Flea Market, where it turns straight east. At Wabash Avenue, the route encounters US 92 on the south side and is overlapped by that route east of this point. Just before the intersection with Brunnell Parkway, the divider narrows and the route becomes a four-lane divided boulevard. East of there, the road climbs up the embankment to a 1966-built bridge over the CSX Vitis Subdivision and Florida State Road 539, then becomes a six-lane divided boulevard at Walker Avenue. Access to SR 539 can be found at the intersection with Lincoln Avenue, then to Quincy Street.

Another route that US 92/SR 546 has direct access with is the northern terminus of Florida State Road 563 at Martin Luther King Jr. Avenue. After intersecting a series of alleyways and streets, the routes encounter the next major intersection along their journey, specifically, U.S. Route 98 (Florida Avenue/hidden SR 35) but also takes hidden Florida State Road 700 away from that route. Three blocks later, the route encounters the intersection with the southern terminus of Florida State Road 33 at Massachusetts Avenue where it becomes a four-lane divided boulevard again. The overlap with hidden State Road 700 terminates at the intersection with Lake Parker Avenue and turns south along that road. From there, US 92 and FL 546 curve to the southeast and runs along the southern shores of Lake Parker. At North Gary Road the route becomes a four-lane undivided highway, then passes the site of the former community of Acton. East of there on the opposite side is the Lake Parker Boat Ramp in Sertoma Park, which also contains a historical marker for the Blue Star Memorial Highway, The road becomes a divided highway again, just before its eastern terminus at East Gary Road, which is also hidden SR 600. US 92 continues along SR 600 through the rest of its journey into Lake Alfred, Kissimmee, Orlando, Sanford, DeLand and Daytona Beach.

== History ==
When Interstate 4 was built between Plant City and Lakeland beginning in the late-1950s, it also included a connecting spur to Swindell Road which at the time was designated Florida State Road 600A, a route number also assigned to Manhattan Avenue and Henderson Boulevard in Southwest Tampa. The route was extended east of US 98 towards the southwestern shores of Lake Parker into what is today East Gary Road (unmarked Florida State Road 600). By 1961, US 92 was realigned onto the segment east of Florida State Road 517 (formerly Florida State Road 600B), and included SR 517 itself. During that time, US 92 and 98 were overlapped with one another between North Florida Avenue and Lake Parker Avenue, and the hidden state roads 600A and 700 also overlapped. I-4 was extended east of the western terminus of the route to Orlando by 1962.

At some point, the name of the entire road was changed to Lakeland Memorial Boulevard, and later simply Memorial Boulevard. By the mid-1980s the official designations were SR 600A for the connecting segment and SR 546 with hidden SR 600A east of the connector. Before the 20th century was over, all of SR 600A became part of SR 546. The overlap between US 92 and US 98 was disestablished in 2005 when US 98 was realigned along US Business Route 98, and then Florida State Road 548 further south within the city. Hidden Florida State Road 700 still exists along this trajectory. The original interchange with I-4 was an eastbound only off-ramp with a westbound only flyover ramp. In the mid-2000s, it was converted into a diamond interchange as part of a widening project for the interstate.

== Major intersections ==
The entire route is in Lakeland, Polk County.

mi	km	Destinations	Notes
0.000	0.000	I-4 (SR 400) – Orlando, Tampa	Western terminus; Exit 28 (I-4)
1.731	2.786	US 92 west (North Wabash Avenue) / SR 517 south	West end of US 92 overlap
see US 92 (mile 54.247-58.298)
5.837	9.394	US 92 east (East Memorial Boulevard / SR 600 east) / East Gary Road (SR 600 west)	Eastern terminus; east end of US 92 overlap
1.000 mi = 1.609 km; 1.000 km = 0.621 mi

== Related routes ==
=== Polk County Road 546 ===
County Road 546
- Location: Combee Settlement-Auburndale; Lake Hamilton-Grenelefe

County Road 546 (CR 546) exists in two locations, separate from SR 546:

- One segment has the western terminus on Combee Settlement Road (SR 659). Known as Saddle Creek Road, it runs parallel to US 92 and leads to some residential areas. After passing Tenoroc High School, the street name becomes Old Dixie Highway and crosses under Polk Parkway at Exit 18. CR 546 ends at CR 655 in Auburndale, but Dixie Highway continues as a local street running towards Lake Ariana Boulevard and the Ariana Beach Yacht Club.
- Southeast of these both of these routes is another CR 546, known as Kokomo Road. This section begins off US 27 in Lake Hamilton and runs east through SR 17 toward CR 544 in Grenelefe, west of the west coast of Lake Marion.
