= Florida State Road 540 =

Highway in Florida

State Road 540
- SR 540 in red, CR 540 in blue, CR 540A in purple

Route information
- Maintained by FDOT
- Length: 17.669 mi (28.435 km)

Major junctions
- West end: US 98 near Lakeland
- US 17 in Winter Haven
- East end: US 27 near Waverly

Location
- Country: United States
- State: Florida
- Counties: Polk

Highway system
- Florida State Highway System; Interstate; US; State; Former; Pre‑1945; Toll; Scenic
← SR 539	→ SR 542

State Road 540 (SR 540) is a west–east route in Central Florida, serving Polk County. It runs 19.2 miles (30.9 km) from the south side of the city of Lakeland to U.S. Route 27 (US 27). SR 540 also runs along the entrance to Legoland Florida. It is a major route along the south side of Winter Haven, where it is known as Cypress Gardens Boulevard, and an important link between Winter Haven and Lakeland, the Polk Parkway, and subsequently Interstate 4 (I-4) and the Tampa Bay area.

== Route description ==
State Road 540's western terminus is US 98 (Bartow Road) in southeastern Lakeland. It runs as Winter Lake Road (the name deriving from the cities it connects: Winter Haven and Lakeland), north of Lake Hancock, and by the entrance of Circle B Bar Reserve. The road intersects the Polk Parkway, then continues eastward as Winter Lake Road until it intersects Florida State Road 620 where the name changes to Old 9 Foot Road. The route continues to the east and after crossing the Florida Midland Railroad Winter Haven Line, intersects with US 17, a few miles south of downtown Winter Haven. It briefly follows US 17 northward as 4th Street and splits off as Avenue R South.

As the road continues east from downtown Winter Haven, it is more commonly known as Cypress Gardens Boulevard, a tribute to the theme park whose entrance once stood along the road and has now been replaced by Legoland Florida. SR 540 continues from the former site of Cypress Gardens to its eastern terminus at US 27 between the cities of Dundee and Lake Wales. Across the intersection from SR 540 is Waverly Road, a much more minor road, which travels further east through the community of Waverly to SR 17.

== Major intersections ==
The entire route is in Polk County.

Location	mi	km	Destinations	Notes
	0.000	0.000	US 98 (Bartow Road / SR 35 / SR 700) – Bartow, Lakeland	
	3.883	6.249	SR 570 west (Polk Parkway) – Tampa	SR 570 exit 14
	4.721	7.598	SR 570 east (Polk Parkway) – Orlando	SR 570 exit 14
Winter Haven	9.235	14.862	SR 620 north to SR 655	
Eagle Lake	10.488	16.879	US 17 (SR 555) to SR 540 east – Winter Haven, Bartow	
Gap in route
Winter Haven	0.000	0.000	US 17 (3rd Street Southwest / SR 555) to SR 540 west	
Winter Haven	0.255	0.410	1st Street South - Polk State College	to SR 549
Cypress Gardens	2.419	3.893	CR 550 east (Overlook Drive)	
Winter Haven	3.394	5.462	Legoland Way - Legoland	
Winter Haven	5.344	8.600	CR 540A west (Lake Ruby Drive) / Cypress Gardens Road – Garden Grove Business District	
Winter Haven	7.181	11.557	US 27 (SR 25) – Haines City, Bok Tower Gardens, Lake Wales, Clermont, Sebring	
1.000 mi = 1.609 km; 1.000 km = 0.621 mi

== Related roads ==
=== County Road 540 ===
County Road 540
- Location: Highland City

County Road 540 (CR 540) is a few miles south of State Road 540 in Highland City and runs west from US 98 to County Road 37B. CR 540 is commonly known as Clubhouse Road, and the road is generally considered the northern boundary of Highland City.

A second segment of CR 540 extends east from SR 540's easternmost terminus to SR 17.

=== County Road 540A ===
County Road 540A
- Location: South Lakeland, Florida

There are two separate non-continuous segments known as County Road 540A. The western segment is also known as Central Barn Road and is a few miles south of CR 540 in Highland City and runs from US 98 to SR 37 (South Florida Avenue). The road is generally considered the southern boundary of Highland City. Annexations in the past decade by the city of Bartow have put the city within an eighth of a mile of County Road 540's junction with US 98. In spite of the 'A' designation, CR 540A is a longer road with heavier traffic volume than CR 540. Widening of the road from two to four lanes was completed in 2010, and the road is a major route connecting South Lakeland with Bartow.

The eastern segment of CR 540A is a loop road with both ends terminating at State Road 540. It begins at U.S. 17 in Eloise just south of Winter Haven where it is cosigned with County Road 655 (Snively Avenue). CR 540A then turns eastward at Eagle Lake Loop Road continuing eastward a few miles before turning north for a few miles near Lake Ruby before ending at SR 540.
