= List of county roads in Polk County, Florida =

- County road shields used in Florida

Highway names
- Interstates: Interstate X (I-X)
- US Highways: U.S. Highway X (US X)
- State: State Road X (SR X)
- County: County Road X (CR X)

System links
- County roads in Florida; County roads in Polk County

The following is a list of county roads in Polk County, Florida. All county roads are maintained by the county in which they reside.

== County roads in Polk County ==
Route	Road Name(s)	From	To	Notes
CR 17	Polk City Road	CR 557	US 17/92 in Haines City	former SR 17
CR 17A	Masterpiece Garden Road; Burns Avenue	US 27	SR 17	former SR 17A
CR 17B	Hunt Brothers Road; Buckmore Road	US 27	CR 17A	former SR 17A (south of SR 60) and SR 17B (north of SR 60)
CR 33A	Edgewood Drive	SR 37	US 98	former SR 33A unsigned
CR 35A	West Socrum Loop Road; Dade City Road; Kathleen Road	US 98	I-4 & SR 539	former SR 35A
CR 37A	Cleveland Heights Boulevard; Scott Lake Road			former SR 37A
CR 37B	Lakeland Highlands Road			former SR 37B
CR 54	Ronald Reagan Parkway (formerly Loughman Road)	US 27	US 17/92 at Loughman	former SR 54 unsigned since ca. 2000 when it was renamed for Ronald Reagan
CR 60A	Polk Avenue	SR 60	SR 60	former SR 60A unsigned
CR 64	Main Street	Highlands-Polk County Line	Avon Park Air Force Range	former SR 64
CR 540	Clubhouse Road	CR 37B	US 98	former SR 540
CR 540	Waverly Road; Main Street	US 27 & SR 540	SR 17	former SR 540 unsigned
CR 540A	Central Barn Road	SR 37	US 98	former SR 540A
CR 540A	Eloise Loop Road; Lake Ruby Drive West	CR 655	SR 540	former SR 540A
CR 542	Old Tampa Highway	County Line Road	Wabash Avenue	former SR 542
CR 542	K-Ville Avenue; North Lake Howard Drive; Avenue D Northwest	Gary Road	US 17	former SR 542
CR 542	Lake Hatchineha Road	SR 17	Lake Hatchineha	former SR 542
CR 542A	North Galloway Road	SR 572 & CR 542	CR 35A	former SR 542A
CR 544	Old Lucerne Park Road	SR 544	SR 544	unsigned
CR 544	Lake Marion Road	SR 17 & SR 544	Lake Marion	former SR 544
CR 544A	Derby Avenue	SR 655	SR 544	former SR 544A
CR 546	Saddle Creek Road; Old Dixie Highway	SR 659	CR 655	former SR 546; Continues east of CR 655 as Dixie Highway
CR 546	Kokomo Road	SR 17	CR 544	former SR 546
CR 547	Holly Hill Drive; Lee Jackson Street	US 27	CR 54	former SR 547
CR 550	Overlook Drive	SR 540	SR 542	former SR 542
CR 555	County Road 555; Agricola Road	CR 630	SR 60	former SR 555
CR 555	South Buena Vista Drive; West Echo Street	US 17/92	US 17/92	former SR 555
CR 557	North Buena Vista Drive; Old Grade Road	US 17/92 at Lake Alfred	I-4	former SR 557 and SR 557A
CR 557A		SR 559	CR 557	former SR 557
CR 559		CR 640	CR 655A	former SR 559
CR 559		US 17	CR 655	former SR 559 unsigned
CR 559A	C. Fred Jones Boulevard	CR 655	SR 559	former SR 559
CR 580	East Johnson Avenue; Marion Creek Road; Cypress Parkway	US 17/92 in Haines City	Polk-Osceola County Line at Poinciana	former SR 580
CR 582	Knights Station-Griffin Road; North Florida Avenue; North Socrum Loop Road	Hillsborough-Polk County Line	Pearce Avenue	former SR 582 signed only north of SR 33
CR 630	Brewster-Fort Meade Road	SR 37	US 17 & US 98	former SR 630
CR 630	State Highway 630 West; West H Street; Highway 630 East	US 27 & US 98	SR 60	former SR 630
CR 630A		US 27	CR 630	former SR 630A
CR 630A	Fort Meade Road	CR 630	SR 17	former SR 630A unsigned
CR 640	Pinecrest Road; Homeland-Garfield Road	Hillsborough-Polk County Line	CR 559	former SR 640
CR 640	Alturas-Babson Park Cutoff	US 27	SR 17	former SR 640
CR 653		Old Bartow Lake Wales Road	CR 540A	former SR 653
CR 655	Berkley Road	US 92	SR 33	former SR 655
CR 655	Rifle RangeRoad; Pine Ridge Road; Old 9 Foot Road	SR 60	US 17 & SR 655	former SR 559 and SR 655
CR 655A	Cox Road; Alturas Road	SR 60	SR 60	former SR 655A
CR 657		CR 664 (Hardee County line)	Fort Meade	former SR 657 unsigned
CR 664	Northwest County Line Street	US 17	Bridge over an undetermined creek	former SR 664 unsigned; follows Hardee County line
CR 676	Nichols Road	Hillsborough-Polk County Line	SR 60	former SR 676
