= Florida State Road 659 =

State highway in Florida, United States

State Road 659

Route information
- Maintained by FDOT
- Length: 7.625 mi (12.271 km)

Major junctions
- South end: US 98 at Eaton Park
- US 92 on the Crystal Lake-Combee Settlement line
- North end: SR 33 in Lakeland

Location
- Country: United States
- State: Florida
- Counties: Polk

Highway system
- Florida State Highway System; Interstate; US; State; Former; Pre‑1945; Toll; Scenic
← SR 656	→ SR 663

State Road 659 (SR 659) is a 7.625-mile-long (12.271 km) state highway in Polk County, Florida, that runs from U.S. Route 98 (US 98) and South Combee Road at Eaton Park to SR 33 and Village Lakes Boulevard in far northeast Lakeland via Crystal Lake and Combee Settlement.

== History ==
State Road 659 was originally designated as Florida State Road 33A.

== Major intersections ==
The entire route is in Polk County.

Location	mi	km	Destinations	Notes
Eaton Park	0.000	0.000	US 98 (SR 35 / SR 700) / South Combee Road	Southern terminus; continues as South Combee Road beyond US 98
Crystal Lake	2.484	3.998	CR 542 (East Main Street)	
Crystal Lake–Combee Settlement line	2.732	4.397	US 92 (East Memorial Boulevard / SR 600)	
Combee Settlement	4.432	7.133	CR 546 east (Saddle Creek Road)	
Lakeland	7.625	12.271	SR 33 (Lakeland Hills Boulevard) / Village Lakes Boulevard	Northern terminus; continues as Village Lakes Boulevard beyond SR 33
1.000 mi = 1.609 km; 1.000 km = 0.621 mi
