= U.S. Route 92 =

Highway in the United States

U.S. Highway 92
- US 92 in red, former business route in grey

Route information
- Maintained by FDOT
- Length: 181.363 mi (291.875 km)
- Existed: 1926–present

Major junctions
- West end: US 19 Alt. / SR 687 in St. Petersburg
- I-275 in Tampa; US 41 in Tampa; I-4 near Tampa; US 98 in Lakeland; US 17 from Lake Alfred to DeLand; US 27 in Haines City; US 192 in Kissimmee; US 441 / SR 50 in Orlando; I-95 in Daytona Beach; US 1 in Daytona Beach
- East end: SR A1A in Daytona Beach

Location
- Country: United States
- State: Florida
- Counties: Pinellas, Hillsborough, Polk, Osceola, Orange, Seminole, Volusia

Highway system
- United States Numbered Highway System; List; Special; Divided; Florida State Highway System; Interstate; US; State; Former; Pre‑1945; Toll; Scenic
| ← US 91 | US | → US 93 |
| ← SR 91 | FL | → SR 93 |
| ← SR 516 | SR 517 | → SR 518 |
| ← SR 599 | SR 600 | → SR 606 |

U.S. Highway 92 (US 92) is a 181-mile (291 km) U.S. Route entirely in the state of Florida. The western terminus is at US 19 Alternate (US 19 Alt.) and State Road 687 (SR 687)) in downtown St. Petersburg. The eastern terminus is at SR A1A in Daytona Beach. Originally the main thoroughfare connecting the major cities of Central Florida, this has since been superseded by Interstate 4 (I-4), which runs almost entirely the same route. For about half of its length, US 92 runs concurrently with US 17.

Like all highways designated by the American Association of State Highway and Transportation Officials (AASHTO) in Florida, US 92 always carries a hidden state road number from the Florida Department of Transportation (FDOT):

- State Road 687 from the US route's western terminus at US 19 Alt./SR 595 to the junction with SR 686/SR 687/SR 694 in St. Petersburg;
- State Road 600 from the junction with SR 686/SR 687/SR 694 in St. Petersburg to George Jenkins Boulevard in Lakeland, and again from East Gary Road in Lakeland to the route's eastern terminus at SR A1A in Daytona Beach;
- State Road 517 (formerly SR 600B) from George Jenkins Boulevard (SR 600 east) to Memorial Boulevard (SR 546 west) in Lakeland; and
- State Road 546 from Memorial Boulevard to East Gary Road (SR 600 west) in Lakeland.

== Route description ==
US 92 runs concurrently with SR 687 from downtown St. Petersburg to SR 600, SR 686 and SR 694 at the west end of the Gandy Bridge; unsigned SR 600 from the west end of the Gandy Bridge to west of downtown Lakeland; unsigned SR 517 west of downtown Lakeland; SR 546 from west of downtown Lakeland to east of downtown Lakeland; and unsigned SR 600 from east of downtown Lakeland to Daytona Beach.

=== Tampa Bay Area ===
US 92 begins going eastbound along SR 687 at the intersection of SR 595 in St. Petersburg. The road continues north along SR 687 until it reaches the eastern termini of SR 686 and SR 694, where it turns right on Gandy Boulevard (SR 600) before crossing the Gandy Bridge into Tampa. After crossing the Gandy Bridge, US 92 intersects West Shore Boulevard and runs east along Gandy Boulevard until it reaches Dale Mabry Highway at the first interchange with the Lee Roy Selmon Expressway where it turns north. SR 685 branches to the northeast at Henderson Boulevard. The next major intersections are Kennedy Boulevard (SR 60), then I-275 at exit 41A. In between SR 616 and SR 574, US 92 passes George M. Steinbrenner Field and Raymond James Stadium. A parclo interchange with Hillsborough Avenue takes US 92 from Dale Mabry to Hillsborough Avenue and SR 580 from Hillsborough Avenue to Dale Mabry Highway. US 92 crosses two parallel bridges over the Hillsborough River, which consist of a 1939-built eastbound vertical lift bridge, and a 1960-built westbound bascule bridge. Later the road intersects with US 41 Business (US 41 Bus.), I-275 again at exit 47A-B, then intersects northbound US 41 and SR 45, where US 41 and US 92 overlap each other. One other major intersection exists with SR 585 before US 41 turns southbound as the concurrency ends.

After SR 583, the road becomes part of the collective-distributor roads along I-4 west and east of the parclo interchange with US 301 at exit 7. The eastern end of the interchange contains a stub for a proposed west-to-northbound ramp to US 301 at the westbound flyover. Eventually, US 92 crosses under I-75 but does not intersect it directly (access to I-75 is only available eastbound from I-4). Three other local roads that cross US 92 access I-4. These consist of Mango Road in Mango, followed by McIntosh Road and Branch Forbes Road in Dover. Within Plant City US 92 approaches the southern terminus of SR 566 (Thonotosassa Road) then splits into a one-way pair. The first major intersection along this one-way pair is SR 39 (Alexander Road), followed by SR 574, but only along the eastbound lanes. In downtown Plant City, US 92 encounters SR 39A, with which it has a two-block overlap between Wheeler and Collins Streets. After the one-way pair ends, the last state highway to intersect the route in the city and Hillsborough County is the southern terminus of SR 533 (Park Road). East of SR 533, the road encounters a random series of level crossings for freight spurs leading from the CSX Lakeland Subdivision.

=== Polk County vicinity ===
As the road crosses the Hillsborough-Polk county line from Youmans, it passes a historic stone marker on the southwest corner of County Line Road. It also passes by a former truck weigh station, and then runs beneath SR 570 (Polk Parkway) with no direct access. After the intersection with SR 572, it passes by the Silver Moon Drive-In in the former unincorporated community of Winston. Entering the city of Lakeland, US 92 approaches the intersection with Wabash Avenue (hidden SR 517) and makes a brief turn to the north, while SR 600 continues eastbound unmarked along George Jenkins Boulevard (former US 92 Bus.). The route turns east again at the intersection with SR 546, and overlaps that route through the rest of the city. US 92/SR 546 continues eastbound along Memorial Boulevard where it climbs a bridge over the CSX Vitis Subdivision and SR 539 with no access. Roughly 16 blocks later, the two routes approach US 98, and is joined by hidden SR 700. Three blocks later, it intersects the southern terminus of SR 33. SR 700 leaves the route at North Lake Parker Avenue, while US 92/SR 546 rides along the southern bank of Lake Parker, until the intersection of East Gary Road, where SR 546 comes to an end and hidden SR 600 rejoins the route.

On the border between Crystal Lake and Combee Settlement, US 92/SR 600 encounters the intersection with SR 659. Later it enters more rural surroundings as it enters Fussels Corner and briefly runs directly along the north side of the CSX Carters Subdivision, then moves away from the tracks as it enters Auburndale, where the route encounters the Polk Parkway again, but this time at an interchange. Serving as a commercial strip beyond this point, the route encounters the southern terminus of County Road 655 (CR 655), and three blocks later the northern terminus of SR 655. The road curves northeast where it barely runs along the southeast coast of Lake Lena, then curves to the southeast at Bridgers Avenue, a former alignment of US 92. From there it runs along a bridge that passes over a railroad junction between the CSX Auburndale Subdivision, Carters Subdivision and a freight spur leading between the northeast coast of Lake Lena, and southwest coast of Lake Ariana. As the route descends from the bridge, the street name changes to Magnolia Avenue and five blocks later, encounters the intersection of SR 559 (Main Street). Across from the south side of Auburndale Cemetery the western terminus of SR 544 branches off to the southeast towards Legoland (formerly Cypress Gardens) and part of Haines City. In the meantime, US 92 curves back to the northeast where it briefly enters a northwestern portion of Winter Haven, encounters the eastern end of Bridgers Avenue, and serves as the location for Winter Haven Regional Airport (a.k.a. Gilbert's Field).

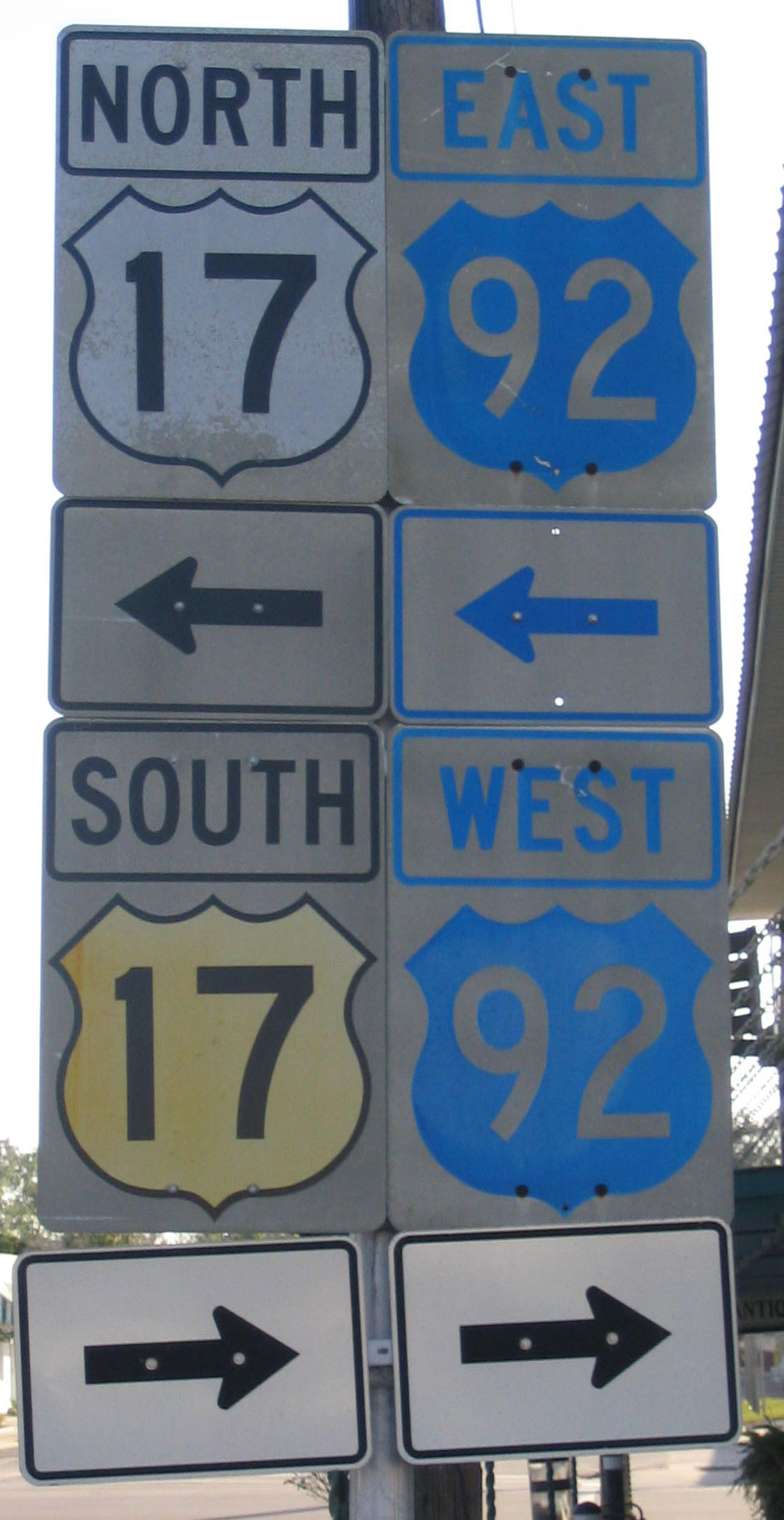
Older US 17/US 92 shields in Lake Alfred

US 92 and US 17 join at the southern end of Lake Alfred. SR 600 continues to carry US 92 from Auburndale, while SR 555 takes US 17 from the south via Winter Haven. CR 555 soon splits to the north along the old road through Lake Alfred, while US 17/US 92 runs to the northeast on Lake Shore Way. The routes become a one-way pair between Echo Street and Seminole Way, but before that pair ends, CR 557 begins at Polemo Street, where it heads west for a block to CR 555, and then turns north towards I-4; just past CR 557, US 17/US 92 turns east towards Haines City. It enters downtown Haines City on Hinson Avenue after crossing under US 27 at a cloverleaf, meeting the northern end of SR 17 (formerly US 27 Alt.) before turning north on 17th Street. It soon meets CR 580, which runs east to Poinciana. In Davenport, US 92 meets CR 547, which heads west to US 27 and north along old US 17/US 92. US 92 then intersects with Ronald Reagan Parkway (CR 54) at Loughman.

=== Orlando area ===
Entering Osceola County, US 92 picks up the Orange Blossom Trail name. Orange Blossom Trail (OBT) takes US 92 east and north through Kissimmee and into Orlando. The OBT name temporarily ends at Pleasant Hill Road (former SR 531) in southern Kissimmee, where US 92 uses John Young Parkway (formerly Bermuda Avenue) to Vine Street (US 192/SR 530). It turns east there on US 192, turning north at Main Street, which becomes OBT at the north city limits. US 441 (along with SR 500) joins US 92 at US 192—thus OBT carries US 17, US 92 and US 441, as well as unsigned SR 500 and SR 600, from Kissimmee to Orlando. Along this stretch, the road intersects the Osceola Parkway in Kissimmee, SR 417 (Central Florida GreeneWay) at exit 11, and the Central Florida Parkway as it passes east of the resort area of Orlando that includes Walt Disney World and affiliated resorts, Sea World, and Universal Studios. OBT then comes to a massive combined interchange with Florida's Turnpike and SR 528 (Beachline Expressway) in Sky Lake. North of this interchange, the road passes west of The Florida Mall and intersects SR 482.

The road reaches an interchange with I-4 in Holden Heights. OBT continues into Orlando and comes to a diamond interchange with SR 408 (East–West Expressway) at exit 9. Orange Blossom Trail bypasses downtown Orlando to the west, meeting SR 50 (Colonial Drive) northwest of downtown. At SR 50, US 17/US 92 turns east, while US 441 continues northwest on OBT towards Apopka. US 17, concurrent with SR 50 (and SR 600), meets the south end of Edgewater Drive and crosses I-4 and SR 527 (Orange Avenue and Magnolia Avenue) before meeting Mills Avenue (SR 15), where US 17/US 92 turns north.

Mills Avenue carries SR 15 on both sides of SR 50, but is only signed as such to the south, as north of SR 50, it carries US 92 (and unsigned SR 600). It crosses Lake Estelle on the Andrews Causeway before reaching the border between Orlando and Winter Park.

In Winter Park, US 92's name changes to Orlando Avenue. It crosses SR 527 (Orange Avenue) and SR 426 (Fairbanks Avenue) and meets the east end of SR 423 (Lee Road) while bypassing downtown Winter Park to the west. Shortly after crossing into Maitland, it passes under the SunRail tracks (formerly CSX Transportation's "A" Line), and the old road through downtown Winter Park — Park Avenue — merges in from the southeast. US 92 meets the east end of CR 438A (Lake Avenue), which heads west to Eatonville, and then splits from the old alignment (CR 427) near downtown Maitland. It crosses Horatio Avenue (former County Road 436A) and meets the east end of SR 414 (Maitland Boulevard) before crossing into Seminole County.

In Seminole County, US 92 is a main commercial strip as it heads through Casselberry (where it crosses SR 436 Semoran Boulevard at an interchange) and Longwood (where it crosses SR 434). North of Longwood it meets the north end of SR 419 and crosses CR 427 (the old alignment). Lake Mary Boulevard, Airport Boulevard and SR 417 cross US 92 in southern Sanford, and it meets the west end of CR 427A. At 25th Street, southwest of downtown Sanford, SR 46 comes in from the east and turns north to run concurrently near downtown; CR 46A heads west on 25th Street. 13th Street marks the west end of CR 415, and at 1st Street the triple concurrency turns west. Before leaving the Sanford city limits, the routes run over a bridge for a railroad line near the Sanford Amtrak Auto Train station, as well as the nearby SunRail station. The routes leave the concurrency with SR 46 at the north end of CR 15 (once a branch of SR 15), and then runs north towards the interchange with I-4 where US 17/US 92 turns west along the south shore of Lake Monroe (part of the St. Johns River). Just before crossing the river into Volusia County at the west end of the lake, which runs unsigned with SR 15 and SR 600 here) and crosses under at the end of its own bridge across the river (the St. Johns River Veterans Memorial Bridge).

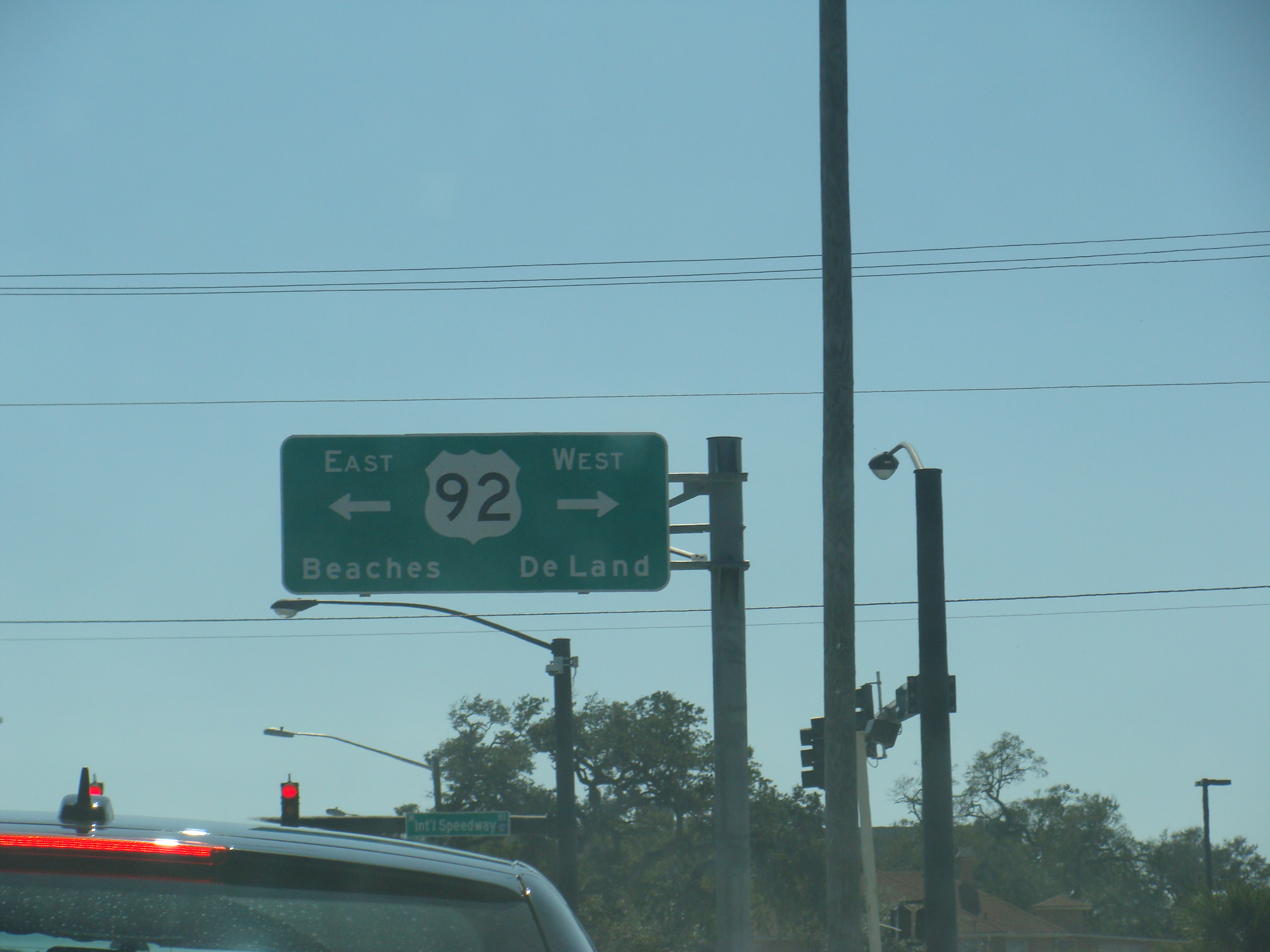
A sign for US 92 on Ridgewood Avenue in Daytona Beach

=== DeBary to Daytona Beach ===
After crossing the St. Johns River via the C.A. "Bill" Benedict Bridge, US 92 continues north into Volusia County, meeting the west ends of CR 4162 (in DeBary), CR 4146, and CR 4145 (in Orange City). North of Orange City is a trumpet interchange with SR 472, a four-lane connection to I-4. US 92 then crosses CR 4116 and meets the south end of SR 15A, a western bypass of DeLand. US 92 passes through downtown DeLand on Woodland Boulevard, crossing SR 44 at New York Avenue. The intersection of US 92 and SR 44 does not allow any turns—right or left—and so adjacent city streets are marked for those turns. In northern DeLand, US 92 splits to the east on International Speedway Boulevard, while US 17 continues north. To the west of the split, International Speedway Boulevard is CR 92, a short connection to SR 15A that allows traffic on US 92 to bypass downtown DeLand. SR 15A itself rejoins US 17 north of DeLand.

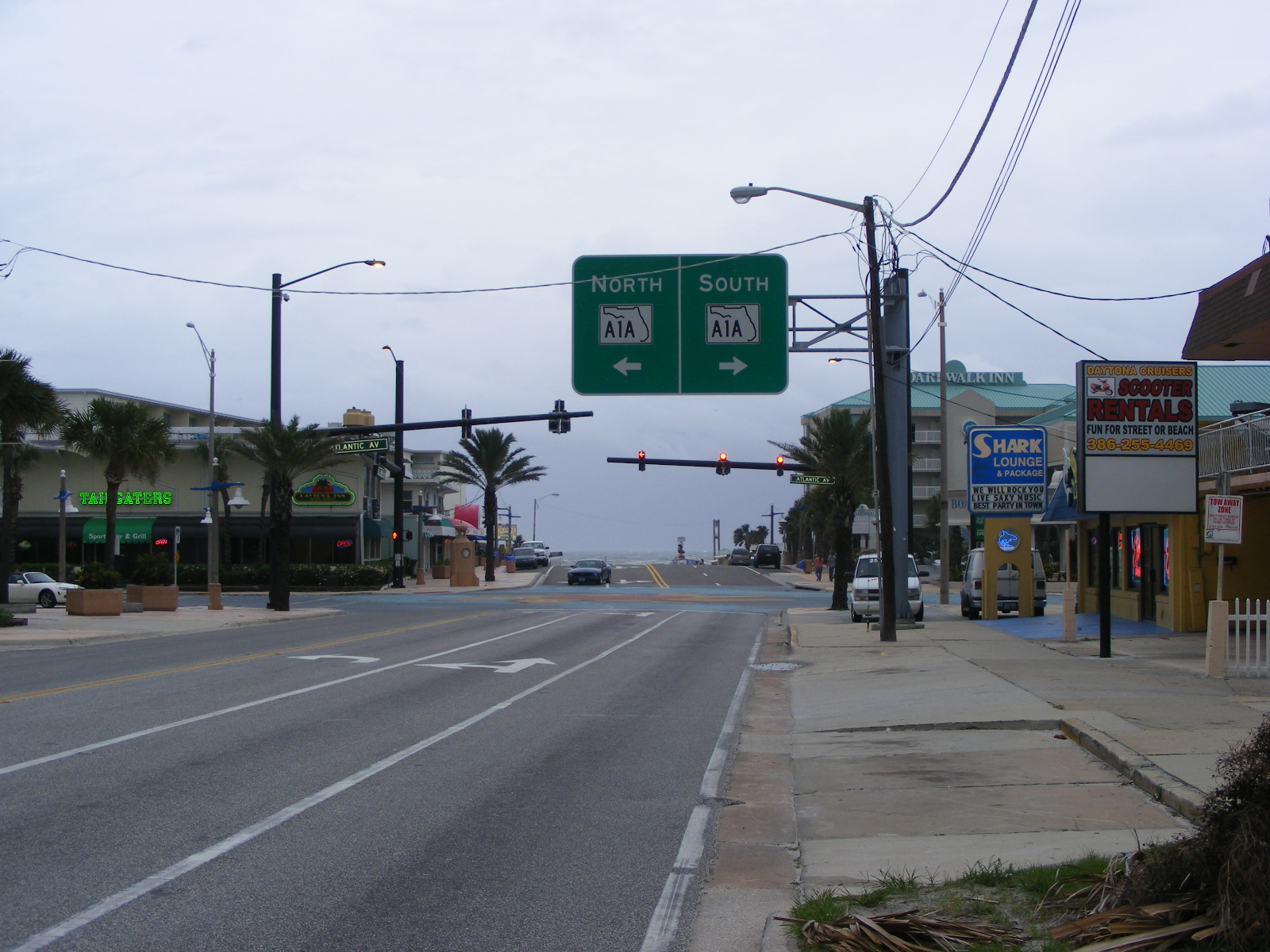
Eastern terminus of US 92 at SR A1A in Daytona Beach

From DeLand to its terminus in Daytona Beach, US 92 carries the local name, International Speedway Boulevard, running through Tiger Bay State Forest then passing a connecting road towards I-4 with a westbound only flyover off-ramp and an eastbound only on-ramp from exit 129. The highway serves as the southern terminus of LPGA Boulevard then has an interchange with I-95 before it passes by the Daytona International Speedway. US 92 passes by other landmarks such as Daytona Beach International Airport and Volusia Mall. US 92 spans the Halifax River and Intracoastal Waterway via the Broadway Bridge before reaching its eastern terminus at SR A1A.

== History ==
Historical US 92 route markers

1927 design

1948 design

1956–1993, blue highway shields

US 92 was in the original 1926 plan, connecting Tampa (concurrent with US 41) to US 1 in Daytona Beach. It had been the Dixie Highway Tampa-St. Petersburg Loop from Plant City to Haines City, the West Mainline from Haines City to Orlando, and the East Florida Connector from Orlando to DeLand.

US 92 was signed along the following roads in 1927:

- SR 17 from Tampa to Haines City;
- SR 2 from Haines City to Orlando;
- SR 3 from Orlando to DeLand; and
- SR 21 from DeLand to Daytona Beach.

When the bypass of downtown Tampa on SR 17 (Hillsborough Avenue) opened in the early 1930s, US 92 and US 41 were rerouted to use it. US 92 turned south from the new road where US 41 turned north, at Nebraska Avenue (former SR 5, probably then a spur of SR 5), and continued to end in downtown Tampa.

A 1942 map shows US 92 extended west along SR 17 and SR 229 to end at US 19 in Dunedin; it was soon truncated back to Tampa.

In the 1945 renumbering, the whole route of US 92 was numbered SR 600, except for the section south to downtown Tampa, which was SR 45. It was extended west and south to downtown St. Petersburg along SR 600 and SR 687 in 1953.

In 1947, the route was extended east in Daytona Beach across the Intracoastal Waterway and the Halifax River after the Broadway Bridge was reconstructed and opened.

In 1961, US 92 was moved to bypass downtown Lakeland, along SR 517 and SR 546. The old route was signed as US 92 Bus. until 1998.

Until 1999, US 92 ran through downtown Kissimmee on Emmett Street, Broadway and Main Street, along with US 17.

In 2006, US 92 (along with US 17) was re-signed to bypass downtown Kissimmee, moving it to US 192 from John Young Parkway to US 441.

In late 2013, FDOT began an $80 million project to construct a flyover interchange with US 17/US 92 traveling over SR 436 in Casselberry. This interchange was built to alleviate congestion at one of the busiest intersections in Florida. The flyover interchange was completed on April 6, 2015, with a ribbon-cutting ceremony held.

== Major intersections ==
| County | Location | mi | km | Destinations | Notes |
|---|---|---|---|---|---|
| Pinellas | St. Petersburg | 0.000 | 0.000 | US 19 Alt. north / SR 595 north (5th Avenue North) / SR 687 south (4th Street North) | West end of SR 687 concurrency |
| Pinellas | St. Petersburg | 0.996 | 1.603 | To I-275 / 22nd Avenue North (CR 690) | |
| Pinellas | St. Petersburg | 2.008 | 3.232 | To I-275 / 38th Avenue North (CR 184) | |
| Pinellas | St. Petersburg | 3.002 | 4.831 | To I-275 / 54th Avenue North (CR 202) | |
| Pinellas | St. Petersburg | 3.508 | 5.646 | 62nd Avenue North (CR 216) | |
| Pinellas | St. Petersburg | 4.821 | 7.759 | 83rd Avenue North (CR 823) | |
| Pinellas | St. Petersburg | 5.998 | 9.653 | SR 686 west (Roosevelt Boulevard) / SR 687 north (4th Street North) / SR 694 west (Gandy Boulevard) to I-275 – Pinellas Park | Eastern end of SR 687 concurrency; western end of SR 600 concurrency |
| Pinellas | St. Petersburg | 6.948 | 11.182 | San Martin Boulevard (CR 823 south) - Weedon Island Preserve Cultural and Natural History Center | |
| Old Tampa Bay | | 10.7 | 17.2 | Gandy Bridge | |
| Hillsborough | Tampa | 13.033 | 20.975 | CR 587 north (West Shore Boulevard) | |
| Hillsborough | Tampa | 14.191 | 22.838 | SR 618 east (Selmon Expressway) to I-75 – Brandon, Downtown Tampa | SR 618 exit 1; no access from US 92 west to SR 618 east |
| Hillsborough | Tampa | 14.285 | 22.989 | SR 573 south (Dale Mabry Highway) – MacDill AFB | |
| Hillsborough | Tampa | 17.052 | 27.443 | SR 685 north (Henderson Boulevard) | No left turn westbound |
| Hillsborough | Tampa | 17.806 | 28.656 | SR 60 (West Kennedy Boulevard) – Tampa, Clearwater | |
| Hillsborough | Tampa | 18.50 | 29.77 | I-275 (SR 93) to I-4 – Ocala, Orlando, St. Petersburg | I-275 exit 41 |
| Hillsborough | Tampa | 19.318 | 31.089 | SR 616 west (West Columbus Drive) – Tampa International Airport, Clearwater | |
| Hillsborough | Tampa | 20.335 | 32.726 | SR 574 east (West Dr. Martin Luther King Jr. Boulevard) | |
| Hillsborough | Tampa | 21.31 | 34.30 | SR 580 (Hillsborough Avenue / Dale Mabry Highway) to SR 589 – Land o' Lakes, Oldsmar | Interchange |
| Hillsborough | Tampa | 23.696 | 38.135 | Hillsborough Avenue Bridge over Hillsborough River | |
| Hillsborough | Tampa | 24.077 | 38.748 | US 41 Bus. (North Florida Avenue / SR 685) | |
| Hillsborough | Tampa | 24.43 | 39.32 | I-275 (SR 93) to I-4 – St. Petersburg, Ocala | I-275 exit 47 |
| Hillsborough | Tampa | 24.582 | 39.561 | US 41 north / SR 45 south (Nebraska Avenue) – Lutz | Western end of US 41 concurrency |
| Hillsborough | Tampa | 25.584 | 41.173 | SR 585 south (North 22nd Street) – Ybor City Historic District | |
| Hillsborough | Tampa | 26.849 | 43.209 | US 41 south (40th Street / SR 599) – Gibsonton | Eastern end of US 41 concurrency |
| Hillsborough | | 28.104 | 45.229 | SR 583 (56th Street) – Temple Terrace, Busch Gardens, Gibsonton | |
| Hillsborough | | 30.32 | 48.80 | I-4 (SR 400) / US 301 (SR 41 north / SR 43 south) to I-75 – Riverview, Zephyrhills, Orlando, Tampa, State Fairgrounds, Tampa Executive Airport | I-4 exit 7 |
| Hillsborough | Kennedy Hill | 33.759 | 54.330 | CR 579 to I-4 – Thonotosassa, Mango | |
| Hillsborough | | 37.438 | 60.251 | To I-4 / McIntosh Road | |
| Hillsborough | | 41.019 | 66.014 | To I-4 / Branch Forbes Road / North Forbes Road | |
| Hillsborough | | 41.746 | 67.184 | Turkey Creek Road (CR 574B south) - Airport | |
| Hillsborough | Plant City | 43.657 | 70.259 | SR 566 west (Thonotosassa Road) to I-4 | |
| Hillsborough | Plant City | 44.071 | 70.925 | SR 39 (Alexander Street) to I-4 | |
| Hillsborough | Plant City | 44.242 | 71.201 | Reynolds Street (SR 574 west) | Eastbound access only |
| Hillsborough | Plant City | 44.882 | 72.231 | SR 39A north / I-4 (Wheeler Street) – Zephyrhills | Western end of SR 39A concurrency; former SR 39 Truck Route southbound |
| Hillsborough | Plant City | 44.984 | 72.395 | SR 39A south (Collins Street) – Historic District | Eastern end of SR 39A concurrency |
| Hillsborough | Plant City | 46.134 | 74.245 | SR 553 north (Park Road / CR 574A south) to I-4 / SR 39 | |
| Hillsborough–Polk county line | Plant City–Lakeland line | 49.204 | 79.186 | To I-4 / SR 570 (Polk Parkway) / County Line Road | |
| Polk | Lakeland | 50.239 | 80.852 | To SR 570 east / Clark Road | |
| Polk | Lakeland | 51.494 | 82.872 | SR 572 east (Airport Road) / CR 542A north (Galloway Road) to SR 570 (Polk Parkway) – Airport | |
| Polk | Lakeland | 53.335 | 85.834 | George Jenkins Boulevard (SR 600 east) | Eastern end of SR 600 overlap; western end of SR 517 concurrency |
| Polk | | 54.247 | 87.302 | SR 546 west (Memorial Boulevard) to I-4 | Eastern end of SR 517 concurrency; western end of SR 546 concurrency |
| Polk | Lakeland | 55.754 | 89.727 | Lincoln Avenue | to SR 539 |
| Polk | Lakeland | 56.010 | 90.139 | SR 563 south (Martin L. King Jr. Avenue) to SR 570 (Polk Parkway) | |
| Polk | Lakeland | 56.255 | 90.534 | US 98 (Florida Avenue / SR 35 / SR 700 north) to SR 37 / I-4 east | Western end of SR 700 concurrency |
| Polk | Lakeland | 56.444 | 90.838 | SR 33 north (Lakeland Hills Boulevard) – Marchant Stadium, Polk City | Massachusetts Avenue continues south from SR 33 |
| Polk | Lakeland | 57.259 | 92.149 | To SR 570 (Polk Parkway) / Lake Parker Avenue (SR 700 south) – Bartow | Eastern end of SR 700 overlap; former US 98 south |
| Polk | Lakeland | 58.298 | 93.822 | East Gary Road (SR 600 west) | Eastern end of SR 546 concurrency; western end of SR 600 concurrency |
| Polk | Crystal Lake–Combee Settlement line | 59.344 | 95.505 | SR 659 (Combee Road) to I-4 | |
| Polk | Auburndale | 63.893 | 102.826 | SR 570 (Polk Parkway) – Orlando, Tampa | SR 570 exit 17 |
| Polk | Auburndale | 64.953 | 104.532 | CR 655 north (Berkley Road) | |
| Polk | Auburndale | 65.214 | 104.952 | SR 655 south (Recker Highway) | |
| Polk | Auburndale | 66.799 | 107.503 | SR 559 (Main Street) to I-4 – Polk City, Downtown Auburndale | |
| Polk | Auburndale | 67.158 | 108.080 | SR 544 east (Havendale Boulevard) – Winter Haven, Legoland | |
| Polk | Lake Alfred | 70.488 | 113.439 | US 17 south (SR 555) – Winter Haven, Bartow | Western end of US 17 overlap |
see US 17 (mile 88.772-177.533) and US 441 (mile 229.899-247.086)
| Volusia | DeLand | 159.249 | 256.286 | US 17 north (Woodland Boulevard / SR 15) / CR 92 west (International Speedway Boulevard) to SR 11 – DeLeon Springs, truck bypass to US 17 south / US 92 west / SR 44 west / SR 15A | Eastern end of US 17/SR 15 concurrency |
| Volusia | DeLand | 161.882 | 260.524 | CR 4101 south (Kepler Road) | |
| Volusia | Daytona Beach | 172.6 | 277.8 | I-4 west (SR 400) – Orlando | westbound exit and eastbound entrance; I-4 exit 129 |
| Volusia | Daytona Beach | 173.242 | 278.806 | LPGA Boulevard (CR 4019 north) - Holly Hill, Daytona Beach Municipal Stadium | |
| Volusia | Daytona Beach | 174.831 | 281.363 | CR 415 south (Tomoka Farms Road) | |
| Volusia | Daytona Beach | 175.18 | 281.92 | I-95 (SR 9) – Miami, Jacksonville | I-95 exit 260C |
| Volusia | Daytona Beach | 175.962 | 283.183 | CR 4009 (Williamson Boulevard) – Daytona Beach Kennel Club | |
| Volusia | Daytona Beach | 177.337 | 285.396 | Midway Avenue - International Airport | |
| Volusia | Daytona Beach | 177.933 | 286.355 | SR 483 (Clyde Morris Boulevard) – Embry-Riddle University | |
| Volusia | Daytona Beach | 178.864 | 287.854 | SR 5A (Nova Road) – Museum of Arts and Sciences | |
| Volusia | Daytona Beach | 180.015 | 289.706 | US 1 (Ridgewood Avenue / SR 5) – Holly Hill, South Daytona | |
| Volusia | Daytona Beach | 180.56 | 290.58 | Broadway Bridge over Halifax River (Intracoastal Waterway) | |
| Volusia | Daytona Beach | 181.070 | 291.404 | SR 441 south (Peninsula Drive) | |
| Volusia | Daytona Beach | 181.363 | 291.875 | SR A1A (Atlantic Avenue) | |
1.000 mi = 1.609 km; 1.000 km = 0.621 mi: Concurrency terminus; Incomplete access

== Special routes ==
=== Kissimmee truck route ===
U.S. Highway 92 Truck
- Location: Kissimmee, Florida

US Highway 17/US Highway 92 Truck (US 17/US 92 Truck) is an alternate route for US 17/US 92 in northern Kissimmee, following John Young Parkway and the Osceola Parkway (CR 522) instead of Vine Street (US 192) and Orange Blossom Trail. It was signed in about 2011 when the single-point urban interchange at John Young and Osceola Parkways was completed.

=== Maitland truck route ===
U.S. Highway 92 Truck
- Location: Winter Park–Maitland, Florida

US Highway 17/US Highway 92 Truck (US 17/US 92 Truck) is designated to divert overheight truck traffic away from a low railroad bridge that carries the SunRail rail line over US 17-92 in southern Maitland.

=== Lakeland business route ===
U.S. Highway 92 Business
- Location: Lakeland, Florida
- Existed: 1961–1999

U.S. Route 92 Business (US 92 Bus.) in Lakeland was a 4.2 miles (6.8 km) business route designed to keep trucks from entering Downtown Lakeland that followed SR 600 between 1961 and 1998. The route began where US 92 turned north onto SR 517. It runs along George Jenkins Boulevard, then makes a sharp southeast turn along Sloan Avenue, while George Jenkins Boulevard becomes SR 548. Sloan Avenue becomes a divided highway between the 12-foot-6-inch (3.81 m) bridge beneath the CSX Lakeland Subdivision, only to emerge at the intersection of West Main Street where it turns east. The road's major intersections include a partial interchange with SR 563, and then SR 37, where West Main Street becomes East Main Street. The road makes a brief left turn onto Massachusetts Avenue in front of Lake Mirror for one block, then turns right at the end of Cedar Street where it runs along the north shore of Lake Mirror passing by Lakeland Amtrak Station. East Main makes a sharp right turn to the south before the intersection of Rose Street, then turns east again at the intersection of East Lake Street. From there it has an intersection with US 98 (SR 548), and after Lake Parker Avenue makes a north turn onto Tyler Road. The road crosses under the CSX Carters Subdivision, this time beneath a 13-foot-6-inch (4.11 m) two-lane undivided bridge, and then curves onto East Gary Road, where it runs east until finally ending at US 92 along the south shore of Lake Parker. FDOT maps still show US 92 Bus. as an existing route.
