= Florida State Road 559 =

Highway in Florida

State Road 559

Route information
- Maintained by FDOT
- Length: 10.921 mi (17.576 km)

Major junctions
- South end: SR 655 in Auburndale
- US 92 in Auburndale; I-4 in Auburndale
- North end: SR 33 in Polk City

Location
- Country: United States
- State: Florida
- Counties: Polk

Highway system
- Florida State Highway System; Interstate; US; State; Former; Pre‑1945; Toll; Scenic
← SR 555	→ SR 563

State Road 559 (SR 559) is an 11-mile-long (18 km) state highway located entirely in Polk County, Florida. It is accessible to Auburndale and Polk City. It straddles the shoreline of Lake Ariana and Lake Juliana.

== Route description ==
SR 559 starts at Florida State Road 655 in Auburndale as Main Street at a grade-separated junction that crosses over both SR 655 and the CSX Auburndale Subdivision. The first major intersection is with U.S. Highway 92 (US 92). It heads northward through the downtown of the city, making three sharp turns around the Auburndale Chamber of Commerce and proceeding into a traffic circle around Lake Stella. The road makes its way to the eastern shore of Lake Ariana and straddles it for one mile (1.6 km) before passing the subdivision of Ariana Harbors. Leaving Auburndale, the road runs along the northeastern shore of Lake Juliana and continues north and slightly west to intersect with Interstate 4 (I-4) at its exit 44. The road passes through the site of the formerly proposed community of Orlampa then makes a sharp left turn at Polk County Road 557A. From there it passes by the Fantasy of Flight, turns northwest, and ends at SR 33 in Polk City.

== Major intersections ==
The entire route is in Polk County.

Location	mi	km	Destinations	Notes
Auburndale	0.000	0.000	SR 655 (Recker Highway)	
Auburndale	0.683	1.099	Derby Avenue (CR 544A)	
Auburndale	0.941	1.514	US 92 (Magnolia Avenue / SR 600) – Lake Alfred, Lakeland	
Auburndale	7.649	12.310	CR 559A west (C. Fred Jones Boulevard)	
Auburndale	8.469	13.630	I-4 (SR 400) – Tampa, Orlando	I-4 exit 44
Auburndale	9.090	14.629	CR 557A east – Lake Alfred, Polk Correctional Institution	
Polk City	10.921	17.576	SR 33 – Lakeland, Groveland	
1.000 mi = 1.609 km; 1.000 km = 0.621 mi

== Related routes ==
=== Auburndale truck route ===
State Road 559 Truck
- Location: Auburndale

State Road 559 Truck is a truck detour mainly along Berkeley Road. It begins at the southern terminus of the northern segment of Polk County Road 655 at US 92, running in a 6.6-mile (10.6 km) overlap with the county route. At the intersection of CR 559A (C. Fred Jones Boulevard), SR 559 Truck turns east, and runs along almost the entire county road until it reaches SR 559 south of exit 44 on Interstate 4.
