= Florida State Road 563 =

State highway in Florida, United States

State Road 563

Route information
- Maintained by FDOT
- Length: 4.912 mi (7.905 km)

Major junctions
- South end: Harden Boulevard in Lakeland
- SR 570 in Lakeland
- North end: US 92 / Martin Luther King Jr. Avenue in Lakeland

Location
- Country: United States
- State: Florida
- Counties: Polk

Highway system
- Florida State Highway System; Interstate; US; State; Former; Pre‑1945; Toll; Scenic
← SR 559	→ SR 566

State Road 563 (SR 563) is a 4.912-mile-long (7.905 km) state highway in Lakeland, Polk County, Florida, that runs from 0.162 miles (0.261 km) south of Beaker Road to U.S. Route 92 and Martin Luther King Jr. Avenue.

== History ==
The original version of Florida State Road 563 was a secondary route that ran north of US 92 along Dakota Avenue until Parkview Street, where it ran east to US 98. The segment between Lake Wire and what is today hidden Florida State Road 600 was part of former State Road 35A.

The road was extended southbound along a new arterial in 1975 towards the Lakeland Civic Center, and vicinity. The project included taking over Florida State Road 539 (former SR 35A) south of Lake Wire, underpasses beneath the east leg of the wye for the CSX Carters and Vitis Subdivisions, West Main Street, West Lemon Street (both former US BUS 92/SR 600) and West Orange Street, as well as a southbound off-ramp leading to Lemon and Main Streets and a northbound on-ramp from Orange Street. The route then made a westbound turn at the corner of the Civic Center, leading to Lake Beulah via West Lime Avenue. However that terminus was scrapped for an extended route named Harden Boulevard, which ran along the north and west sides of Lake Hunter through a former strip mine, part of which became the Kings Point Par 3 Golf Course and finally terminating at Florida State Road 572 (Drane Field Road). By 1998 the original southern terminus had been replaced by an interchange with Polk Parkway at Exit 5. Harden Boulevard extends south in a two-lane undivided highway with the right-of-way for two more lanes leading to West Pipkin Road. This was to be part of another extension proposed to terminate the road at Florida State Road 37 south of Fitzgerald Road in 1979.

Dakota Avenue was renamed Martin Luther King Jr. Avenue sometime during the 21st Century. The segment between Ariana Street and Kathleen Road was named Sikes Boulevard. Parkview Street was renamed West 10th Street west of US 92 and Parkview Place east of US 92. The original version was decommissioned and redesignated as an unmarked Polk County Road extension on July 19, 2005. Construction of the western segment of Florida State Road 548 in the late-2000s, brought about a redesign of the intersection with the southern terminus of SR 539.

== Major intersections ==
The entire route is in Lakeland, Polk County.

mi	km	Destinations	Notes
0.000	0.000	End of state maintenance	Southern terminus; continues as Harden Boulevard
0.360– 0.427	0.579– 0.687	SR 570 (Polk Parkway) – Orlando, Tampa	SR 570 exit 5
		West Lemon Street / West Main Street (hidden SR 600)	Southbound exit, northbound entrance
4.330	6.968	SR 539 north (Kathleen Road) to I-4	Southern terminus of SR 539
4.549	7.321	SR 548 (George Jenkins Boulevard / Oak Street West)	
4.912	7.905	US 92 (West Memorial Boulevard / SR 546) / Martin Luther King Jr. Avenue	Northern terminus; continues as Martin Luther King Jr. Boulevard beyond US 92
1.000 mi = 1.609 km; 1.000 km = 0.621 mi: Incomplete access
