= Florida State Road 700 =

State highway in Florida, United States

State Road 700
- SR 700 in red, CR 700 in blue

Route information
- Maintained by FDOT
- Length: 225.081 mi (362.233 km)

Major junctions
- North end: US 19 / US 98 near Homosassa Springs
- US 98 / US 441 in Canal Point
- East end: US 98 / US 441 / SR 80 near Twenty Mile Bend

Location
- Country: United States
- State: Florida

Highway system
- Florida State Highway System; Interstate; US; State; Former; Pre‑1945; Toll; Scenic
← SR 699	→ SR 704

State Road 700 (SR 700) is the mostly unsigned Florida Department of Transportation state road designation of U.S. Route 98 (US 98) between Chassahowitzka (where US 98 continues northward as unsigned SR 55) and Twentymile Bend (where US 98 continues eastward as signed SR 80). The only segments of State Road 700 that are signed are between SR 50A and US 41 in Brooksville, and from Okeechobee south, through Canal Point, to SR 80. From the northernmost signed point, it's an unsigned concurrency with SR 45(US 41), then with SR 50, before rejoining US 98 at the west end of the US 98/SR 50 concurrency. The section between Canal Point to SR 80 is signed only as State Road 700 since the relocating of US 98 to run concurrent with US 441 in Palm Beach County.

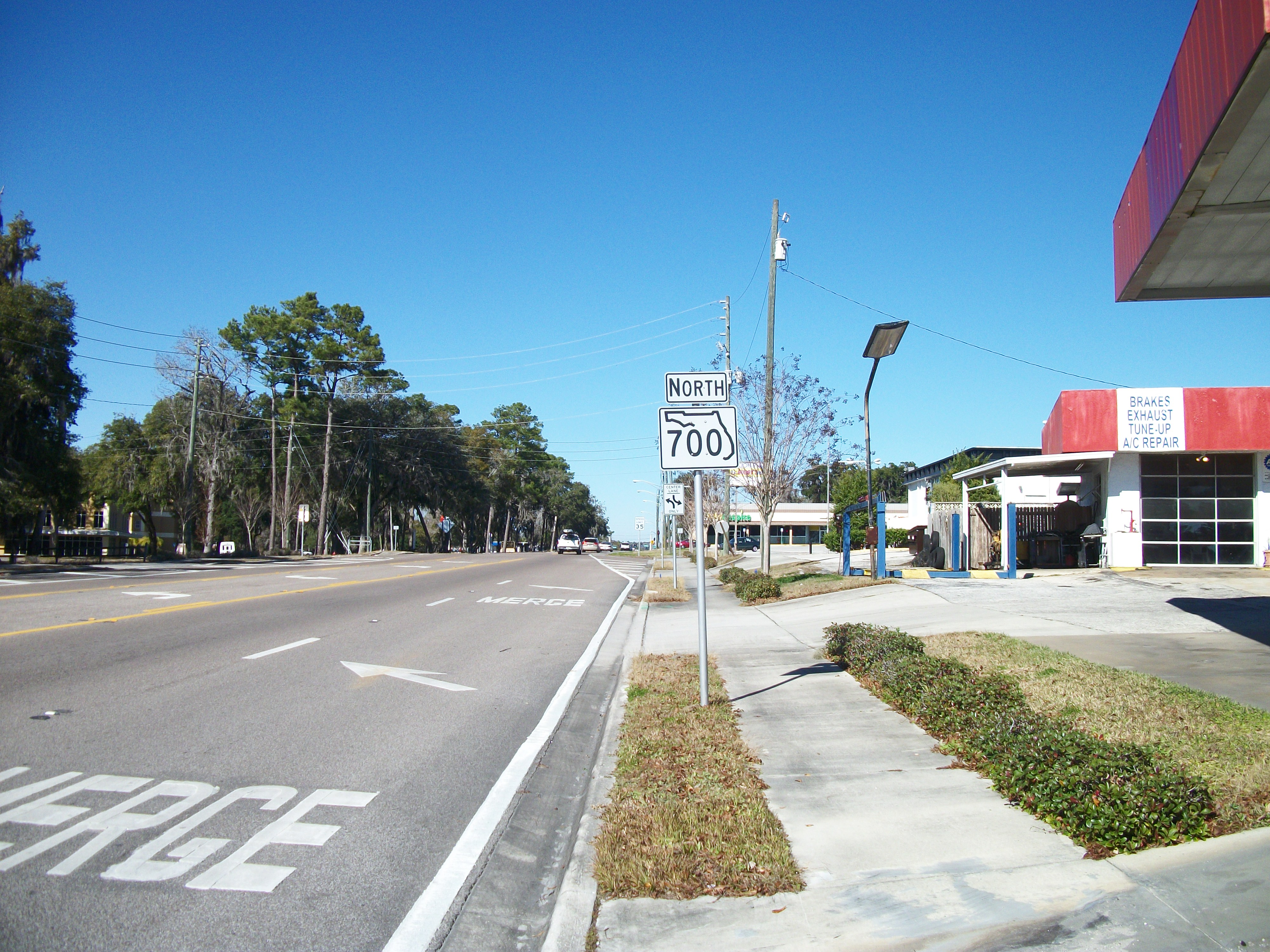
One of the few reassurance signs along independent SR 700, in Brooksville, Florida.

Cities served by US 98/SR 700 include:

- Brooksville
- Dade City
- Lakeland
- Bartow
- Fort Meade
- Avon Park
- Sebring
- Okeechobee
- Canal Point

A 4.847-mile (7.800 km) extension of SR 700 in Palm Beach County to County Road 880 (CR 880) is known as County Road 700.

== Major intersections ==
County	Location	mi	km	Destinations	Notes
Citrus		0.000	0.000	US 19 / US 98 north (South Suncoast Boulevard / SR 55) / CR 480 west (Miss Maggie Drive) – Weeki Wachee, St. Petersburg, Homosassa Springs, Homosassa Springs Wildlife Park	North end of US 98 overlap
see US 98 (mile 409.439-442.917), US 301 (mile 92.506-86.810)
Pasco	Dade City	39.174	63.044	US 98 south / US 301 south (SR 533)	South end of US 98 / US 301 overlap
Pasco	Dade City	39.351	63.329	North end of state maintenance	
Pasco	Dade City	39.8	64.1	SR 52 (Meridian Avenue) to I-75 – Armory, St. Leo	
Pasco	Dade City	40.411	65.035	South end of state maintenance	
Pasco	Dade City	40.485	65.154	US 98 north / US 301 north (SR 533)	North end of US 98 / US 301 overlap; no left turn southbound
see US 301 (mile 85.208-83.074), US 98 (mile 452.349-477.537)
Polk	Lakeland	67.807	109.125	US 92 west (Memorial Boulevard / SR 546) / US 98 south (Florida Avenue / SR 35) to SR 37 / I-4 west – Plant City	South end of US 98 / SR 35 overlap; north end of US 92 / SR 546 overlap
Polk	Lakeland	67.996	109.429	SR 33 (Massachusetts Avenue / Lakeland Hills Boulevard) – Marchant Stadium, Polk City	
Polk	Lakeland	68.811	110.741	US 92 east (Memorial Boulevard / SR 546) – Auburndale	South end of US 92 / SR 546 overlap
Polk	Lakeland	69.545	111.922	East Main Street (SR 600) - Auburndale, Plant City	
Polk	Lakeland	69.947	112.569	US 98 north (Bartow Road / SR 35)	North end of US 98 / SR 35 overlap
see US 98 (mile 479.255-585.442), US 441 (mile 138.841-104.525)
Palm Beach	Canal Point	210.450	338.686	US 98 east / US 441 south / SR 15 south – Pahokee	East end of US 98 / US 441 / SR 15 overlap
Palm Beach		215.925	347.498	SR 717 west (Muck City Road) – Pahokee	
Palm Beach		225.081	362.233	US 98 / US 441 / SR 80 / CR 700 east – West Palm Beach	
1.000 mi = 1.609 km; 1.000 km = 0.621 mi: Concurrency terminus

Spur in Brooksville

The entire route is in Brooksville, Hernando County.

mi	km	Destinations	Notes
0.000	0.000	US 41 south (South Broad Street / SR 45)	
0.330	0.531	US 98 / SR 50A (Jefferson Street / Ponce de Leon Boulevard / SR 700) – Weeki Wachee, Ridge Manor, Homosassa Springs	
1.000 mi = 1.609 km; 1.000 km = 0.621 mi
