= Tiger Bay State Forest =

Protected area in Florida, United States

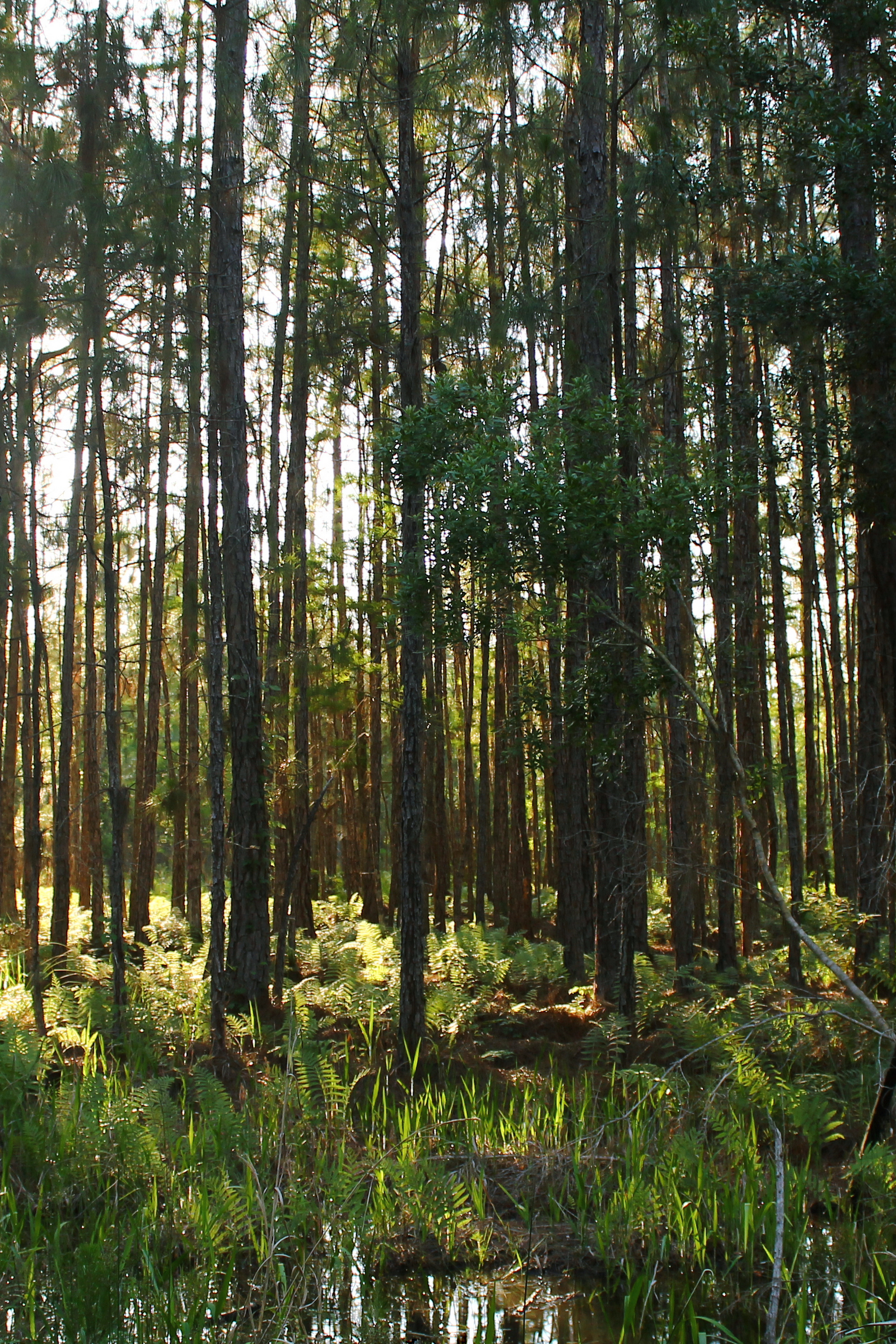
- Slash pines at Tiger Bay State Forest

- Location within Florida
- Location: Volusia County, Florida
- Nearest city: Daytona Beach
- Coordinates: 29°7′N 81°11′W
- Area: 27,330 acres (11,060 ha)
- Governing body: State of Florida (Multiple Agencies)

The Tiger Bay State Forest is in the U.S. state of Florida. The 27,330-acre (11,060 ha) forest is located in Volusia County, Florida, between Daytona Beach and DeLand.

== History ==
Tiger Bay State Forest consists of large areas of swamp with embedded pine islands and a large pine ridge area. The purchase of this forest began in 1977 under the Environmentally Endangered Lands Program, with additional acquisitions made in 1994 and 1998. Tiger Bay State Forest is located among several publicly owned lands which create wildlife corridors for species listed as endangered, threatened or of special concern. Roaming habitat is available for the Florida black bear as well as potential nesting and foraging area for the bald eagle.

Tiger Bay State Forest was severely impacted by the 1998 Summer Wildfire Firestorm. Approximately 15,000 acres (61 km^{2}) of the forest were burned by wildfires. Restoration included extensive salvage timber removal and reforestation efforts have been completed.

== Location ==
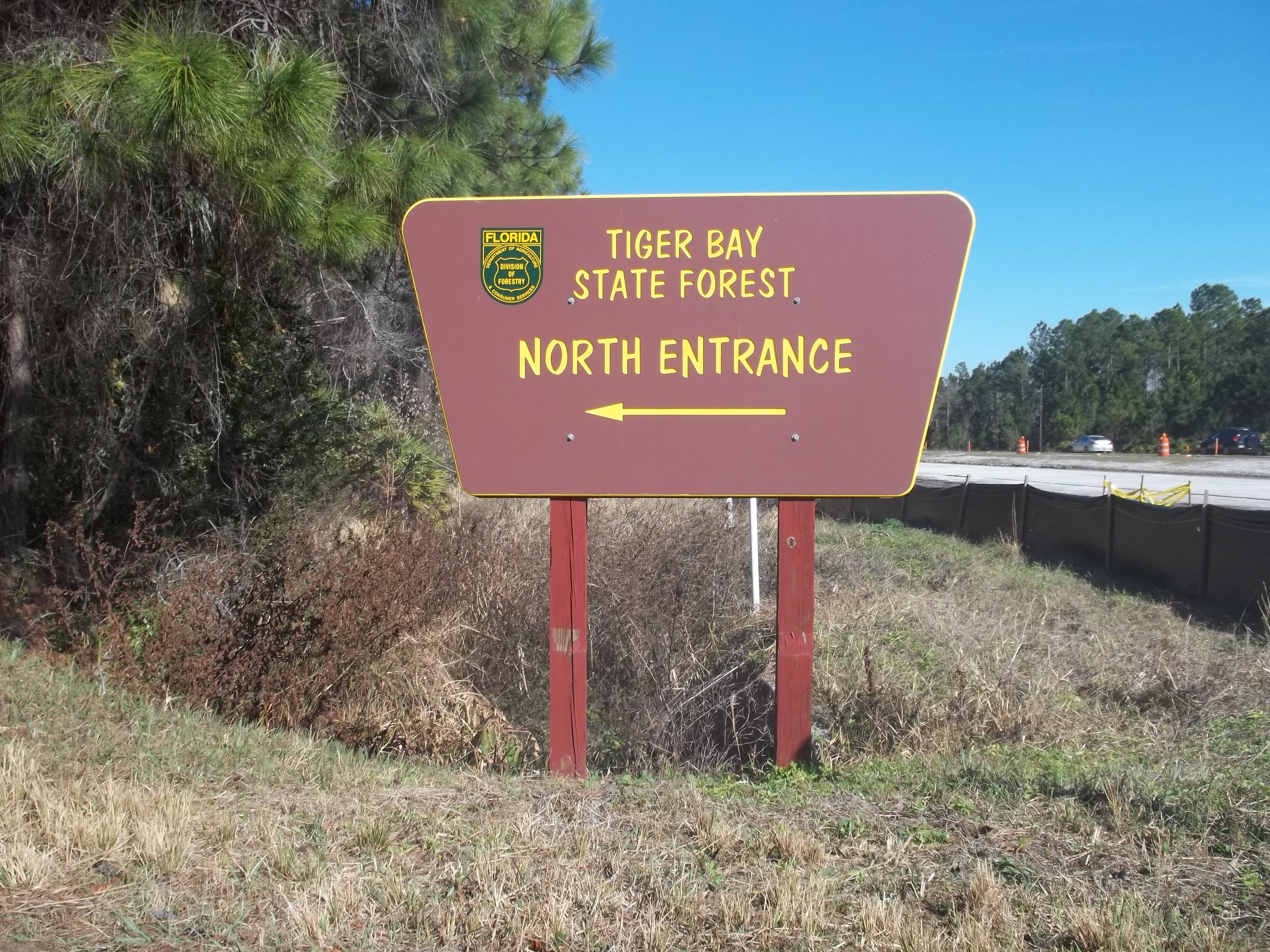
North Entrance sign

Tiger Bay State Forest is located in the central section of Volusia County, approximately 7 miles (11 km) west of Daytona Beach, Florida. The forest extends north and south of US Highway 92.

Three forest access points are located off of U.S. Route 92:

- To access the Rima Ridge Tract, go 4 miles (6.4 km) west of the I-95/US 92 interchange on US 92 and turn north (right) onto Indian Lake Road for approximately 1.7 miles (2.7 km), this road takes you into the forest;
- The South Entrance leading to Rattlesnake Pond is 6 miles (9.7 km) west of I-95/US 92 interchange on US 92, the entrance is on the south (left) side of the road;
- The North Entrance is 7 miles (11 km) west of the I-95/US 92 interchange on US 92, the entrance is on the north (right) side of the road. Access to the Rima Ridge Tract is also available by taking SR 40 approximately 5 miles (8.0 km) west of I-95, the entrance is on the left side of the road. Tiger Bay State Forest office headquarters is located on the north side of US Highway 92, one-half mile west of the South entrance. Parking for horse trailers is available at the headquarters.

== Natural Features ==
Tiger Bay State Forest was named after its largest physiographic feature, Tiger Bay, an extensive wetland that provides a critical aquifer recharge for the local area. Pine islands are dotted throughout the extensive hydric swamp forest and comprise 40% of the property. Also found on the forest are two lakes, Indian Lake and Scoggin Lake, and several ponds. Coon Pond is a natural water body, while Rattlesnake Pond, Woody Pond, and Ranch Pond are man-made ponds that are available to the public for fishing. Three additional unnamed man-made ponds are also located on the forest.

== Recreation ==
Recreational activities include hiking, bicycling, horseback riding, picnicking, boating, fishing, hunting, nature study and photography. Horseback riding and bicycling are allowed on forest roads designated for their use only. Tiger Bay State Forest contains 1 hiking trail (Buncombe) in the Florida Division of Forestry's Trailwalker Hiking Program and 1 equestrian trail (Rima Ridge) in the Division’s TrailTrotter Program. An equestrian campground has been added to the Rima Ridge Tract with 5 primitive campsites, a small horse corral (16’ × 16’), non-potable water supply and water trough for watering horses. Contact Tiger Bay State Forest to obtain State Forest Use Permits for primitive camping.

Tiger Bay State Forest is managed as a Wildlife Management Area by the Florida Fish and Wildlife Conservation Commission (FWC). Indian Lake and Rattlesnake Pond are open for fishing and small boat use. Hunting for whitetail deer, hogs, and small game is permitted during designated seasons.

The Pershing Highway Trail follows a 1-mile (1.6 km) section of brick road built in 1917.

== References and external links ==
- Tiger Bay State Forest: Florida Division of Forestry- FDACS
- Tiger Bay State Forest: Florida Fish and Wildlife Commission
- Tiger Bay State Forest: St. Johns River Water Management District
