= Florida State Road 655 =

State highway in Florida, United States

State Road 655
- Lake Shipp Drive, Recker Highway
- SR 655 in red, CR 655 in blue, CR 655A in magenta

Route information
- Maintained by FDOT
- Length: 7.125 mi (11.467 km)

Major junctions
- West end: US 17 / CR 655 at Eloise
- North end: US 92 in Auburndale

Location
- Country: United States
- State: Florida
- Counties: Polk

Highway system
- Florida State Highway System; Interstate; US; State; Former; Pre‑1945; Toll; Scenic
← SR 651	→ SR 656

State Road 655 (SR 655) is a 7.125-mile-long (11.467 km) state highway in Polk County, Florida, that runs from U.S. Route 17 and County Road 655 at Eloise just south of Winter Haven city limits to U.S. Route 92 in western Auburndale.

== Route description ==
Florida State Road 655 begins at US 17 and the northern terminus of the southern segment of Polk County Road 655. However, due to restrictions on trucks around the region of Lake Shipp, this segment of the route is unmarked. Immediately after the intersection with US 17, SR 655 crosses the railroad tracks of the Florida Midland Railroad Winter Haven Line, then has an intersection with Eagle Lake Road and Seventh Street Southwest. Along the way it runs through a mostly residential area, skirting the southern shores of Lake Shipp.

The route officially enters the City of Winter Haven near Lake Shipp Park, just before the intersection with a four-lane divided highway designated as Florida State Road 620 (Recker Highway), where the route makes a right turn to the north as SRs 620 and 655 overlap with one another. After narrowing down to a two-lane highway at Avenue P, SR 620 officially ends at the intersection with Avenue O, while SR 655 continues along Recker Road. SR 655 curves to the northwest as 21st Street Southwest branches off straight ahead, while SR 655 runs along the southwest side of the CSX Auburndale Subdivision, and will remain on that side of the tracks for roughly several miles. State Road 655 officially leaves the city limits at the intersection with Coleman Road and enters the community of Jan Phyl Village. Within the community, the surroundings evolve from a standard commercial strip to a mix of commercial and light industrial development. The tracks of the Auburndale Subdivision begin to bear slightly off to the right from the route just before the intersection with Spirit Lake Road. North of there, the route curves in the same direction as the tracks, but is still further away from them. At Avenue G Northwest, SR 655 encounters Polk County Road 542 then runs in a hidden overlap with that county road for approximately one block until the CR 542 turns west at K-Ville Avenue.

Shortly after entering Auburndale, the tracks move closer to the road, SR 655 encounters a grade-separated junction with the southern terminus of Florida State Road 559, which takes SR 559 not only over SR 655, but over the Auburndale Subdivision. SR 655 turns away from the Auburndale Subdivision permanently and momentarily moves east to west, until it curves to the north around Auburndale Memorial Park Cemetery, intersecting Thornhill Road in the process of making this curve. Cemetery property ends on the southeast corner of Polk County Road 544A just before crossing the CSX Carters Subdivision. Florida State Road 655 seems to terminate at U.S. Route 92 in western Auburndale. However, a hidden continuation of this route runs along westbound US 92 and hidden SR 600 until it reaches Berkley Road, where it turns north. 6.6 miles (10.6 km) of this segment is signed as Florida State Truck Route 559.

== Major intersections ==
The entire route is in Polk County.

Location	mi	km	Destinations	Notes
Eloise	0.000	0.000	US 17 (Eloise Street Northwest / SR 555) / CR 655 south (Snively Avenue)	Southern terminus; continues beyond US 17 as CR 655
Winter Haven	1.185	1.907	SR 620 south	South end of SR 620 overlap
Winter Haven	1.380	2.221	Avenue O Southwest	North end of SR 620 overlap
Jan Phyl Village	3.780	6.083	CR 542 east (Avenue G Northwest)	South end of CR 542 overlap
Jan Phyl Village	4.056	6.527	CR 542 west (K-Ville Avenue)	North end of CR 542 overlap
Auburndale	5.235	8.425	SR 559 north (Main Street)	Southern terminus of SR 559
Auburndale	6.895	11.096	West Derby Avenue (CR 544A east)	
Auburndale	7.125	11.467	US 92 (SR 600)	Northern terminus
1.000 mi = 1.609 km; 1.000 km = 0.621 mi: Concurrency terminus

== Related routes ==
=== County Road 655 ===
County Road 655
- Location: near Whaneta-Eloise; Auburndale-Polk City
- Length: 14.4 mi (23.2 km)

County Road 655 (CR 655) is a 14.4-mile-long (23.2 km) county road in Polk County, Florida, that is separated into two sections and are both former extensions of SR 655. The southern segment, which is 5.7-mile-long (9.2 km), runs from Florida State Road 60 south of Whaneta to U.S. Route 17 and Florida State Road 655 at Eloise via Whaneta. The northern segment, which is 8.7-mile-long (14.0 km), runs from U.S. Route 92 and Neptune Road in western Auburndale to Florida State Road 33 and Lakeshore Drive in Polk City.

=== Major intersections ===
==== Southern segment ====
The entire route is in Polk County.

Location	mi	km	Destinations	Notes
	0.0	0.0	SR 60	Southern terminus
Whaneta	2.8	4.5	Bomber Road (CR 559 west)	
Whaneta	4.2	6.8	Eloise Loop Road (CR 540A east)	
Eloise	5.7	9.2	US 17 (Eloise Street Northwest / SR 555) / SR 655 north (Snively Avenue)	Northern terminus; continues as SR 655 beyond US 17
1.000 mi = 1.609 km; 1.000 km = 0.621 mi

==== Northern segment ====
The entire route is in Polk County.

Location	mi	km	Destinations	Notes
Auburndale	0.0	0.0	US 92 (SR 600) / Neptune Road	Southern terminus; continues beyond US 92 as Neptune Road
			CR 546 west (Old Dixie Highway) to SR 570	
	6.6	10.6	CR 559A east (C. Fred Jones Boulevard) to I-4	
Polk City	8.7	14.0	SR 33 (Commonwealth Avenue North) / Lakeshore Drive	Northern terminus; continues beyond SR 33 as Lakeshore Drive
1.000 mi = 1.609 km; 1.000 km = 0.621 mi

=== County Road 655A ===
County Road 655A
- Location: Alturas
- Length: 7.191 mi (11.573 km)

County Road 655A (CR 655A) is a 7.2-mile-long (11.6 km) county road in Polk County. It encircles Lake Garfield and provides access to the census designated place of Alturas. Both termini of the county road are at SR 60 and it runs in a horseshoe-shape. It was formerly SR 655A.
