= Florida State Road 566 =

State highway in Florida, United States

State Road 566
- Thonotosassa Road

Route information
- Maintained by FDOT
- Length: 0.925 mi (1,489 m)

Major junctions
- West end: I-4 in Plant City
- East end: US 92 in Plant City

Location
- Country: United States
- State: Florida
- Counties: Hillsborough

Highway system
- Florida State Highway System; Interstate; US; State; Former; Pre‑1945; Toll; Scenic
← SR 563	→ SR 568

State Road 566 (SR 566) is an approximate one-mile-long (1.6 km), northwest-southeast highway near Plant City, Florida that connects Interstate 4 (I-4) to U.S. Route 92 (US 92).

== Route description ==
Thonotosassa Road begins at the intersection of Branch Forbes Road and Stafford Road, heading east on the two lane Strafford Road. State Road 566 enters Plant City and intersects Interstate 4. The road continues east through Plant City as a four-lane divided highway and ends at the intersection of U.S. Route 92 across from the intersection with Berryfest Place west of Downtown Plant City, Florida. Thonotosassa Road itself continues southeast of the route's eastern terminus, first as a frontage road on the north side of US 92 between SR 566 and Mobley Street, and then serves as the beginning of the one-way pairing of US 92 carrying eastbound US 92 until the intersection of Reynolds Road, which continues eastbound US 92 through the city.

== Major intersections ==
The entire route is in Plant City, Hillsborough County.

mi	km	Destinations	Notes
0.000	0.000	Thonotosassa Road	West end of state maintenance
0.000– 0.188	0.000– 0.303	I-4 (SR 400) – Tampa, Orlando, Lakeland	I-4 exit 19
0.925	1.489	US 92 (West Baker Street / SR 600) – truck route to SR 39 south	
1.000 mi = 1.609 km; 1.000 km = 0.621 mi
