= Polk Correctional Institution =

Prison in Polk City, Florida, United States

Coordinates: 28°11′18″N 81°47′08″W

- Interactive map of Polk Correctional Institution
- Location: 10800 Evans Road Polk City, Florida
- Status: mixed
- Capacity: 1208
- Opened: 1978
- Managed by: Florida Department of Corrections

The Polk Correctional Institution is a state prison for men located in Polk City, Polk County, Florida, owned and operated by the Florida Department of Corrections. This facility has a mix of security levels, including minimum, medium, and close, and houses adult male prisoners. Polk first opened in 1978, and has a maximum capacity of 1,208 prisoners.
