= Broadway Bridge (Daytona Beach) =

Bridge in Daytona Beach, Florida, US

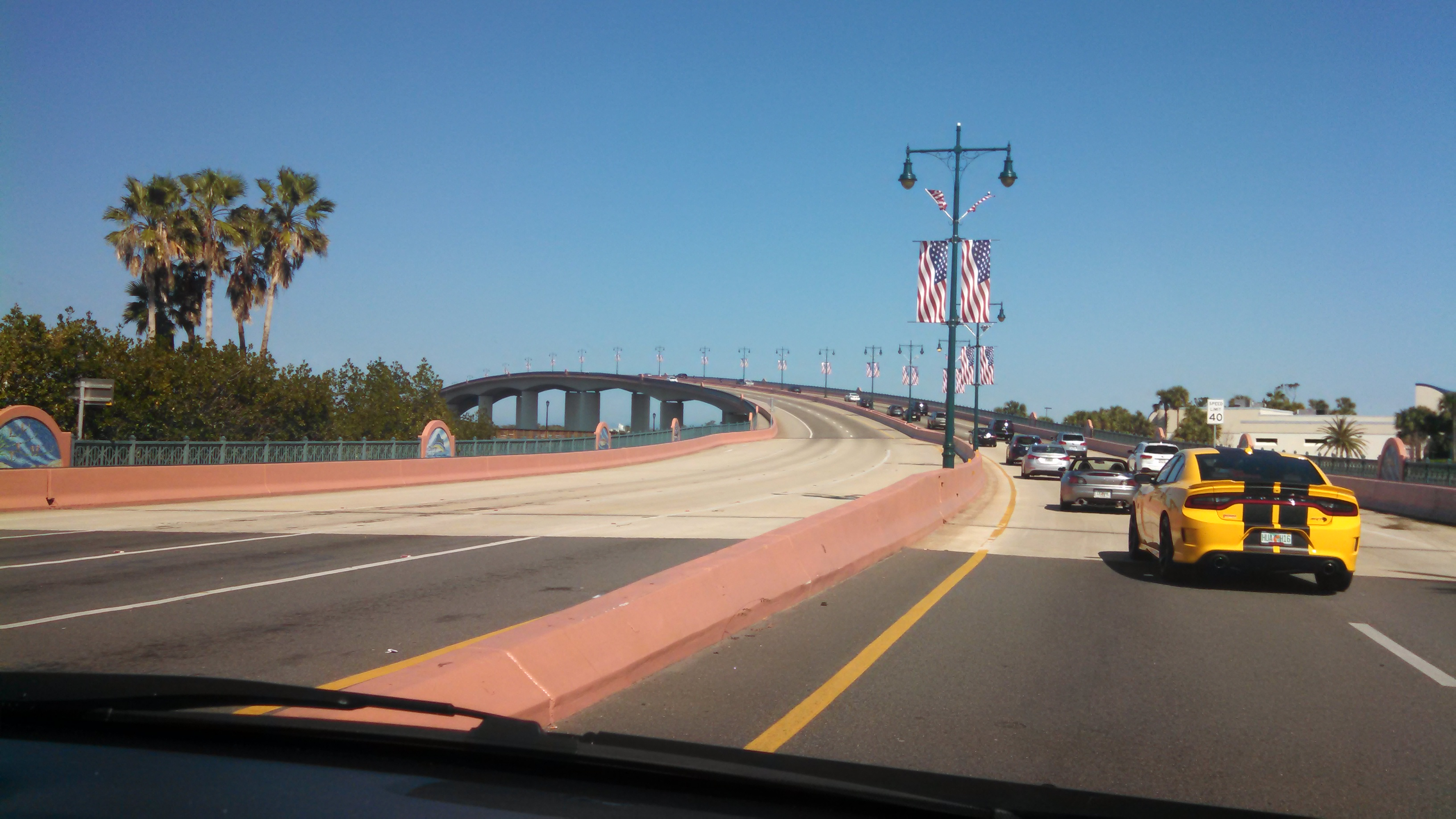
- The bridge after 2015 repaint.
- Coordinates: 29°12′57″N 81°0′56″W
- Carries: 4 lanes of US 92; VOTRAN bus routes pedestrians, and bicycles
- Crosses: Halifax River, Intracoastal Waterway
- Locale: Daytona Beach, Florida
- Official name: Broadway Bridge
- Maintained by: Florida Dept. of Transportation
- ID number: 790187, 790188

Characteristics
- Design: Segmental Box Girder
- Material: Prestressed concrete
- Total length: 917 meters (3,008 feet)
- Clearance below: 19.9 meters (65 feet)

History
- Designer: Figg Engineering Group
- Construction end: 1912 (First bridge); 1947 (Second bridge); 2001 (Third bridge)

Statistics
- Toll: Free

Location
- Interactive map of Broadway Bridge

The Broadway Bridge is a segmental bridge that spans the Halifax River and Intracoastal Waterway in downtown Daytona Beach, Florida, carrying U.S. Route 92.

The Broadway Bridge reaches a height of 65 feet (19.9 m) and is 3,008 feet (917 m) in length. The bridge is more famous for its flair than its purpose. Mosaics of manatees, dolphins and other wildlife native to Florida give the bridge some tourist appeal.

The bridge was dedicated on July 20, 2001.

== History ==
=== First bridge ===
Plans for the original Broadway Bridge were approved by the U.S. Army Corps of Engineers on May 4, 1912. Michael Sholtz (father of future Governor David Sholtz), President of Central of Florida Railway Company, petitioned the Corps for the new bridge which he planned to use for his company's electric streetcar system, that would connect the cities of Daytona, Daytona Beach, and Seabreeze (separate cities at the time, before consolidating in 1926) across the Halifax River.

The bridge was simply referred to as the concrete bridge for many years, until it started to be called the Broadway Bridge. It likely picked up the name because it connected to Broadway Avenue (now named International Speedway Blvd.) on the beach side.

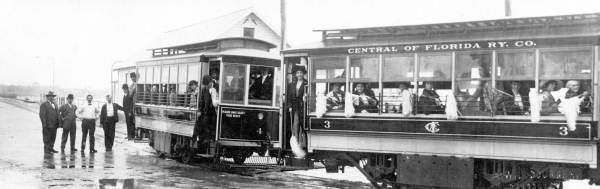
Streetcars of the Central Florida Railway Co. in 1913, with the bridge in the background

=== Second bridge ===
By 1947, the Broadway Bridge was carrying traffic for a spur of State Road A1A and State Road 600. The State Road Department determined a new four-lane drawbridge was needed to replace the old structure. Tidewater Construction Corporation of Norfolk, Virginia, was awarded the contract to construct the bridge, and started work on February 6, 1947. The overall length was 1777 feet with a channel span of 104 feet, allowing 90-foot clearance with the double-leaf bascule (drawbridge) open.

The second Broadway Bridge over the Halifax River was officially opened on November 8, 1948, and dedicated in honor of Robert T. Carleton, Road Department member of the Fifth District, and Elmer Blank, Volusia County Commissioner. Although the name "Carleton-Blank Bridge" appeared on state maps, the local community continued to refer to the structure as the Broadway Bridge.

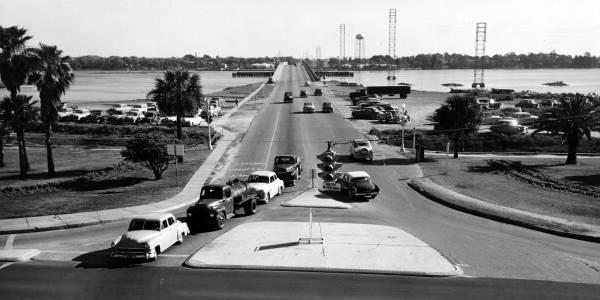
A view of the Carleton-Blank Bridge from 1954, looking eastward.

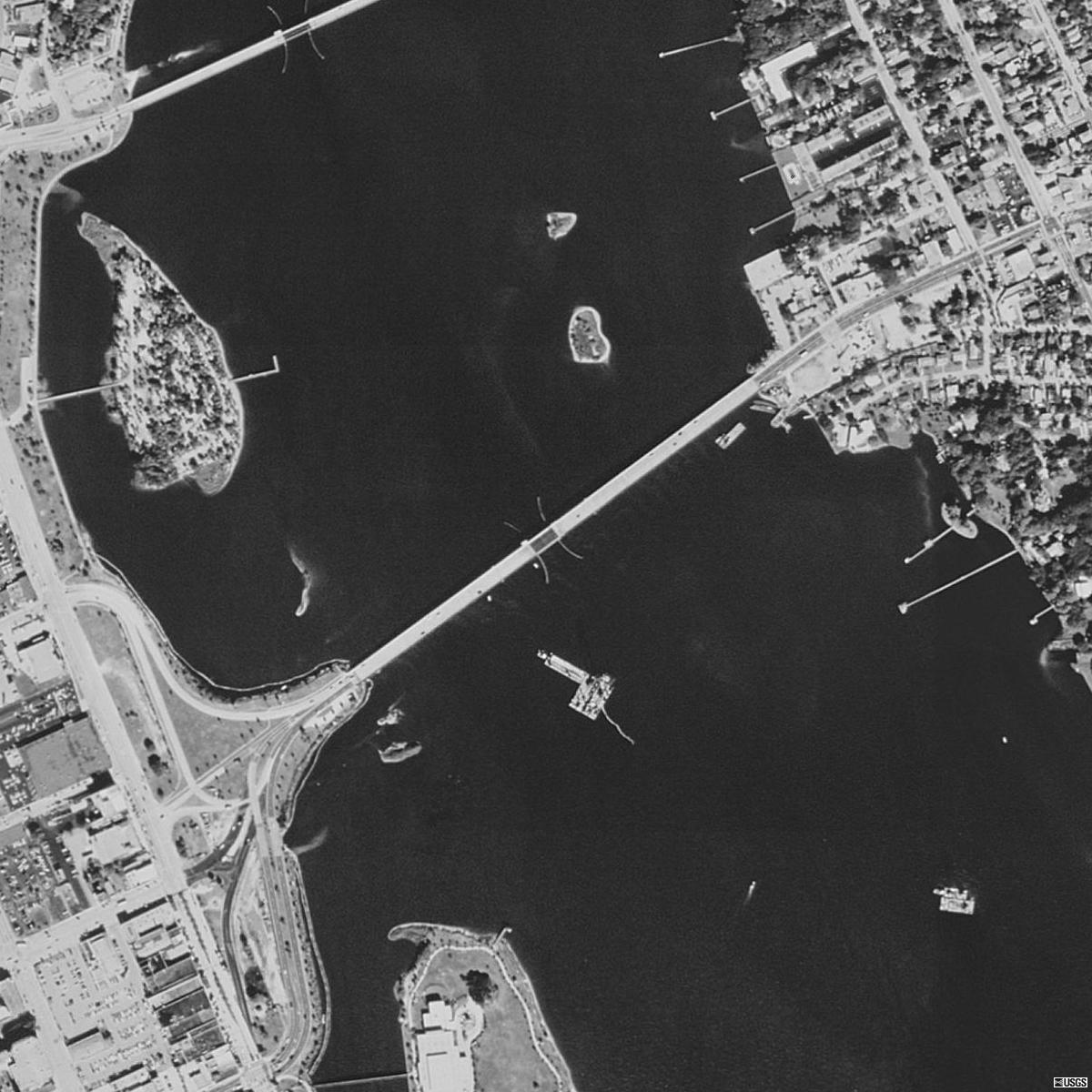
Aerial view of second Broadway Bridge in 1999

=== Third Bridge ===
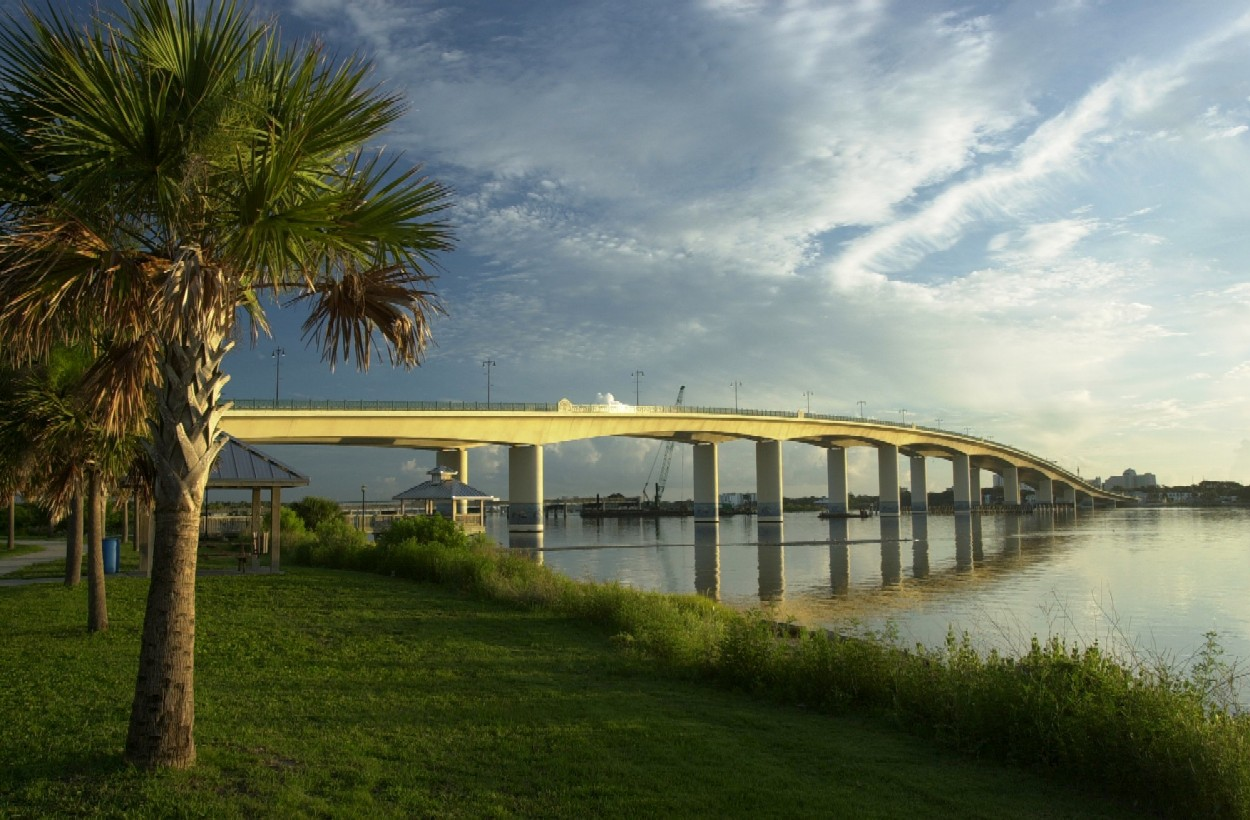
Broadway Bridge in 2004, looking north.

The State Road Department reported that the 1948 lift bridge occurred several problems, and it could be better to build a bigger bridge. Construction on the new bridge started on March 4, 2000.

The new bridge opened on July 20, 2001. The original bridge has since been demolished.

== See also ==
- List of crossings of the Halifax River
