= Florida State Road 33 =

Highway in Florida, US

State Road 33
- SR 33 in red, CR 33 in blue

Route information
- Maintained by FDOT
- Length: 42.687 mi (68.698 km)
- Existed: 1945 renumbering (definition)–present

Major junctions
- South end: US 92 in Lakeland
- I-4 in Lakeland; SR 559 in Polk City
- North end: SR 50 in Mascotte

Location
- Country: United States
- State: Florida
- Counties: Polk, Lake

Highway system
- Florida State Highway System; Interstate; US; State; Former; Pre‑1945; Toll; Scenic
← SR 31	→ SR 35

State Road 33 (SR 33) is a state highway running through Lake and Polk counties in the U.S. state of Florida.

== Route description ==
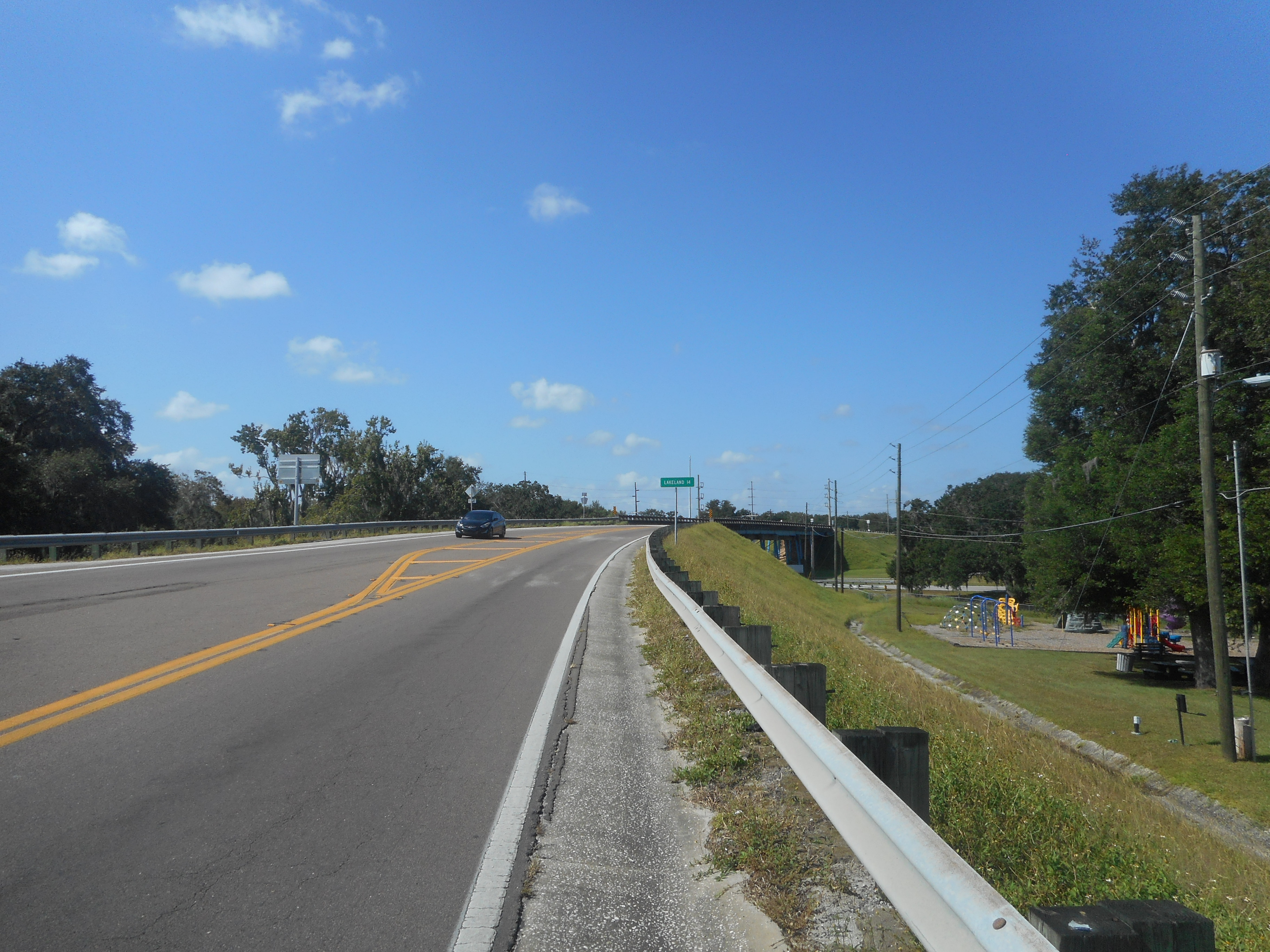
Southbound SR 33 in Polk City approaching a bridge over the Auburndale TECO Trail.

State Road 33 begins in Lakeland off U.S. Route 92 (US 92) east of the intersection with US 98 and heads north along the vicinity of the west bank of Lake Parker. North of there it curves to the northeast and has one of two interchanges with Interstate 4 (I-4). The first interchange (Exit 33) provides westbound access via North Socrum Loop Road (CR 582), and eastbound access directly to SR 33. The route turns more to the east away from I-4, until it curves north at the northern terminus of Florida State Road 659. It has an encounter at the second interchange with I-4 (Exit 38) where it actually crosses under the interstate. The road continues northeast to Polk City where it curves back towards the north at a bridge over a former Seaboard Air Line Railroad line (now the Auburndale TECO Trail and General James A. Van Fleet State Trail) just at the northwestern coast of Lake Agnes. From there, it traverses through mostly rural farmland into Lake County and Groveland. In Groveland, it intersects and begins a 3 miles (4.8 km) concurrency with SR 50, up to Mascotte. Now a county road, CR 33 continues through another 10 miles (16 km) or so of rural farmland, passes over Florida's Turnpike, then has a brief overlap with Lake County Road 48 in Okahumpka, which terminates at the eastern terminus of CR 470, while CR 48 head to Howey-in-the-Hills. Lake CR 33 itself ends on US 27 just south of the bridge over Helena Run, a waterway between Lake Denham and Lake Harris.

== History ==
The current Florida State Road 33 was established during the great renumbering of 1945, after the original SR 33 was replaced by Florida State Road 85 between Fort Walton Beach and Crestview in Okaloosa County. The route originally began at began at U.S. Route 92 (later U.S. Business Route 92, and currently unmarked State Road 600) in Lakeland, Florida and ended at Florida State Road 44 west of the merge with U.S. Route 441 in Leesburg, Florida. It was rerouted in Lakeland from Iowa Avenue one block west to Massachusetts Avenue in the 1970s, with a connecting road between East First Street and north of Bon Aire Street. Some Google Street View images still mistakenly show Iowa Avenue as being part of SR 33. South of the current US 92, SR 33 became a city street within Lakeland, though some traces of Massachusetts Avenue's status as part of SR 33 can still be found in the city, mainly on railroad signal boxes at the crossing of the CSX Carters Subdivision.

North of SR 50 in Mascotte, the road was downgraded to a county road. North of U.S. Route 27 in Okahumpka, the route was extended in a hidden overlap with US 27 and hidden SR 25 until it branched off at Dixie Avenue in Leesburg. The US 27/SRs 25-33 bridge over Lake Harris contained a roadside park, which was later converted into the Leesburg Fishing Area. This segment was eliminated as part of the realignment of SR 44 in Leesburg during the mid-1980s, and the county portion has been truncated at US 27 in Okahumpka ever since.

== Major intersections ==
County	Location	mi	km	Destinations	Notes
Polk	Lakeland	0.000	0.000	US 92 (Memorial Boulevard / SR 546) – Auburndale, Plant City	
Polk	Lakeland	2.931	4.717	CR 582 north (North Socrum Loop Road) to I-4 west – Tampa	
Polk	Lakeland	3.572	5.749	I-4 east (SR 400) – Orlando	I-4 exit 33
Polk	Lakeland	6.046	9.730	SR 659 south (North Combee Road)	Former SR 33A, and CR 33A
Polk	Lakeland	7.69	12.38	I-4 (SR 400) – Tampa, Orlando	I-4 exit 38
Polk	Polk City	13.503	21.731	CR 655 south (Berkley Road) – Auburndale	Former SR 655
Polk	Polk City	13.702	22.051	SR 559 south (Broadway Boulevard) to I-4 – Fantasy of Flight, Lake Alfred	
Polk–Lake county line				Bridge over Withlacoochee River	
Lake		27.460	44.193	CR 474 east	
Lake		29.803	47.963	CR 561 north – Clermont	
Lake		36.547	58.817	CR 565B east (Pine Island Road)	
Lake	Groveland	40.216	64.721	SR 50 east – Clermont	south end of SR 50 overlap; signage changes northbound from SR 33 to CR 33
Lake	Groveland	40.541	65.244	SR 19 north (Lake Avenue) to Florida's Turnpike north – Howey-in-the-Hills	Southern terminus of SR 19
Lake	Groveland	41.312	66.485	CR 565 north (Villa City Road)	
Lake	Mascotte	42.687	68.698	SR 50 west – Brooksville	north end of SR 50 overlap and state maintenance
Lake	Leesburg	54.1	87.1	CR 48 west – Center Hill, Webster	south end of CR 48 overlap
Lake	Okahumpka	54.7	88.0	CR 48 east / CR 470 west to Florida's Turnpike – Sumterville, Howey-in-the-Hills	north end of CR 48 overlap
Lake		56.049	90.202	US 27 (SR 25)	
1.000 mi = 1.609 km; 1.000 km = 0.621 mi: Concurrency terminus

== Related routes ==
=== SR-CR 33A ===
State Road 33A and County Road 33A
- Location: Eaton Park-Lakeland, Florida
- Length: 7.625 mi (12.271 km)

State Road 33A served as a suffixed alternate route for SR 33 from Eaton Park, Florida to the northern reaches of Lakeland, Florida. It began at US 98 in Eaton Park, ran north through Crystal Lake and Combee Settlement at US 92, and finally terminated at SR 33 south of Interstate 4. It is mainly known as South Combee Road south of Polk County Road 542 and North Combee Road north of CR 542. At some point in the 1980s, the route was downgraded into County Road 33A. Today it is designated as Florida State Road 659, though the old route number still shows up in many street name signs and on Google maps.
