= Florida State Road 539 =

State highway in Florida, United States

State Road 539
- Kathleen Road

Route information
- Maintained by FDOT
- Length: 2.516 mi (4.049 km)

Major junctions
- South end: SR 563 in Lakeland
- North end: I-4 / CR 35A in Lakeland

Location
- Country: United States
- State: Florida
- Counties: Polk

Highway system
- Florida State Highway System; Interstate; US; State; Former; Pre‑1945; Toll; Scenic
← SR 538	→ SR 540

State Road 539 (SR 539) is a 2.5-mile-long (4.0 km) northwest–southeast route in Lakeland. SR 539 is also known as Kathleen Road, and is one of the main routes connecting downtown Lakeland with Interstate 4 (I-4).

== Route description ==
Florida State Road 539 begins at Florida State Road 563 on the west side of Lake Wire, where Sikes Boulevard becomes Kathleen Road and SR 563 makes a right turn from Sikes onto Martin Luther King Junior Avenue. One block after the southern terminus, the route encounters the intersection with Florida State Road 548, also known as George Jenkins Boulevard and the Lakeland In-Town Bypass. North of the intersection with People's Lane, SR 539 and Kathleen Road runs parallel to the east side of the CSX Vitis Subdivision, both of which run under a 1966-built bridge for U.S. Route 92 (hidden SR 546). Access to US 92 can be found south of this bridge at the intersection with Quincy Street then to Lincoln Avenue.

North of the US 92 bridge, SR 539 moves straight north away from the tracks then curves back to the northwest at the intersection with West Sixth Street. Beyond this point, there are only three signalized intersections of relative local importance, two of which cross the CSX line. The first is West 10th Street, which runs from the western outskirts of the city to the Watson neighborhood. The second is with Montrose Avenue and West 14th Street. Montrose leads to West 10th Street east of the tracks while West 14th leads to the Harmony Hills neighborhood. The third is Fairbanks Street The intersection with Fairbanks Street is also shared by Interstate Drive, which leads to some industrial zoning and the Lakeland campus of Keiser University. Florida State Road 539 ends at Exit 31 on Interstate 4, but Kathleen Road continues along Polk County Road 35A, where it runs through Kathleen and Socrum before ending at US 98 (hidden SR 35).

== History ==
State Road 539 was previously designated as Florida State Road 35A, a suffixed alternate of State Road 35, and one of the two hidden state roads of U.S. Route 98. Historically, the route that became SR 35A also included Old Dade City Highway, and ran as far north as Branchborough. In fact, it even crossed US 98 and looped back across from the intersection with Pasco County Road 54, leading to Pasco County Road 35A. By the late-1960's, SR 35A was extended south towards Lake Wire, and then south across the railroad tracks to West Main Street and West Lemon Street, both of which are former US BUS 92/SR 600. When that route was downgraded as a county road in the late-1970's, the segment south of I-4 was redesignated SR 539. The southern terminus was truncated to Lake Wire when FL 563 was extended south into Lakeland Civic Center.

The route was realigned in the late-2000's as part of the construction for the western extension of SR 548, and two of the former segments of SR 539 were converted into local streets known as "People's Lane" north of the Lakeland In-Town Bypass, and "Prospect Street" south of the bypass. Both segments became dead-end streets upon their encounters with the embankments for SR 548. Prospect Street was eliminated as part of the construction of the Prospect Lake Wire Apartment complex, currently scheduled to open in late summer of 2024.

== Major intersections ==
The entire route is in Lakeland, Polk County.

mi	km	Destinations	Notes
0.000	0.000	SR 563 (Sikes Boulevard / Martin L. King Jr. Avenue)	
0.118	0.190	SR 548 (George Jenkins Boulevard)	
0.622	1.001	To US 92 (SR 546) / Quincy Street	
2.37	3.81	I-4 (SR 400) – Tampa, Orlando	I-4 exit 31
2.516	4.049	CR 35A north (Kathleen Road)	north end of state maintenance
1.000 mi = 1.609 km; 1.000 km = 0.621 mi
