= Florida State Road 37 =

Highway in Florida, US

State Road 37

Route information
- Maintained by FDOT
- Length: 34.227 mi (55.083 km)
- Existed: 1945 renumbering–present

Major junctions
- South end: SR 62 in Duette
- SR 60 in Mulberry; SR 570 in Lakeland
- North end: SR 35 / SR 600 in Lakeland

Location
- Country: United States
- State: Florida
- Counties: Manatee, Hillsborough, Polk

Highway system
- Florida State Highway System; Interstate; US; State; Former; Pre‑1945; Toll; Scenic
← SR 35	→ SR 39

State Road 37 (SR 37) is a state highway in Manatee and Polk counties in Florida, United States, that also passes through the very extreme southeast corner of Hillsborough. It connects Florida State Road 62 (SR 62) in Duette, Florida with Florida State Road 35 / Florida State Road 600 (Main Street) in Lakeland. It is signed as Church Avenue in Mulberry and South Florida Avenue in Lakeland.

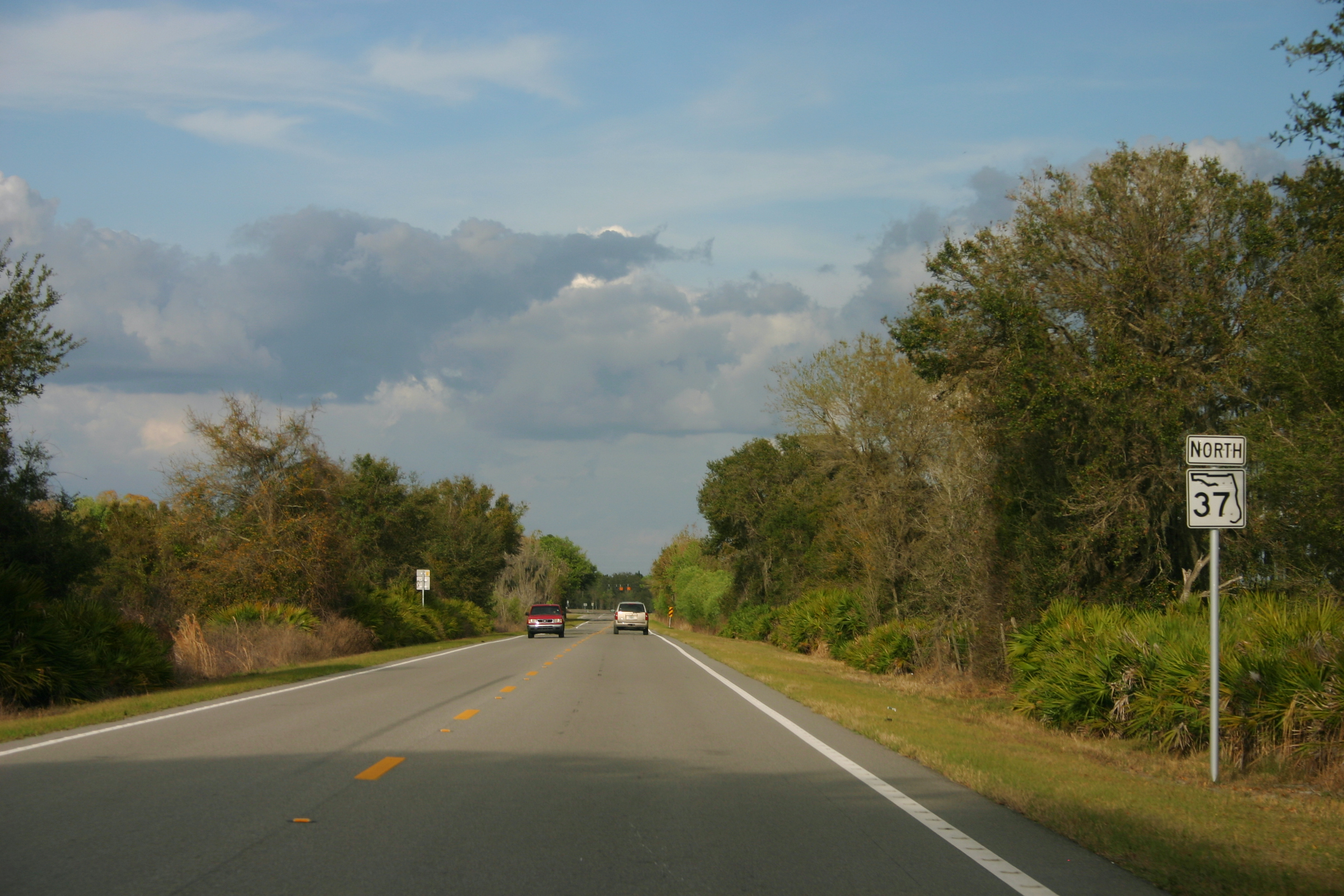
Northbound on Florida State Road 37 near Duette, February 2012.

== Route description ==
From its southern terminus at SR 62 in the tiny town of Duette in Manatee County, it travels in a northeastern direction, briefly entering the "Four Corners" section of Hillsborough County before entering Polk County. For most of its length south of Florida State Road 60 (SR 60) in Mulberry, SR 37 is a lonely stretch of road with oak hammocks and occasional phosphate mines. From SR 60 to its northern terminus at West Main Street in Lakeland, it serves as the north/south dividing line of the street grids of both Mulberry and Lakeland.

== History ==
The current Florida State Road 37 was established during the great renumbering of 1945, as a replacement for Florida State Road 34.

The road was originally built to provide easy access between Bradenton (via SR 62) and Lakeland, although it was mostly bypassed after the construction of the faster I-4 and I-75.

== Major intersections ==
County	Location	mi	km	Destinations	Notes
Manatee	Duette	0.000	0.000	SR 62 – Wauchula, Parrish	Southern terminus
Hillsborough	No major junctions				
Polk		10.081	16.224	SR 674 west – Wimauma, Ruskin	
Polk		13.095	21.074	CR 630 east – Fort Meade, Frostproof	
Polk	Pine Dale	20.671	33.267	CR 640	
Polk	Mulberry	23.743	38.211	SR 60 – Tampa, Bartow	
Polk	Lakeland Highlands–Medulla line	27.818	44.769	CR 540A east / Ewell Road	
Polk	Lakeland	30.91	49.74	SR 570 (Polk Parkway) / Parkway Frontage Road North to Drane Field Road (SR 572) – Tampa, Orlando, Lakeland Linder International Airport	SR 570 Exit 7
Polk	Lakeland	34.227	55.083	SR 35 / SR 600 – Plant City	Northern terminus
1.000 mi = 1.609 km; 1.000 km = 0.621 mi

== See also ==
- List of state highways in Florida
- List of highways numbered 37
