= Combee Settlement, Florida =

- Census-designated place
- Location in Polk County and the state of Florida
- Coordinates: 28°03′35″N 81°54′19″W
- Country: United States
- State: Florida
- County: Polk

Area
  - Total: 1.99 sq mi (5.15 km^{2})
  - Land: 1.98 sq mi (5.12 km^{2})
  - Water: 0.012 sq mi (0.03 km^{2})
- Elevation: 138 ft (42 m)

Population (2020)
  - Total: 5,911
  - Density: 2,990.8/sq mi (1,154.76/km^{2})
- Time zone: UTC-5 (Eastern (EST))
  - Summer (DST): UTC-4 (EDT)
- ZIP Code: 33801
- FIPS code: 12-13775
- GNIS feature ID: 2402791

Combee Settlement is a census-designated place and unincorporated area in Polk County, Florida, United States. As of the 2020 census, Combee Settlement had a population of 5,911. It is part of the Lakeland–Winter Haven Metropolitan Statistical Area. The area includes the separate unincorporated community of Country Club Estates.

== Geography ==
Combee Settlement is located approximately three miles ENE of Lakeland.

According to the United States Census Bureau, the CDP has a total area of 5.5 km^{2} (2.1 mi^{2}), all land.

== Demographics ==
Historical population
Census	Pop.	Note	%±
1960	2,697		—
1970	4,963		84.0%
1980	5,400		8.8%
1990	5,463		1.2%
2000	5,436		−0.5%
2010	5,577		2.6%
2020	5,911		6.0%

=== 2020 census ===
As of the 2020 census, Combee Settlement had a population of 5,911. The median age was 35.6 years. 25.4% of residents were under the age of 18 and 12.8% of residents were 65 years of age or older. For every 100 females there were 98.1 males, and for every 100 females age 18 and over there were 94.1 males age 18 and over.

100.0% of residents lived in urban areas, while 0.0% lived in rural areas.

There were 2,181 households in Combee Settlement, of which 31.8% had children under the age of 18 living in them. Of all households, 35.9% were married-couple households, 22.8% were households with a male householder and no spouse or partner present, and 28.1% were households with a female householder and no spouse or partner present. About 24.3% of all households were made up of individuals and 8.5% had someone living alone who was 65 years of age or older.

There were 2,440 housing units, of which 10.6% were vacant. The homeowner vacancy rate was 2.0% and the rental vacancy rate was 8.8%.

Racial composition as of the 2020 census
Race	Number	Percent
White	3,693	62.5%
Black or African American	694	11.7%
American Indian and Alaska Native	40	0.7%
Asian	49	0.8%
Native Hawaiian and Other Pacific Islander	5	0.1%
Some other race	684	11.6%
Two or more races	746	12.6%
Hispanic or Latino (of any race)	1,645	27.8%

=== 2010 census ===
In 2010 Combee Settlement had a population of 5,577. The racial and ethnic makeup of the population was 69.8% non-Hispanic white, 9.2% black or African American, 0.8% Native American, 0.7% Asian, 0.2% non-Hispanic reporting some other race, 3.0% reporting two or more races and 18.2% Hispanic or Latino.

=== 2000 census ===
At the 2000 census there were 5,436 people, 2,193 households, and 1,429 families in the CDP. The population density was 990.0/km^{2} (2,563.3/mi^{2}). There were 2,488 housing units at an average density of 453.1/km^{2} (1,173.2/mi^{2}). The racial makeup of the CDP was 87.91% White, 5.72% African American, 0.88% Native American, 0.64% Asian, 0.04% Pacific Islander, 2.92% from other races, and 1.88% from two or more races. Hispanic or Latino of any race were 6.40%.

Of the 2,193 households 28.5% had children under the age of 18 living with them, 45.2% were married couples living together, 13.8% had a female householder with no husband present, and 34.8% were non-families. 26.8% of households were one person and 9.7% were one person aged 65 or older. The average household size was 2.48 and the average family size was 2.97.

The age distribution was 24.6% under the age of 18, 8.8% from 18 to 24, 29.8% from 25 to 44, 23.4% from 45 to 64, and 13.4% 65 or older. The median age was 36 years. For every 100 females, there were 100.7 males. For every 100 females age 18 and over, there were 97.7 males.

The median household income was $30,923 and the median family income was $35,532. Males had a median income of $26,523 versus $21,267 for females. The per capita income for the CDP was $14,461. About 14.4% of families and 19.5% of the population were below the poverty line, including 22.9% of those under age 18 and 12.8% of those age 65 or over.
