= Florida State Road 35 =

Highway in Florida, US

State Road 35

Route information
- Maintained by FDOT
- Length: 179.218 mi (288.423 km)

Major junctions
- South end: US 41 in Punta Gorda
- North end: SR 40 / CR 35 in Silver Springs

Location
- Country: United States
- State: Florida
- Counties: Charlotte, DeSoto, Hardee, Polk, Pasco, Hernando, Sumter, Marion

Highway system
- Florida State Highway System; Interstate; US; State; Former; Pre‑1945; Toll; Scenic
← SR 33	→ SR 37

State Road 35 (SR 35) is a north–south state highway in the western counties of the U.S. state of Florida.

== Route description ==
It is mainly signed as a hidden route along U.S. Highways:

- U.S. Route 17: Punta Gorda to Bartow.
- U.S. Route 98: Zolfo Springs to Trilacoochee (which also carries hidden SR 700).
- U.S. Route 301: south of Dade City to Belleview

In Bartow, SR 35 turns west and follows East Main Street, before turning north again on North Broadway Avenue, and rejoining US 98 again at SR 60 (Van Fleet Drive).

Evidence of SR 35's existence can be found in Hardee County, Florida along County Roads 35A & 35B in Coker, Wauchula, and Zolfo Springs. Polk County's evidence of SR 35's existence can be found with County Road 35A between Lakeland and Providence, and in Pasco County, Florida, evidence of SR 35's existence can be found with County Road 35 Alternate between Branchborough and Dade City. According to some maps, County Road 41 Alternate (Spring Valley Road) was previously known as CR 35B, and was extended to US 98-301 north of Dade City along Frazee Hill Road.

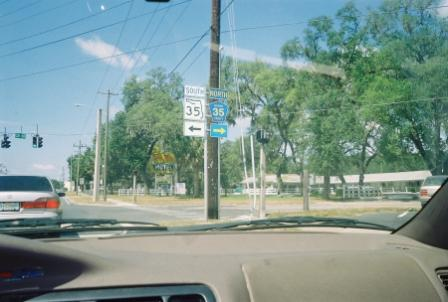
SR 35 becomes CR 35 in Silver Springs, Florida.

Within Belleview, the road is briefly co-signed with US 27-441 (SR 25-500) then turns right at the eastern terminus of CR 484, where it is signed independently along Southeast Hames Road, and then turns left again at Baseline Road, where it curves north as it leaves the city. While State Road 35 terminates at State Road 40 near the site of the former Wild Waters water park in Silver Springs, the road continues northward as County Road 35 through the intersection with State Road 326, passing through Indian Lake State Forest where it finally terminates at Northeast 90th Street Road and Northeast 97th Street Road.

== Major intersections ==
County	Location	mi	km	Destinations	Notes
Charlotte	Punta Gorda	0.000	0.000	US 41 south (Cross Street / SR 45) – Fort Myers	
Charlotte	Punta Gorda	0.184	0.296	US 41 north (SR 45) – Port Charlotte	
see US 17 (mile 0.000-73.861)
Polk	Bartow	73.861	118.868	US 17 north / US 98 north (Spessard Holland Parkway / SR 555 / SR 700) to SR 60 east / East Main Street – Winter Haven, Lake Wales	south end of US 17 / US 98 / SR 700 overlap; north end of state maintenance; former SR 60 Bus. east
Polk	Bartow	74.760	120.315	West Main Street - Mulberry	former SR 60 Bus. west
Polk	Bartow	75.281	121.153	US 98 south / SR 60 (SR 700 south) to US 17 – Vero Beach, Fort Meade, Mulberry, Tampa	south end of US 98 / SR 700 overlap; south end of state maintenance
Polk	see US 98 (mile 490.421-478.720)				
Polk	Lakeland	86.982	139.984	US 98 north / SR 548 west / Main Street (SR 600 east)	north end of US 98 overlap; north end of state maintenance; south end of SR 600 overlap
Polk	Lakeland	87.777	141.263	SR 37 south (Florida Avenue) to Main Street (SR 600 west) (Polk Parkway) / SR 570	north end of SR 600 overlap; south end of state maintenance
Polk	Lakeland	88.159	141.878	US 98 south / SR 548 (George Jenkins Boulevard)	south end of US 98 overlap
see US 98 (mile 477.900-452.349), US 301 (mile 83.074-85.208)
Pasco	Dade City	115.844	186.433	US 98 north / US 301 north (SR 533)	north end of US 98 / US 301 overlap; no left turn southbound
Pasco	Dade City	115.918	186.552	north end of state maintenance	
Pasco	Dade City	116.5	187.5	CR 52 (Meridian Avenue) to I-75 – St. Leo, Armory	
Pasco	Dade City	116.978	188.258	south end of state maintenance	
Pasco	Dade City	117.155	188.543	US 98 south / US 301 south (SR 533)	south end of US 98 / US 301 overlap
see US 301 (mile 86.810-138.030)
Marion	Belleview	168.375	270.973	US 27 / US 301 north / US 441 (SR 500)	
Marion	Belleview	Gap in route			
Marion	Belleview	0.000	0.000	SR 25 north / CR 25 east	
Marion		5.450	8.771	SR 464 west / CR 464 east – Ocala, Ocklawaha	
Marion		9.176	14.767	CR 314 east (Northeast 7th Street)	
Marion	Silver Springs	10.843	17.450	SR 40 / CR 35 north – Ocala, Ormond Beach	
1.000 mi = 1.609 km; 1.000 km = 0.621 mi: Concurrency terminus

== Related roads ==
=== County Road 35 in Marion County ===
County Road 35
- Location: Silver Springs

County Road 35 is a northern extension of SR 35. It begins at SR 35 & 40 in Silver Springs and continues north to make a reverse turn before the intersection with SR 326. From there it returns to its previous trajectory then winds through Indian Lake State Forest where it reaches its northern terminus at Northeast 90th Street Road and Northeast 97th Street Road.

=== County Road 35A in Hardee County ===
County Road 35A
- Location: Zolfo Springs-Coker

County Road 35A is a suffixed alternate of SR 35. The route runs along Florida Avenue from Florida State Road 64 just west of the Peace River Bridge and Zolfo Springs to US 17 in Coker north of Wauchula.

=== County Road 35B in Hardee County ===
County Road 35B
- Location: Wauchula-Coker

County Road 35B is another suffixed alternate of SR 35. The roads have included Terrell Road and Louisiana Street in Wauchula and Metheny Road in Coker.

=== County Road 35A in Polk County ===
County Road 35A
- Location: Lakeland-Providence

County Road 35A is a spur of SR 35 in the northwestern Lakeland area. It begins at Interstate 4 and State Road 539 at Exit 31. The route runs along the east side of the CSX Vitis Subdivision until it reaches Kathleen, where it turns straight north. From there it eventually reunites with SR 35.

The entire route is in Polk County.

Location	mi	km	Destinations	Notes
	0.0	0.0	I-4 south / SR 539	Exit 31 (I-4); northern terminus of SR 539
Griffin			CR 582 (Knights Station Road/Griffin Road)	
Galloway			CR 542A (North Galloway Avenue)	
Kathleen			Duff Road	Unmarked connecting road to US 98
			Old Dade City Road	
Providence			US 98	
1.000 mi = 1.609 km; 1.000 km = 0.621 mi

=== Pasco County Alternate ===
County Road 35 Alternate
- Location: Branchborough-Dade City

County Road 35 Alternate is the bannered route of SR 35 in the southeastern Pasco County. The route begins on Berry Boulevard at County Road 54 in Branchborough just west of the Hillsborough River, and curves to the west onto Melrose Avenue where it approaches Vitis, where CSX's Yeoman Subdivision and Vitis Subdivision merge into the Wildwood Subdivision. The route then turns right onto the Zephyrhills Bypass(CR 535). From there it is named Old Lakeland Highway and follows the west side of the Wildwood Subdivision past an unnumbered interchange with US 98 near Ellerslie, and eventually terminates at US 98/301 in Dade City. Since turns are restricted at this north end, Dick Jarrett Way provides several movements.

The entire route is in Pasco County.

Location	mi	km	Destinations	Notes
Branchborough	0.0	0.0	CR 54 west	
Lumberton			CR 54 Alt. (Merrick Road)	
Richland			CR 535 south (Old Lakeland Highway) to CR 530	CR 35 ALT turns north onto Old Lakeland Highway
Richland			US 98 – Dade City, Lakeland	Interchange with single two-lane on and off-ramp on southwest corner
			CR 52 Alt. west (Clinton Avenue)	
Dade City			Dick Jarratt Way (To US 98 south / US 301 south)	
Dade City			US 98 north / US 301 north	Roundabout
1.000 mi = 1.609 km; 1.000 km = 0.621 mi

=== Former County Road 35B ===
County Road 35B
- Location: Dade City-Blanton

Former County Road 35B was shown on some maps as Spring Valley Road between both ends of County Road 41 from north of Dade City to Blanton, and US 98-301 north of Dade City along Payne Road, Fourteenth Street and Frazee Hill Road. Today, Frazee Hill Road, 14th Street, and Payne Road are strictly local streets, and Spring Valley Road is County Road Alternate 41.
