= Florida State Road 544 =

State highway in Florida, United States

State Road 544
- SR 544 in red, CR 544 in blue, CR 544A in purple

Route information
- Maintained by FDOT
- Length: 11.647 mi (18.744 km)

Major junctions
- West end: US 92 in Auburndale
- US 17 in Winter Haven; US 27 in Winter Haven
- East end: SR 17 / CR 544 in Haines City

Location
- Country: United States
- State: Florida
- Counties: Polk

Highway system
- Florida State Highway System; Interstate; US; State; Former; Pre‑1945; Toll; Scenic
← SR 542	→ SR 546

State Road 544 (SR 544) is a west–east state road in the U.S. state of Florida. It runs 11.6 miles (18.7 km) from Auburndale to Haines City.

== Route description ==
SR 544 breaks off at a diagonal intersection from U.S. Route 92 (US 92) in Auburndale and heads east-southeast toward Winter Haven as Havendale Boulevard; the name derives from the two cities it connects. In Winter Haven, it straightens out eastward as Avenue T North, conforming to Winter Haven's systematic road-naming grid plan.

As SR 544 leaves Winter Haven, it becomes Lucerne Park Road, also going by the title Scenic Highway. It winds north and east around Lake Conine, Lake Smart, and Lake Fannie, and bypasses the community of Lucerne Park, on its way toward southern Haines City. SR 544 crosses US 27 and enters the Haines City city limits shortly afterward, passing by a landmark tall-steepled First Presbyterian Church. SR 544 also bypasses Alta Vista Elementary School, then intersects with SR 17; the Haines City Post Office marks a corner of this junction. SR 544 ends at SR 17; across this intersection is County Road 544 (CR 544), which leads toward Grenelefe.

== Major intersections ==
The entire route is in Polk County.

Location	mi	km	Destinations	Notes
Auburndale	0.000	0.000	US 92 (SR 600) – Lakeland, Lake Alfred	
Auburndale	0.345	0.555	CR 544A west (Derby Avenue)	
Winter Haven	3.183	5.123	US 17 (8th Street Northwest / SR 555) – Lake Alfred, Legoland, Bartow, Chain of Lakes Baseball Stadium	
Winter Haven	3.681	5.924	SR 549 south (First Street North) – Downtown Winter Haven, Polk State College	
Winter Haven	9.853	15.857	US 27 (SR 25) to I-4 – Haines City, Lake Wales	
Haines City	11.647	18.744	SR 17 / CR 544 east – Haines City, Lake Wales, Historic District	
1.000 mi = 1.609 km; 1.000 km = 0.621 mi

== Related roads ==
=== County Road 544 ===
County Road 544
- Location: Haines City

County Road 544 (CR 544) exists in two separate places:

- One segment has both termini on Lucerne Park Road (SR 544). Known as Old Lucerne Park Road, it runs parallel to SR 544 and leads to some residential areas between Lake Haines and Lake Henry.
- The easternmost segment, known as Lake Marion Road, picks up where SR 544 leaves off in Haines City and runs east from SR 17 toward Grenelefe, ending at Lake Marion.

=== County Road 544A ===
County Road 544A
- Location: Auburndale

County Road 544A (CR 544A), called Derby Avenue, serves as a sort of extension of SR 544 to the west. Its western terminus is Recker Highway (SR 655) in western Auburndale; it then runs parallel to US 92 until reaching SR 544 just east of its junction with US 92.
