= Polk City, Florida =

- City
- City of Polk City
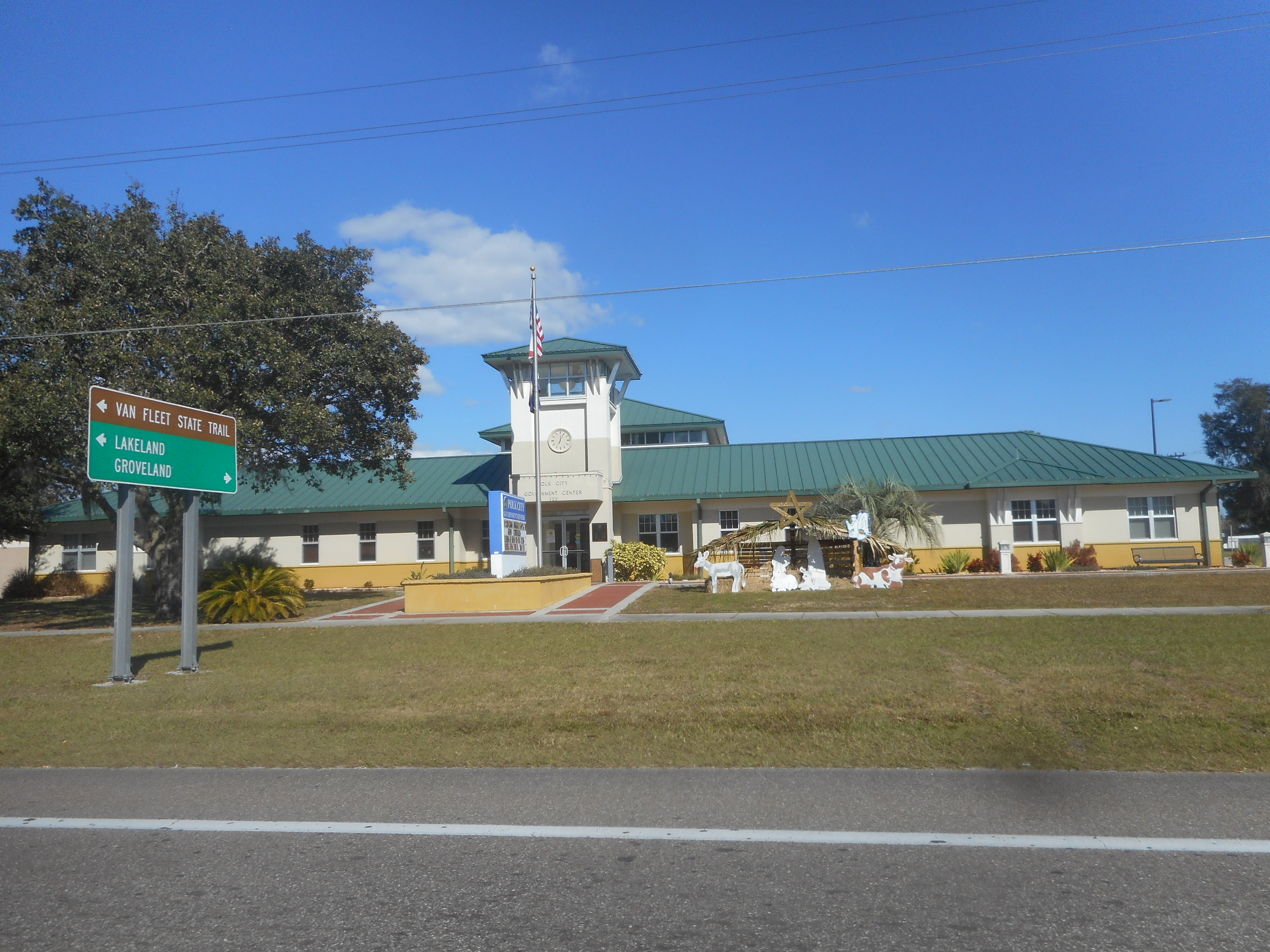
- Polk City Government Center as seen from Florida State Road 559

- Seal
- Mottoes: "Peace & Serenity" "Building Today For A Better Today"
- Location in Polk County and the state of Florida
- Coordinates: 28°10′49″N 81°49′47″W
- Country: United States
- State: Florida
- County: Polk
- Settled: c. 1800s
- Incorporated (Town): April 3, 1925
- Incorporated (City): 2005
- Named after: James Knox Polk

Government
  - Type: Commission-Manager
  - Mayor: Joe LaCascia
  - Vice Mayor: Brian Knouff
  - Commissioners: Rick Wilson, Donna Martin, and Micheal T. Blethen
  - City Manager: Patricia Jackson
  - City Attorney: Thomas A. Cloud

Area
  - Total: 5.08 sq mi (13.17 km^{2})
  - Land: 4.51 sq mi (11.67 km^{2})
  - Water: 0.58 sq mi (1.50 km^{2})
- Elevation: 148 ft (45 m)

Population (2020)
  - Total: 2,713
  - Density: 602.3/sq mi (232.54/km^{2})
- Time zone: UTC-5 (Eastern (EST))
  - Summer (DST): UTC-4 (EDT)
- ZIP code: 33868
- Area code: 863
- FIPS code: 12-57950
- GNIS feature ID: 2407139
- Website: www.mypolkcity.org

Polk City is a city in Polk County, Florida, United States. It is part of the Lakeland–Winter Haven metropolitan statistical area. Its population was 2,713 at the 2020 census.

== History ==
The community has been settled since the 1800s by farmers, starting off as farmland. Polk City was incorporated as the "Town of Polk City" on April 3, 1925, and changed by ordinance to the City of Polk City in 2005. The city was named after the county itself, which was named after James Knox Polk, the 11th President of the United States.

== Geography ==
According to the United States Census Bureau, the city has a total area of 0.8 square miles (2.1 km^{2}), all land. Polk City is located within the Central Florida Highlands area of the Atlantic coastal plain, with a terrain consisting of flatland interspersed with gently rolling hills.

=== Climate ===
The climate for the City of Polk City is characterized by hot, humid summers and generally mild to cool winters. According to the Köppen climate classification, Polk City has a humid subtropical climate zone, Cfa on climate maps.

== Demographics ==
Historical population
Census	Pop.	Note	%±
1930	222		—
1940	195		−12.2%
1950	171		−12.3%
1960	203		18.7%
1970	151		−25.6%
1980	576		281.5%
1990	1,439		149.8%
2000	1,516		5.4%
2010	1,562		3.0%
2020	2,713		73.7%
U.S. Decennial Census

=== 2010 and 2020 census ===
Polk City racial composition (Hispanics excluded from racial categories) (NH = Non-Hispanic)
Race	Pop 2010	Pop 2020	% 2010	% 2020
White (NH)	1,323	1,711	84.70%	63.07%
Black or African American (NH)	14	103	0.90%	3.80%
Native American or Alaska Native (NH)	3	10	0.19%	0.37%
Asian (NH)	9	42	0.58%	1.55%
Pacific Islander or Native Hawaiian (NH)	0	0	0.00%	0.00%
Some other race (NH)	0	16	0.00%	0.59%
Two or more races/multiracial (NH)	24	96	1.54%	3.54%
Hispanic or Latino (any race)	189	735	12.10%	27.09%
Total	1,562	2,713		

As of the 2020 United States census, 2,713 people, 945 households, and 661 families were residing in the city.

As of the 2010 United States census, 1,562 people, 659 households, and 456 families livedin the city.

=== 2000 census ===
As of the census of 2000, 1,516 people, 542 households, and 422 families resided in the town. The population density was 1,966.2 inhabitants per square mile (759.2/km^{2}). The 596 housing units had an average density of 773.0 units per square mile (298.5 units/km^{2}). The racial makeup of the town was 94.13% White, 1.91% African American, 0.33% Native American, 0.40% Asian, 1.78% from other races, and 1.45% from two or more races. Hispanics or Latinos of any race were 8.11% of the population.

In 2000, of the 542 households, 39.1% had children under 18 living with them, 55.4% were married couples living together, 14.9% had a female householder with no husband present, and 22.0% were not families. About 17.2% of all households were made up of individuals, and 5.2% had someone living alone who was 65 or older. The average household size was 2.80 and the average family size was 3.07.

In 2000, the age distribution was 29.8% under 18, 7.4% from 18 to 24, 32.4% from 25 to 44, 19.9% from 45 to 64, and 10.6% who were 65 or older. The median age was 34 years. For every 100 females, there were 97.4 males. For every 100 females 18 and over, there were 95.6 males.

In 2000, the median income for a household in the town was $32,083, and for a family was $36,705. Males had a median income of $28,158 versus $20,579 for females. The per capita income for the town was $14,108. About 13.6% of families and 13.4% of the population were below the poverty line, including 11.2% of those under 18 and 5.7% of those 65 or over.

== Arts and culture ==
=== Annual cultural events ===
A yearly Founder's Day festival is held in midtown park located at the beginning of General James A. Van Fleet State Trail.

=== Museums and other points of interest ===
Fantasy of Flight, an aviation-related attraction, takes visitors back to the pioneering days of early flight, World War I, World War II, and beyond. The museum closed in April 2014, but was planned to reopen later in a downscaled form. Polk City Community Library, a public library, is a member of the Polk County Library Cooperative. It provides free computer use and interlibrary loan services. The library is located at 215 S. Bougainvillea Avenue.

== Sports ==
While small in both size and population, Polk City offers its residents a vast array of activities throughout the year. Children are offered tee-ball and little league baseball, and pee wee football.

== Government ==
Polk City has a council-manager form of government, and is governed by a five-person council that elects a mayor and vice mayor from its membership.

=== Utilities ===
The Polk City power grid is supported by distribution lines from Lakeland Electric and TECO.

== Infrastructure ==
=== Transportation ===
- I-4 – Located just south of the city, it is a major highway in Central Florida, leading westward to Lakeland and Tampa and eastward to Orlando.
- SR 33 – Called Commonwealth Avenue, this road leads south to Lakeland and north across the Green Swamp, toward Groveland.
- SR 559 – This road leads south to I-4 and Auburndale.
