= List of crossings of the St. Johns River =

This is a list of bridges and other crossings of the Saint Johns River.

== Crossings ==
Crossing	Carries	Miles to ICW	Image	Location	Coordinates
=== Florida ===
Mayport Ferry	SR A1A	2.5		Mayport	30°23′43.3″N 81°26′0.88″W
Dames Point Bridge	I-295	5.7		Jacksonville	30°23′4.65″N 81°33′25.13″W
Mathews Bridge	US 90 Alt. / SR 115 (Arlington Expressway)	16.1		Jacksonville	30°19′37.98″N 81°37′18.07″W
Hart Bridge	US 1 Alt.	17.3		Jacksonville	30°18′55.72″N 81°37′39.48″W
Main Street Bridge	US 1 / US 90	18.4		Jacksonville	30°19′21.34″N 81°39′30.86″W
Acosta Bridge	SR 13; JTA Skyway	19.6		Jacksonville	30°19′18.76″N 81°39′51.34″W
Strauss Trunnion Bridge	Florida East Coast Railway	19.6		Jacksonville	30°19′18.63″N 81°39′53.98″W
Fuller Warren Bridge	I-95	19.9		Jacksonville	30°18′55.48″N 81°40′19.54″W
Buckman Bridge	I-295	28.8		Orange Park	30°11′23.93″N 81°40′2.44″W
Shands Bridge	SR 16	46.0		Green Cove Springs	29°59′8.06″N 81°37′1.65″W
Memorial Bridge	US 17 / SR 100	73.6		Palatka to East Palatka	29°38′45.31″N 81°37′22.25″W
CSX Rail bridge	Sanford Subdivision	84.3		Buffalo Bluff	29°35′33″N 81°40′51″W
Fort Gates Ferry	Fort Gates Ferry Road			Salt Springs to Welaka	29°26′0″N 81°39′50″W
Drayton Island Ferry	Drayton Island Road			Georgetown to Drayton Island (partial crossing)	29°23′09″N 81°38′17″W
Astor Bridge	SR 40	120.6		Astor to Volusia	29°10′03″N 81°31′23″W
Francis P. Whitehair Bridge	SR 44	137.8		Crows Bluff to DeLand	29°00′31″N 81°22′56″W
CSX Rail bridge	Central Florida Commuter Rail			DeBary to Sanford	28°50′16″N 81°19′29″W
Benedict Bridge	US 17 / US 92	156.4		DeBary to Sanford	28°50′15″N 81°19′26″W
Lake Monroe Bridge(Closed)	Formerly US 17 / US 92			DeBary to Sanford	28°50′13″N 81°19′27″W
Veterans Memorial Bridge	I-4	156.7		DeBary to Sanford	28°50′09″N 81°19′09″W
Douglas Stenstrom Bridge	SR 415			Sanford to Osteen	28°48′09″N 81°12′37″W
Mims Bridge	SR 46			Seminole County to Volusia County	28°42′50″N 81°02′00″W
	SR 50			Orange County to Brevard County	28°32′34″N 80°56′35″W
Beachline Expressway Bridge	SR 528			Orange County to Brevard County	28°27′10.25″N 80°53′49.62″W
Rail Bridge	Brightline extension to Orlando, Florida			Orange County to Brevard County	28°27′09.4″N 80°53′49.7″W
	SR 520			Orange County to Brevard County	28°22′10.25″N 80°52′22.10″W
Space Coast Parkway	US 192				28°5′6.06″N 80°45′5.98″W
Rail Bridge (Abandoned)	Union Cypress Railroad			Alpha to Agnes	

== See also ==
- List of crossings of the Aucilla River
- List of crossings of the Halifax River
- List of crossings of the Ochlockonee River
- List of crossings of the Suwannee River
