= Timuquana Bridge =

Bridge in Florida, United States of America

The Timuquana Bridge was a proposed bridge over the St. Johns River in Jacksonville, Florida that was never built. The bridge was planned to connect with State Road 134 (103rd Street/Timuquana Road) on the west shore of the St. Johns with State Road 202 (Butler Boulevard) on the east shore.

The Timuquana was proposed because there is no other bridge crossing the eight-mile stretch of the St. Johns River between the Buckman Bridge and the Fuller Warren Bridge, and residents of Westside wanting to go to the Southside need to travel many miles out of their way to cross the river. However, construction of the Timuquana would require the destruction of a great many houses on both sides of the river, including homes in the Venetia neighborhood which some very exclusive neighborhoods along the west bank of the St. Johns. Accordingly, there was little to no political support for the idea from the start. The bridge would have also been built far too close to the Jacksonville Naval Air Station.

On the east bank of the river, the bridge would have run above the San Jose neighborhood as well as the Florida East Coast Railroad Bowden Yard, before terminating at the intersection of US 1 and SR 202.

Today the name Timuquana Bridge is used for a four-lane bridge crossing over the Ortega River, carrying FL-134 west of the route's eastern terminus at US-17 (Roosevelt Boulevard). Simply explained, the bridge is 2.34 meters long and connects Westside Jacksonville and Cedar Hills to Orange Park/ Ortega on US-17.
