= Mug Race =

Sailing race in Florida, United States

- Sport: Sailing
- Founded: 1954
- Claim to fame: World's longest river race
- Website: rudderclub.com

The Mug Race is an annual sailing race held on St. Johns River in the US state of Florida. Billed as the "World's Longest River Race", the course starts in Palatka and ends in Jacksonville. To compete, masts must be under 44 feet in order to clear all bridges along the course. The Mug Cup is awarded to the first boat to complete the 38.5 mile course from the starting line at Memorial Bridge to the finish line at Buckman Bridge. Additionally, there are over 100 class specific trophies

== Mug Cup winners ==
Year	Home town	Captain	Model
1954	(United States) Jacksonville, Florida	Al Holt	Cat Scow
1955	(United States) Charleston, South Carolina	George Lockwood	50 ft sloop
1956	(United States)	Jim Vanvoast	Flying Dutchman
1957	(United States) Palatka, Florida	Gene O'Connor	Raven
1958	(United States)	Jim Vanvoast	Flying Dutchman
1959	(United States)	Oscar Hubbert	C Scow
1960	(United States) Columbia, South Carolina	George Walters	
1961	(United States) Titusville, Florida	Hugh McClain	
1962	(United States) Jacksonville, Florida	Herb Elphick	Catamaran
1963	(United States)	William Miller	
1964	(United States) Cocoa Beach, Florida	Luc Martin	Shark
1965	(United States)	Charles Holt	
1966	(United States) Orlando, Florida	Al Nikolaien	Helcat 25
1967	(United States)	Harold Balcom	Helcat 25
1968	(United States) Merritt Island, Florida	David Carey	Tornado
1969	(United States) Cocoa Beach, Florida	Russ Gregory	Tornado
1970	(United States) Cocoa Beach, Florida	Russ Gregory	Tornado
1971	(United States) Orlando, Florida	Jim McCann	Tornado
1972	(United States) Cocoa Beach, Florida	Russ Gregory	Tornado
1973	(United States) Orlando, Florida	Jim McCann	Tornado
1974	(United States) Orlando, Florida	Jim McCann	Tornado
1975	(United States) Orlando, Florida	Jim McCann	Tornado
1976	(United States) Miami, Florida	Chris Christensen	Nacra 5.2
1977	(United States) W. Palm Beach, Florida	Chuck Cairnes	Tornado
1978	(United States) W. Palm Beach, Florida	Chuck Cairnes	Tornado
1979	(United States) Jacksonville, Florida	Mike Walsh	Hobie 18
1980	(United States) Boca Raton, Florida	Eric Arens	18 Square
1981	(United States) W. Palm Beach, Florida	Bill Roberts	Supercat 20
1982	(United States) Boca Raton, Florida	Eric Arens	18 Square
1983	(United States) W. Palm Beach, Florida	Bill Roberts	Supercat 20
1984	(United States) W. Palm Beach, Florida	Bill Roberts	RC 27
1985	(United States) W. Palm Beach, Florida	Bill Roberts	RC 27
1986	(United States) Jupiter Beach, Florida	Bill Roberts	RC 27
1887	(United States) Jupiter Beach, Florida	Bill Roberts	RC 27
1988	(United States) Jupiter Beach, Florida	Bill Roberts	RC 27
1989	(United States) Jupiter Beach, Florida	Bill Roberts	RC 27
1990	(United States) Fort Walton Beach, Florida	Randy Smyth	NACRA 6.0
1991	(United States) Jupiter Beach, Florida	Bill Roberts	RC 27
1992	Montreal, Canada	Philip James	Mystere 6.0
1993	(United States) Jupiter Beach, Florida	Bill Roberts	RC 27
1994	(United States) Jupiter Beach, Florida	Bill Roberts	RC 27
1995	(United States) Jupiter Beach, Florida	Bill Roberts	RC 27
1996	(United States) Flowery Branch, Georgia	Doug Harkrider	Supercat 22
1997	(United States) Flowery Branch, Georgia	Doug Harkrider	Supercat 22
1998	(United States) Flowery Branch, Georgia	Doug Harkrider	Supercat 22
1999	(United States) Jupiter, Florida	Eric Roberts	RC30
2000	(United States) Orlando, Florida	Lloyd Beery	Supercat 22
2001	(United States) Miami, Florida	Clive Mayo	Hobie 21
2002	(United States) Jupiter, Florida	Eric Roberts	RC30
2003	(United States) Orlando, Florida	Lloyd Beery	Supercat 22
2004	(United States) Jupiter, Florida	Eric Roberts	RC30
2005	(United States) Jacksonville, Florida	Mike Tierney	RC27
2006	(United States) Jacksonville, Florida	Robert Lyman	RC27
2007	(United States) Jupiter, Florida	Eric Roberts	RC30
2008	(United States) Jupiter, Florida	Eric Roberts	RC30
2009	(United States) Charleston, South Carolina	Robby Wilkins	E-scow
2010	(United States) Jupiter Beach, Florida	Eric Roberts	RC30
2011	(United States) Jupiter Beach, Florida	Eric Roberts	RC30
2012	(United States) Jupiter Beach, Florida	Eric Roberts	RC30
2013	Napier, New Zealand	Paul Scoffin	Flying Dutchman
2014	(United States) Jacksonville, Florida	Chris Cordes	A-Cat
2015	(United States) Jupiter Beach, Florida	Eric Roberts	RC30
2016	(United States) Jupiter Beach, Florida	Eric Roberts	RC30
2017	(United States) Jacksonville, Florida	Rich Brew	RC27
2018	(United States) Miami, Florida	Ralph Cole	F20 Carbon
2019	(United States) Tequesta, Florida	Eric Roberts	RC30
