= Virginia Village =

Virginia Village may refer to:

- Virginia Village, Denver, a neighborhood of Denver, Colorado
- Virginia Village, Florida, a community in Clay County, Florida
