= Lake Woodruff National Wildlife Refuge =

United States National Wildlife Refuge in Florida

- IUCN category IV (habitat/species management area)
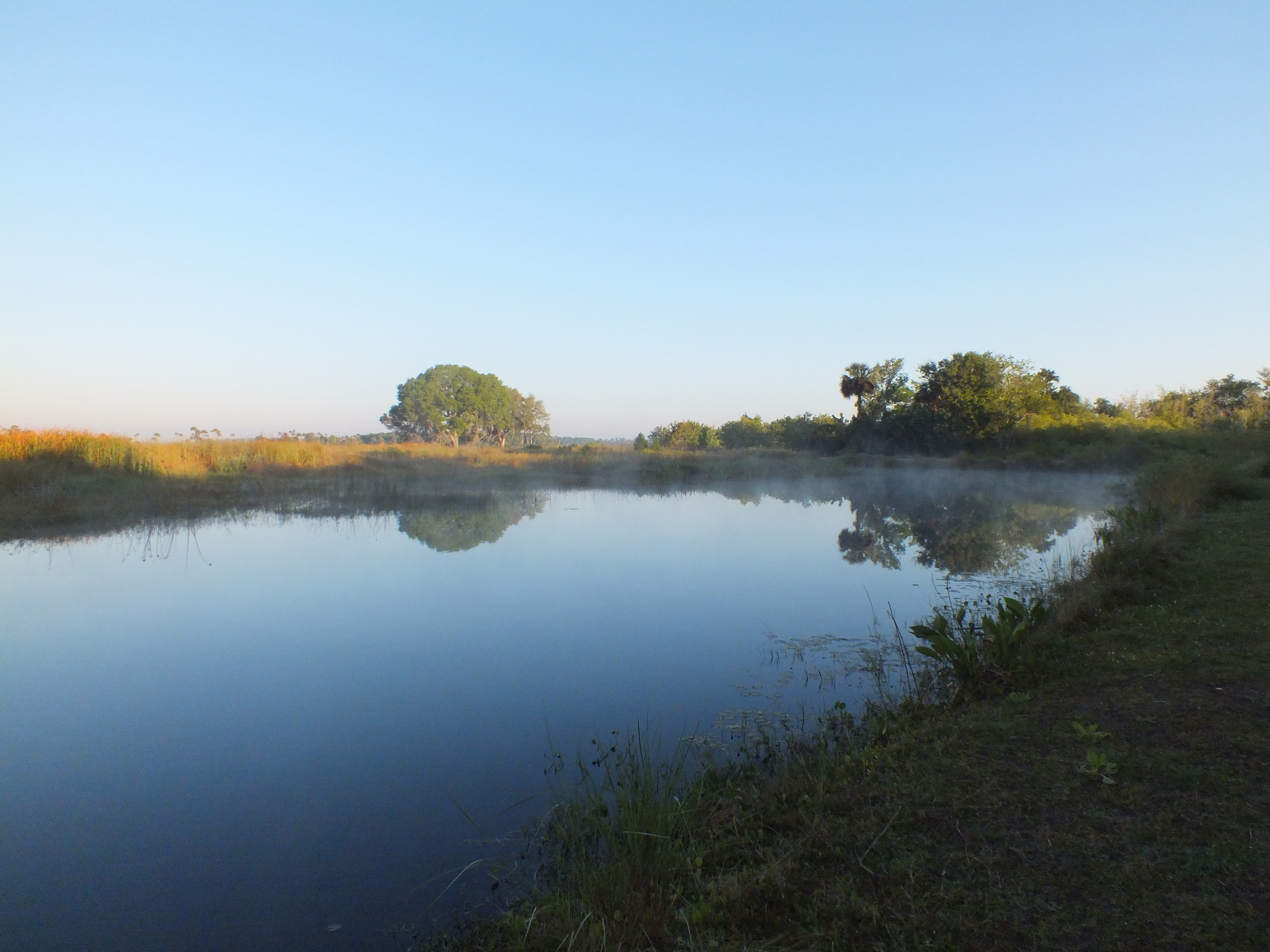
- Early-morning scenery at the refuge

- Location within the United States
- Location: Volusia / Lake counties, Florida, United States
- Nearest city: DeLeon Springs, Florida
- Coordinates: 29°05′N 81°26′W
- Area: 21,574 acres (8,731 ha)
- Established: 1964
- Governing body: US Fish & Wildlife Service
- Website: Lake Woodruff National Wildlife Refuge

The Lake Woodruff National Wildlife Refuge is part of the United States National Wildlife Refuge System, located in north central Florida, twenty-five miles west of Daytona Beach, off U.S. Highway 17 in DeLeon Springs.

== Description ==
The refuge was opened in 1964 in order for both migrating and wintering birds to have habitats. In 1982, the Northern Prairie Wildlife Research Center reported that the refuge included 18,400 acres of water. The refuge currently has over 30,000 acres of water, which includes marshes and swamps. Activities for visitors include boating, hiking, and wildlife viewing. Bodies of water are managed so that only desired plants grow. Law enforcement officials are present in order to protect the animals and plants. Touring by boat is the only way to explore a large part of the refuge.

The Lake Woodruff Wilderness consists of 1,066 acres (4.31 km^{2}) or 4.9% of the Refuge's total area. Alligators, bald eagles, and limpkins are among the wildlife that can be found in the area. Deer hunting is allowed, but the hunting is managed.

== Development ==
When the land was bought in 1964, the management did not have the money to help the wildlife. They did not have much money left after paying salaries. With a large donation of money in 1979, the managers were able to start working on the important projects that they were unable to do before. It wasn't until 1979 that the number of fishermen, who had been few, tripled. Projects that were funded through the donation included regulating the amount of water, improving hiking trails, and doing more to protect the wildlife such as the bald eagles and ospreys.

== Wildlife ==
215 species of birds, including species that are threatened or endangered, can be found in the refuge. A 2011 article from the journal Southeastern Naturalist documented 22 species of amphibian and 50 species of reptiles that researchers found within the refuge. The report concluded that the refuge's census of species, will help people understand the changes in amount of species within the Florida ecosystem. Bodies of water are set aside for manatees to breed. The refuge's volunteers document the amount of wildlife and restore their habitats, according to current needs.

Many ducks over-winter in the refuge. A drought in 1988 affected the nests of ducks that migrate to the refuge. The extent of aquatic plants for ducks, at minimum, is 450 acres.

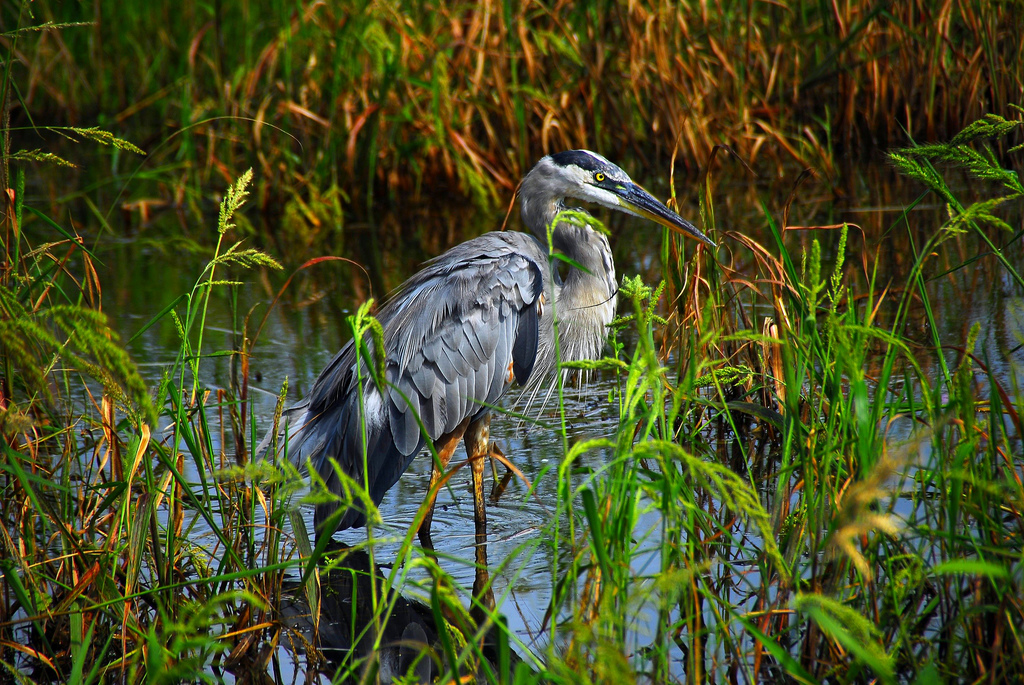
Great blue heron

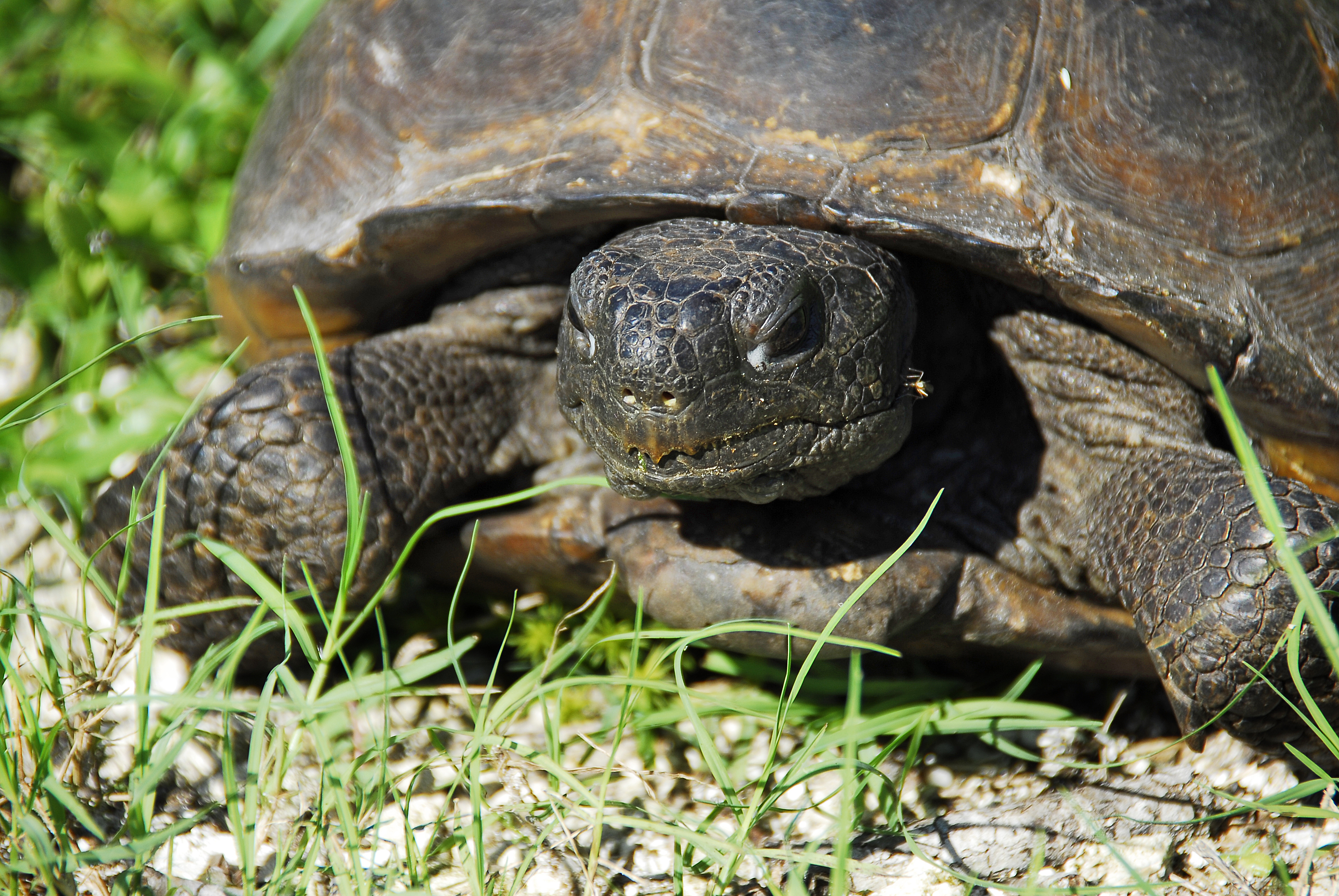
Gopher turtle (Gopherus polyphemus)

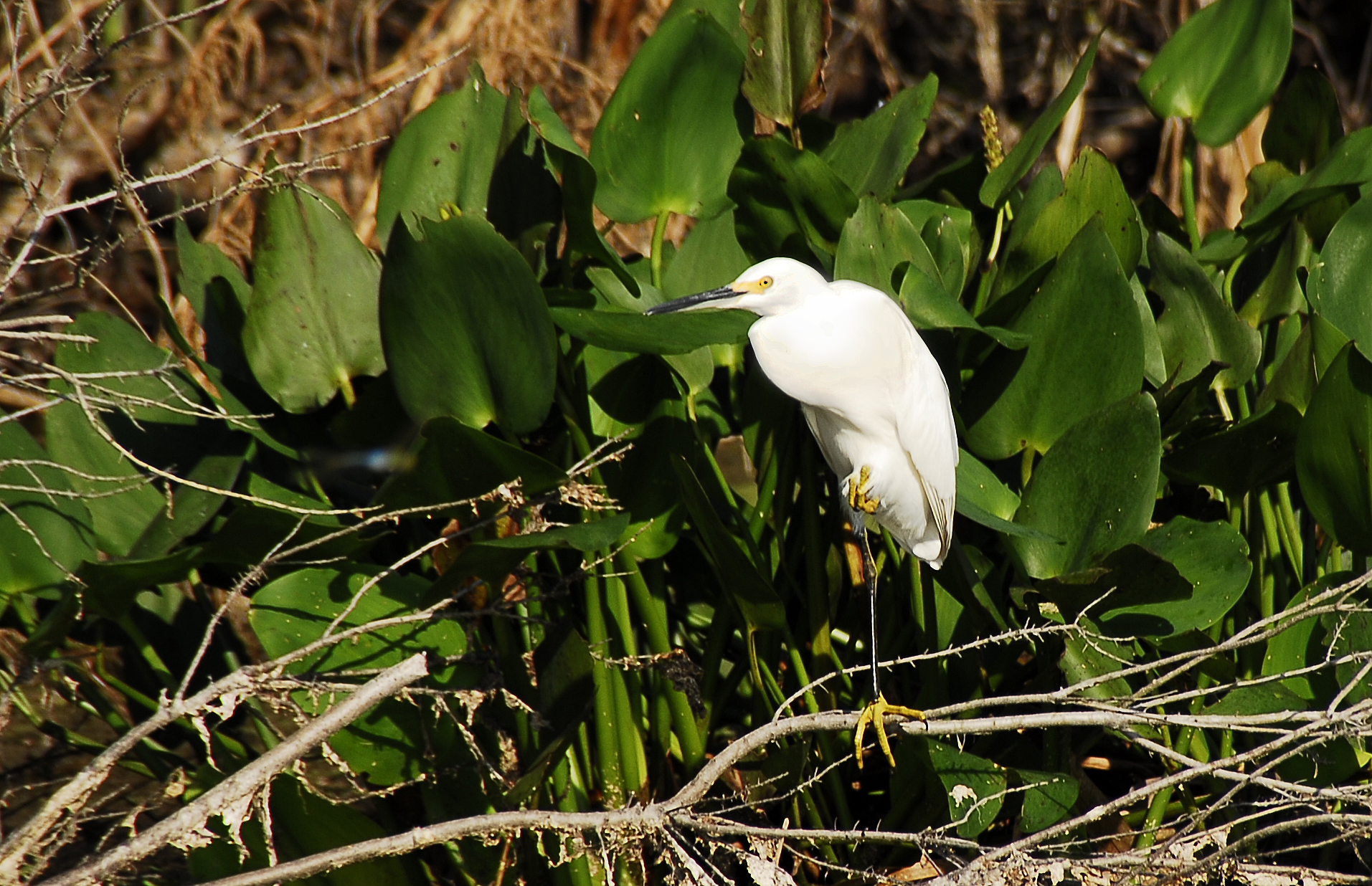
Snowy egret (Egretta thula)

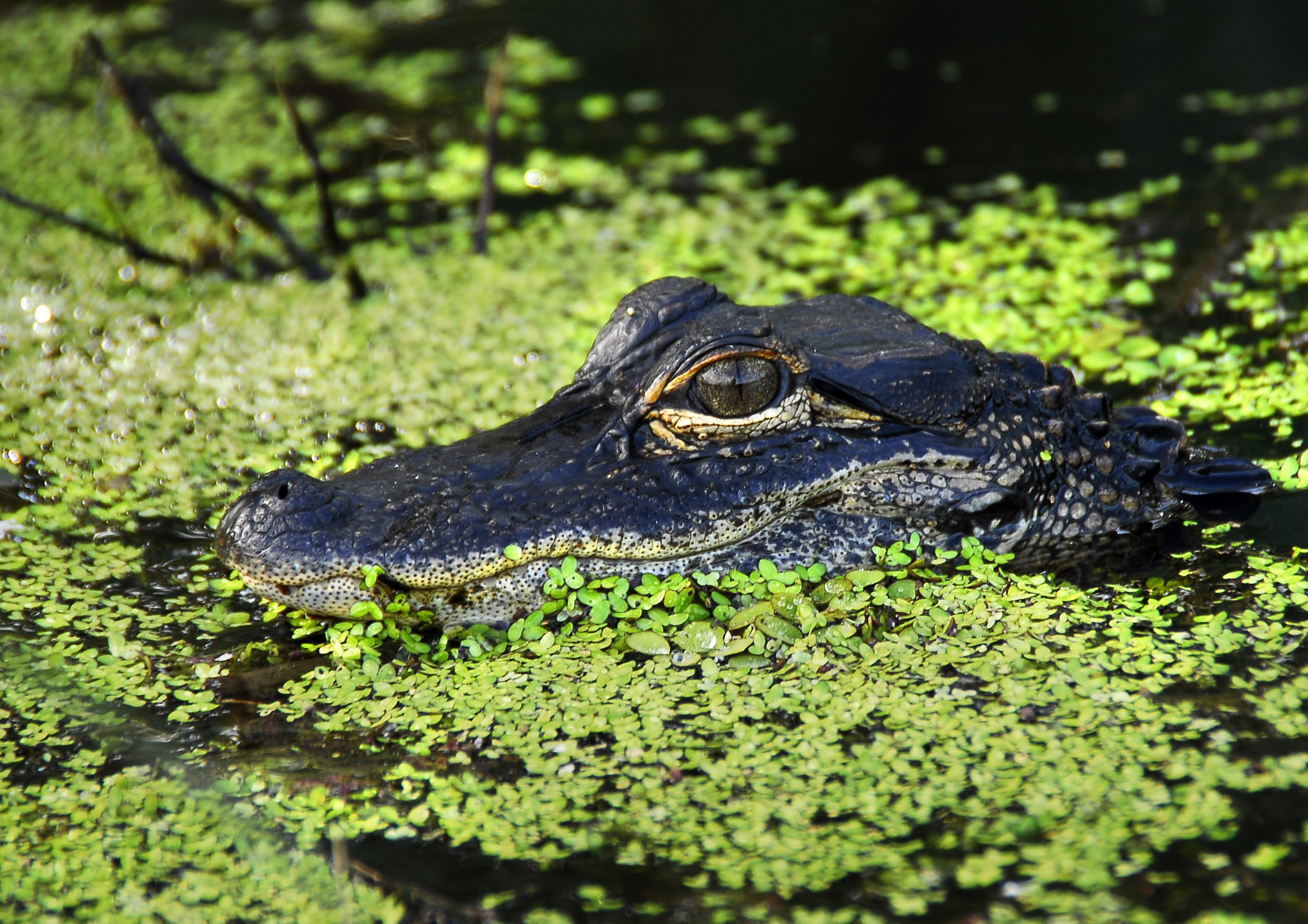
Young alligator at Audubon Lookout

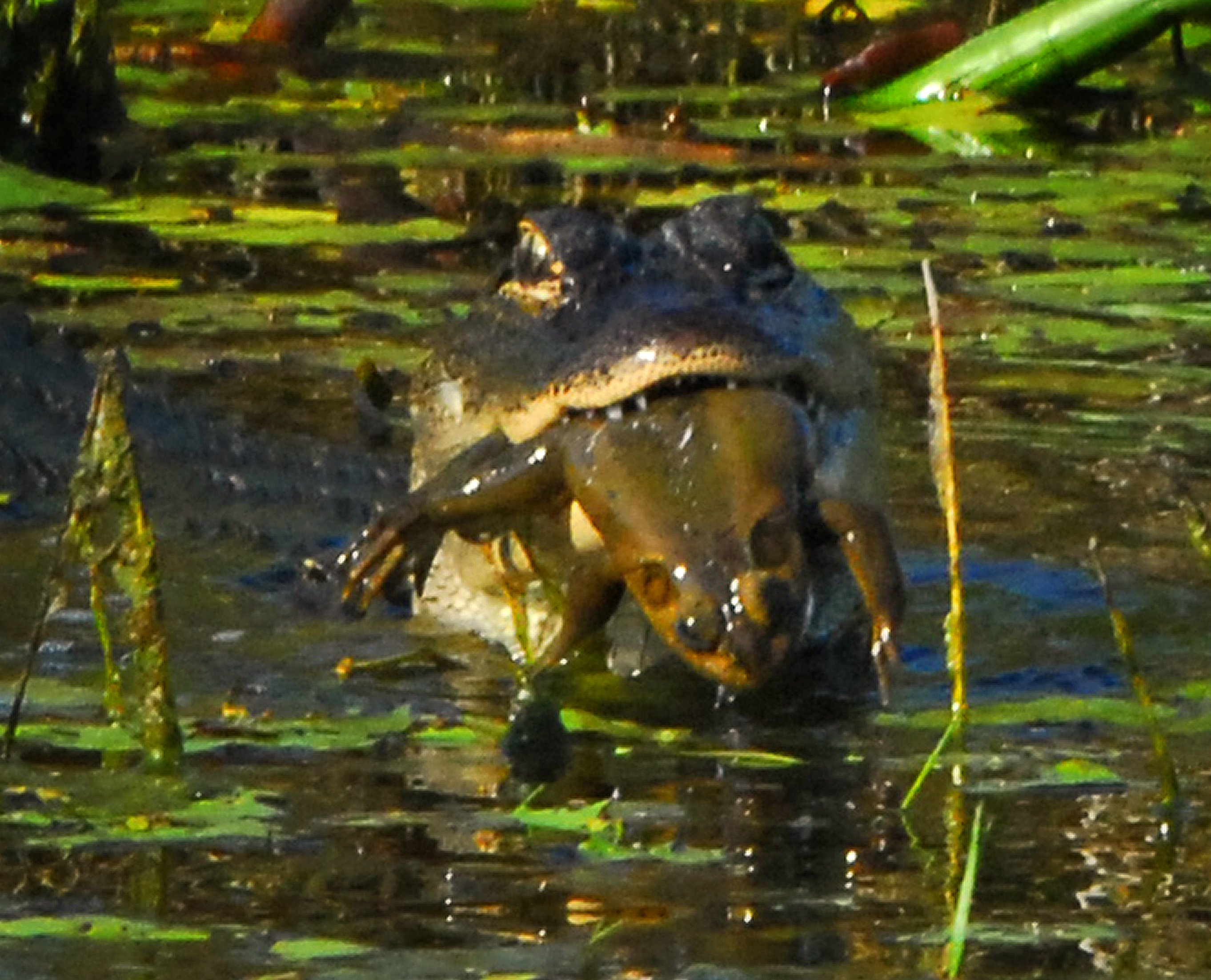
Young American Alligator preying on an American Bullfrog.
