= Becker, Florida =

Unincorporated community in Florida, U.S.

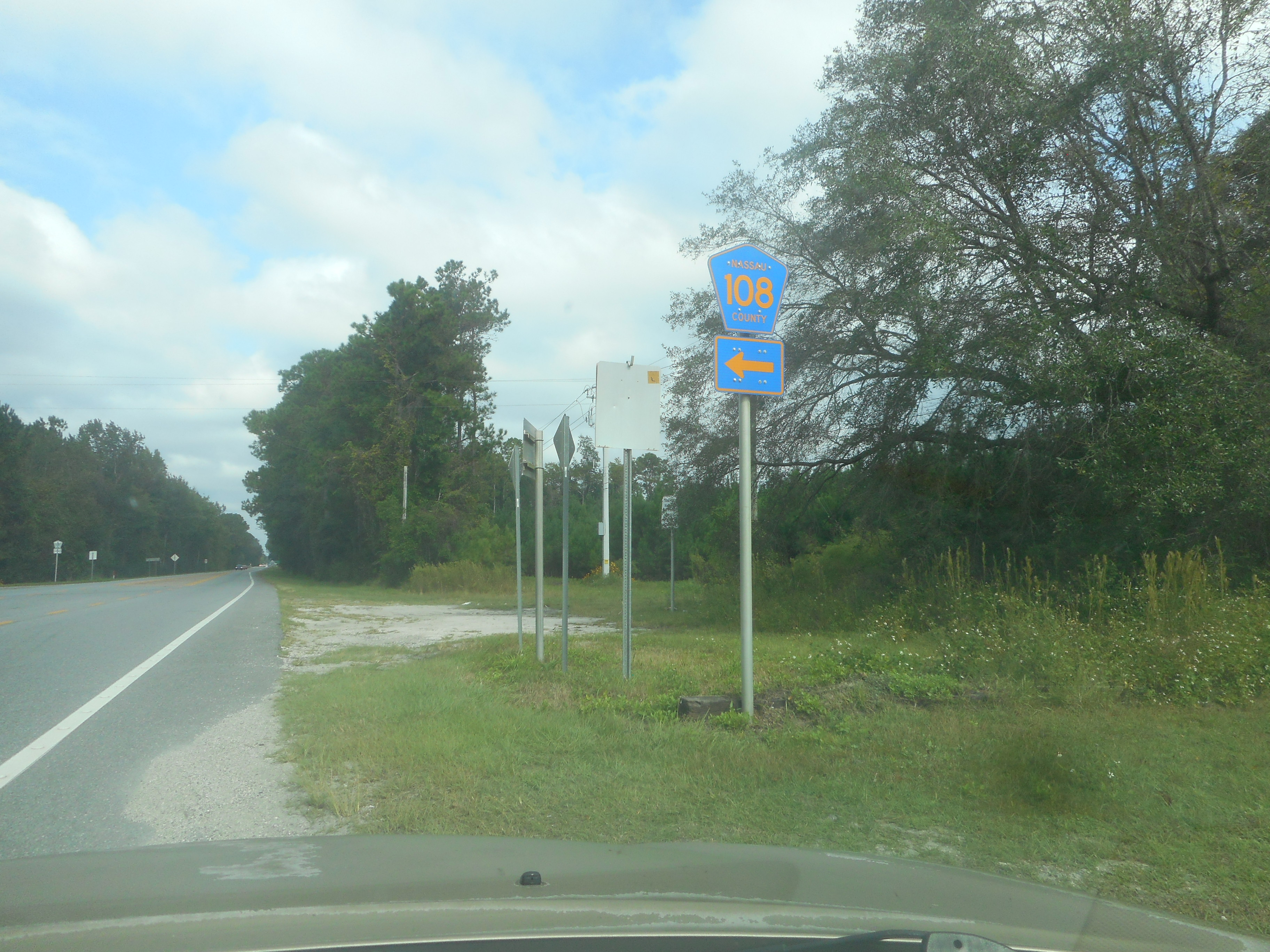
Northbound US 17 at the eastern terminus of County Road 108

Becker is an unincorporated community in Nassau County, Florida, United States. It is located on U.S. Route 17, north of Yulee in the north-central area of the county.

== Geography ==
Becker is located at 30°40′16″N 81°38′28″W. The nearest settlements to Becker are Gross to the northwest, Crandall, to the north-northeast, and Yulee to the south-southeast.
