= Satsuma, Florida =

- Unincorporated community
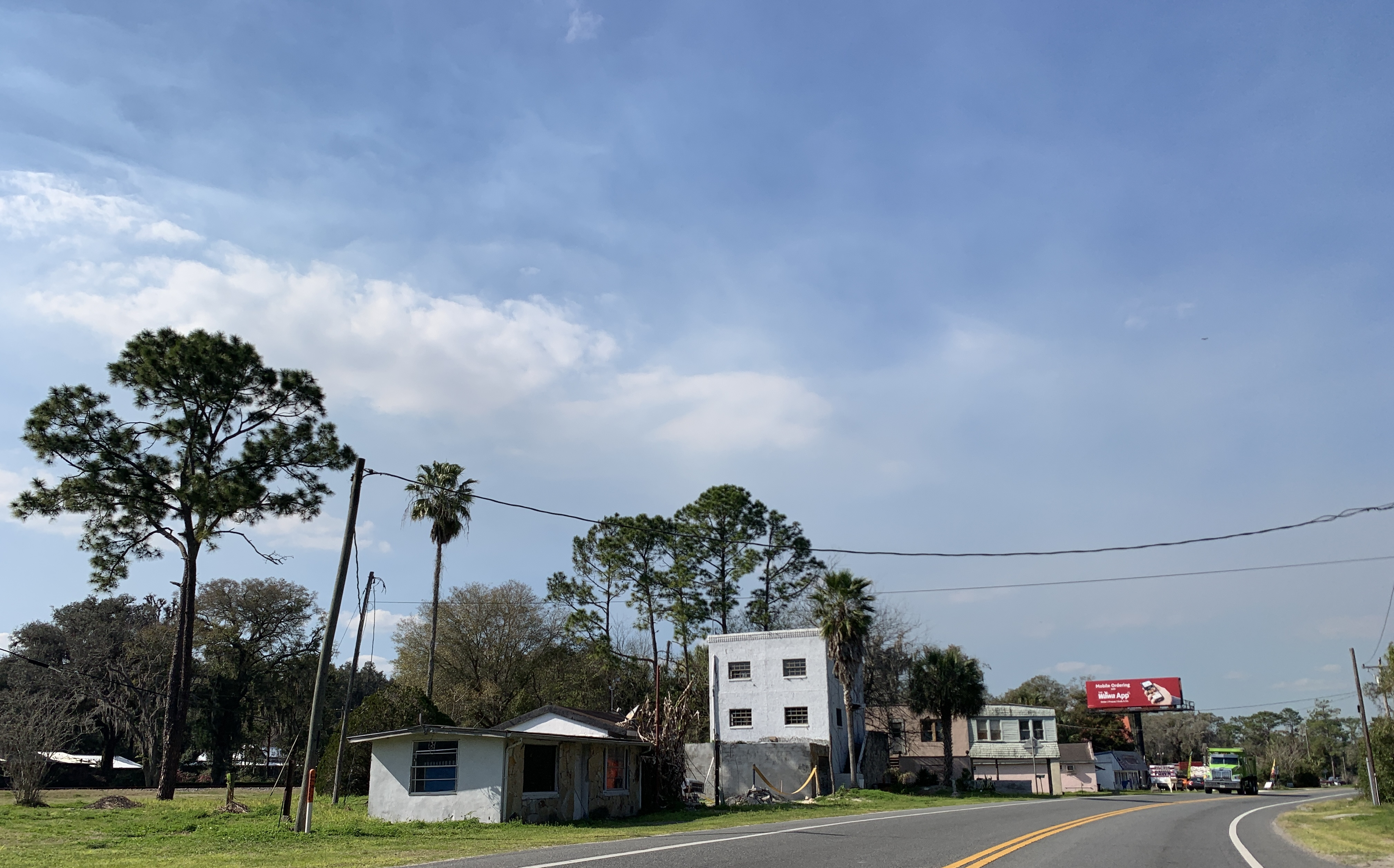

- Location within Florida
- Coordinates: 29°33′18″N 81°39′21″W
- Country: United States
- State: Florida
- County: Putnam
- Elevation: 69 ft (21 m)
- Time zone: UTC-5 (Eastern (EST))
  - Summer (DST): UTC-4 (EDT)
- ZIP code: 32189
- Area code: 386
- GNIS feature ID: 290695

Satsuma is an unincorporated community in Putnam County, Florida, United States. Its ZIP code is 32189, and the main road through the community is U.S. Route 17.

Satsuma is on Dunn's Creek which connects to 16,000 acre Crescent Lake and St. Johns River and is also the home of the Putnam County Speedway.
