= San Mateo, Florida =

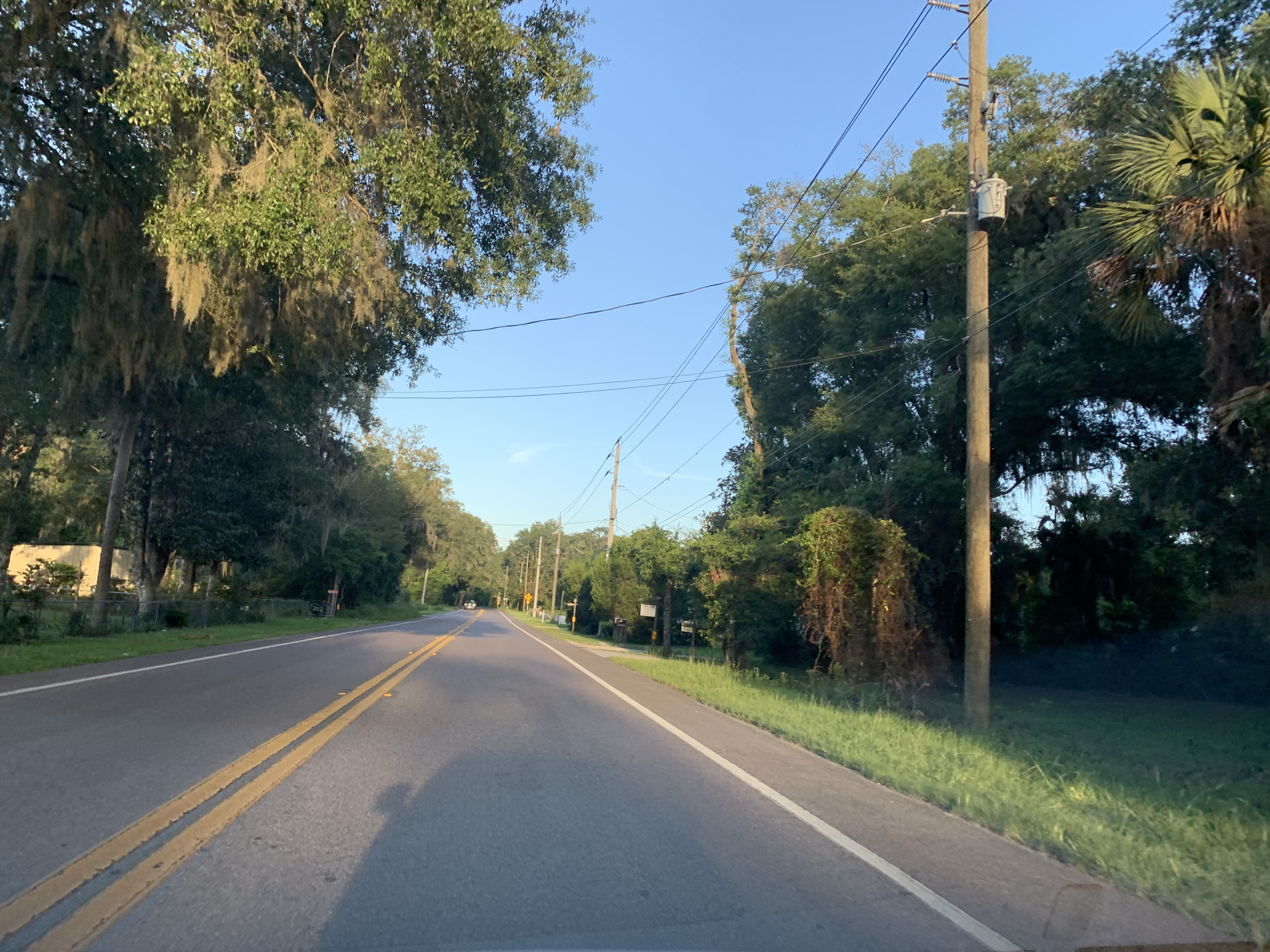
- San Mateo as seen from Highway 100.

- Location within Florida
- County: Putnam County
- Time zone: UTC-5 (EST)
  - Summer (DST): UTC-4 (EDT)
- ZIP code: 32187
- Area code: 386

San Mateo is an unincorporated community in Putnam County, Florida, United States, located just southeast of the city of Palatka. It is on the east shore of the St. Johns River between buoys 12 and 15; stretching from Buzzard Island to the entrance to Dunn's Creek. The main road through San Mateo is US Route 17, with a southern terminus of the overlap with Florida State Roads 20 and 100.

== Geography ==
San Mateo is located at 29.607°N 81.585°W, with an elevation of 72 feet (22 m).
