= Andrews Causeway =

Highway in Orlando, Florida, United States

Coordinates: 28.5748°N 81.3645°W

Route information
- Existed: 1935–present

The Andrews Causeway is located in the city of Orlando, Florida. The highway was constructed in 1935 and divides Lake Estelle. It allows Mills Avenue to enter into Orlando from Winter Park, Florida to the north.

== Dedication ==
The Causeway was renamed by order of the 1949 State Legislature and was dedicated by President Truman.

On Tuesday, March 8, 1949, President Truman continued his trip from Key West to Orlando. As Lieut. Comdr. William M. Rigdon, United States Navy recorded in the President's log:

The motorcade was halted on North Mills Street, Orlando – at the causeway across Lake Estelle. The President, at 11:05 a.m., alighted from his car and was greeted by Mrs. Charles O. Andrews (widow of the former United States Senator) and Mr. Charles O. Andrews, Jr.

Mr. Andrews presented to the President approximately fifty guests who had been invited to witness the ceremony to be held at the causeway.

Mayor William Beardall, Jr. extended to the President the official greetings of his city. The President responded and, with a pair of scissors handed to him, cut the ribbon symbolizing the dedication of the causeway as the "Charles O. Andrews Causeway" honoring the memory of Senator Andrews. The President paid special tribute to Senator Andrews, referring to him as a great public servant and fine gentleman.
