= U.S. Route 17 in Florida =

Section of U.S. Highway in Florida, United States

U.S. Highway 17
- Coastal Highway
- US 17 highlighted in red

Route information
- Maintained by FDOT
- Length: 317.070 mi (510.275 km)

Major junctions
- South end: US 41 in Punta Gorda
- I-75 in Solana; SR 70 in Arcadia; SR 60 in Bartow; US 27 in Haines City; SR 50 in Orlando; I-4 in Orlando; SR 20 in Palatka; I-295 in Jacksonville; I-10 in Jacksonville; SR 200 / SR A1A in Yulee
- North end: US 17 / SR 25 south of St. Mary's, GA

Location
- Country: United States
- State: Florida
- Counties: Charlotte, DeSoto, Hardee, Polk, Osceola, Orange, Seminole, Volusia, Putnam, Clay, Duval, Nassau

Highway system
- United States Numbered Highway System; List; Special; Divided; Florida State Highway System; Interstate; US; State; Former; Pre‑1945; Toll; Scenic
| ← SR 16 | → SR 17 |
| ← SR 553 | SR 555 | → SR 559 |

U.S. Highway 17 (US 17) in Florida is a north–south United States Numbered Highway that runs 317 miles (510 km) from the Punta Gorda, Florida Metropolitan Statistical Area northeast to the Jacksonville metropolitan area.

As is the case with all Florida roads with American Association of State Highway and Transportation Officials (AASHTO) route numbers, the entirety of US 17 has a hidden Florida Department of Transportation (FDOT) designation:

- State Road 35 (SR 35) from the route's terminus at US 41 in Punta Gorda to East Main Street in Bartow.
- State Road 555 (SR 555) from East Main Street in Bartow to US 92/SR 600 in Lake Alfred.
- SR 600 from Lake Alfred to DeLand along the course of the route's cosigning with US 92.
- SR 15 from the intersection with SR 50 and US 17/US 92/SR 15 south in Orlando to the Martin Luther King Jr. Parkway interchange in Jacksonville.
- SR 5 from the Martin Luther King Jr. Parkway interchange in Jacksonville to the Georgia state line over the St. Marys River.

Concurrencies include US 98 between Fort Meade and Bartow, and a notably long one with US 92 between Lake Alfred and northern DeLand, which itself includes concurrencies with US 192 in Kissimmee, US 441 between Kissimmee and Orlando, SR 50 in Orlando, and SR 46 in Sanford. Others include SR 20/SR 100 between San Mateo and Palatka and Interstate 10 (I-10), I-95, US 23, and US 1 in Downtown Jacksonville in that order.

== Route description ==
=== Punta Gorda through Winter Haven ===
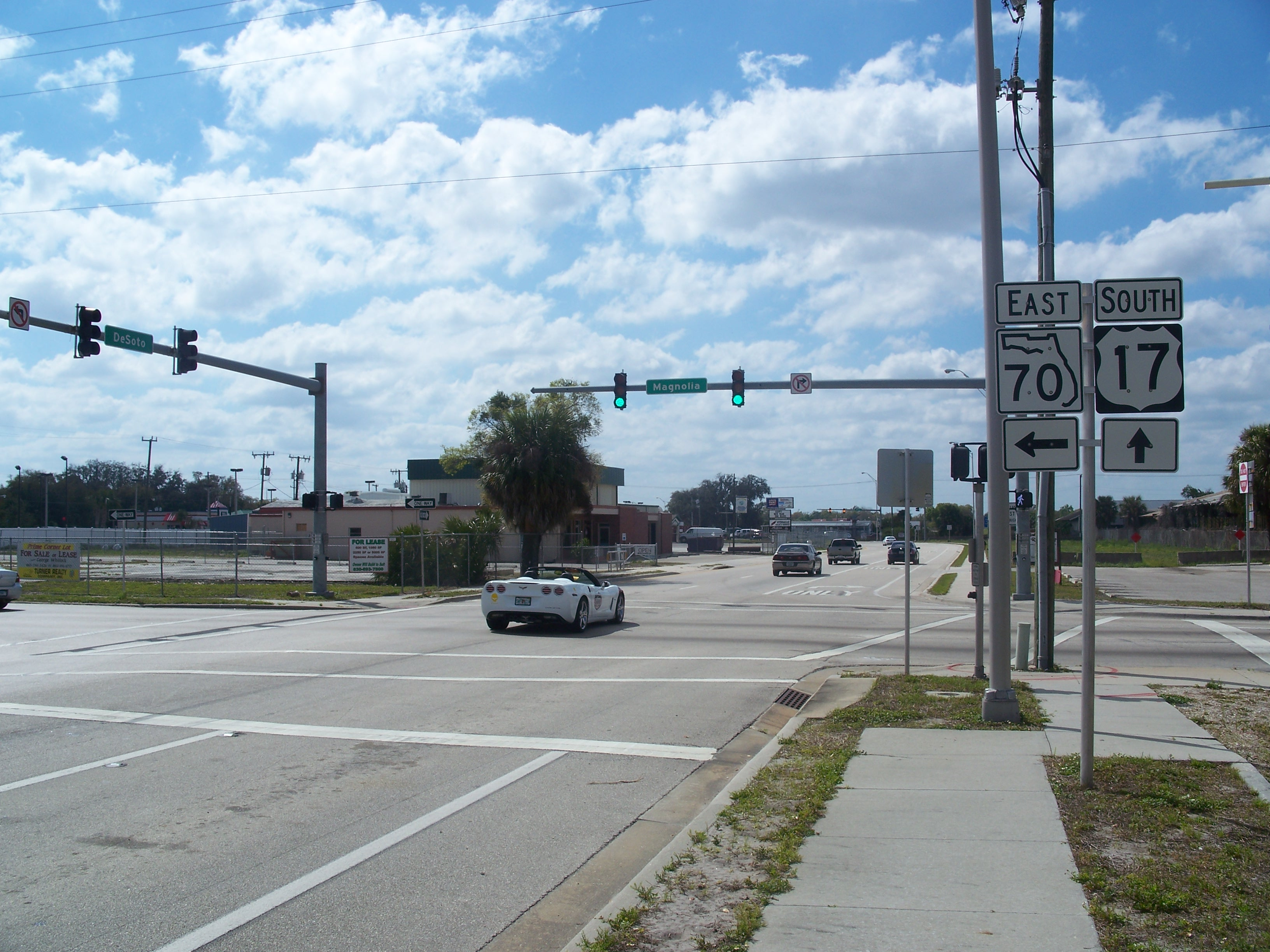
Intersection of US 17 and SR 70 in Arcadia

US 17 begins in downtown Punta Gorda at US 41 (Tamiami Trail). From here, it proceeds east as a pair of one-way streets along Marion and Olympia avenues. Once outside of the Punta Gorda city limits, the one-way streets rejoin each other becoming a six-lane highway. From here, it is briefly elevated over the Seminole Gulf Railway and city streets before intersecting with I-75 at exit 164 in Solana. After a brief jog east, it travels roughly northeast along the Peace River into DeSoto County, where it goes through Fort Ogden, Nocatee, and Arcadia. It splits into one-way streets again through Arcadia, where it intersects SR 70. Once out of Arcadia, it continues northeast into Hardee County. Here, it returns to a four lane divided highway with a 65-mile-per-hour (105 km/h) speed limit. It continues to the cities of Zolfo Springs (where it crosses the Peace River) and Wauchula. At Fort Meade, it joins with US 98, which follows it northward (westward on US 98) until Bartow. While US 98 goes northwest, US 17 goes northeast.

In the city of Bartow, US 17 is known as Spessard Holland Parkway, named after the 28th governor of Florida. Here, US 98 leaves to the west at a connecting road to SR 60, where hidden SR 35 breaks away from US 17 and SR 555 replaces it. From here, US 17/SR 555 makes a sharp northeast turn into Gordonville as it passes by Bartow Executive Airport. North of there, US 17 serves as the main road through Eagle Lake. After the intersection of Crystal Beach Road, the highway divides into a one-way couplet with three lanes in each direction, with the northbound section on 5th Street and the southbound segment on 4th Street. The two segments converge again south of Cameron Road (Gilbert Road) to become a six-lane divided highway. At the next major intersection, SR 540 (Old 9 Foot Road) joins US 17 and both roads continue north in a short concurrency. At Eloise, Old 9 Foot Road moves east onto County Road 655 (CR 655), which is the southern terminus of SR 655 (South Lake Shipp Road) on the west side. A left turn at this intersection and a right turn onto the parallel Seventh Street Southwest takes motorists to Winter Haven station. US 17/SR 540 goes over the Amtrak line between lakes Shipp and Lulu, both of which go over a canal running between the two lakes. The canal serves as the southern border of Winter Haven. Descending as it passes Chain of Lakes Park, SR 540 leaves US 17 at Cypress Gardens Boulevard to continue eastward, but this intersection is also for Southwest Avenue R, which also leads to Winter Haven station. Between Avenue G Southwest and Avenue C Southwest, US 17 curves to the left from Third Street and then to the right onto Sixth Street. From there, it intersects Central Avenue, which is SR 542 east of US 17. After winding around Spring Lake east of Lake Mirror, the road runs along the west side of Inman Park until it reaches the intersection with SR 544.

=== Concurrency with US 92 ===
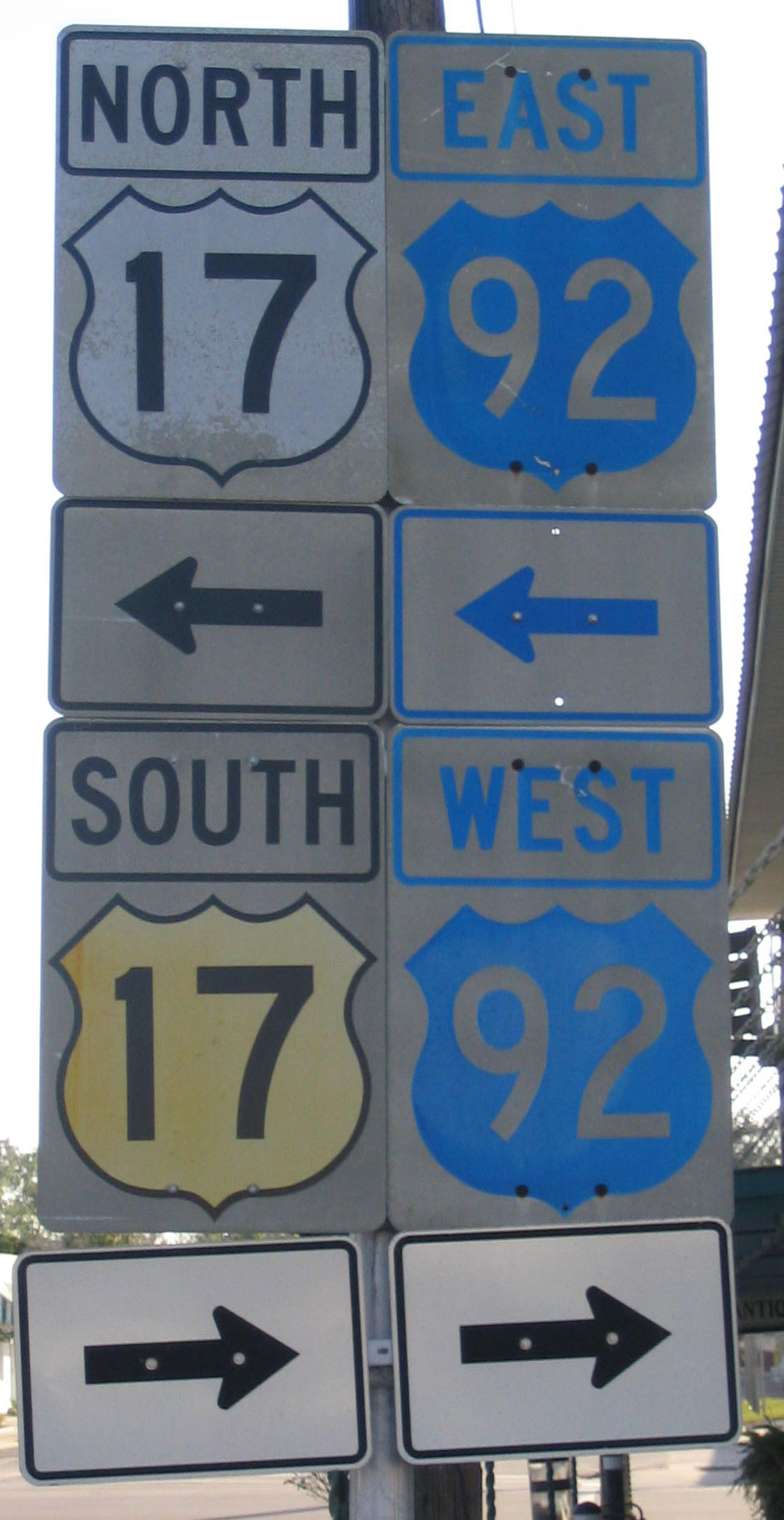
Older US 17/US 92 markers in Lake Alfred

US 17 and US 92 join at the south end of Lake Alfred in Polk County and thus the new hidden state road is SR 600 which carries US 92 west into Auburndale, Lakeland, Plant City, Tampa, and St. Petersburg. SR 555 soon splits off as CR 555 to the north along the old road through Lake Alfred, known as South Buena Vista Road while US 17/US 92 runs one block east on Lake Shore Way. Just south of East Thelma Street, US 17/US 92 splits onto two different roadways while CR 555 ends on the west side of the intersection. CR 557 begins at Haines Boulevard, where it heads west for a block to former CR 555, and then turns north toward I-4; just past CR 557, US 17/US 92 turns east toward Haines City. It enters downtown Haines City on Hinson Avenue after crossing under US 27 at a cloverleaf interchange, meeting the north end of SR 17. Right after crossing under a 14-foot-5-inch (4.39 m), narrow railroad bridge with arch-shaped pedestrian tunnels on both sides, it turns north onto 17th Street where it meets CR 580, which runs east to Poinciana. In Davenport, US 17 meets CR 547, which heads west to US 27 and north along old US 17/US 92. US 17 then intersects with Ronald Reagan Parkway (CR 54) at Loughman.

After crossing into Osceola County, US 17/US 92 picks up the Orange Blossom Trail (OBT) name. From here, US 17/US 92 roughly parallels I-4 along the overlap. OBT takes US 17 east and north through Kissimmee and into Orlando. The OBT name temporarily ends at Pleasant Hill Road (former SR 531) in southern Kissimmee, where it becomes John Young Parkway (formerly Bermuda Avenue) to Vine Street (US 192/SR 530). (US 17 ran through downtown Kissimmee on Emmett Street, Broadway, and Main Street until 1999.) It turns east there on US 192, while John Young Parkway becomes SR 423. When all three meet US 441 at Main Street, US 192 follows US 441 southbound, while US 17/US 92 follows US 441, as well as unsigned SR 500 and SR 600, north into Downtown Orlando, but not before becoming OBT again at the northern city limits.

Due to its proximity with Walt Disney World and affiliated resorts as well as SeaWorld Orlando, Universal Orlando, and others, US 17/US 92/US 441 intersects many toll roads between Kissimmee and Orlando, the first of which is the partially tolled and partial limited-access Osceola Parkway in Kissimmee. Immediately after this in Orlando is SR 417 (Central Florida GreeneWay) at exit 11. North of here, the Central Florida Parkway leads to SeaWorld Orlando. Neither of these intersections or interchanges, however, compare to the combined interchanges of Florida's Turnpike and SR 528 (Beachline Expressway), in Sky Lake, which contains a series of convoluted partial cloverleaf interchanges and partial ramps from side roads. North of this interchange, the road passes west of The Florida Mall and intersects SR 482.

The first interchange with I-4 is at exit 80 in Holden Heights. Eastbound access from I-4 comes from partial cloverleaf ramps, and westbound access comes from a left-turn ramp between the two carriageways that runs under the eastbound lane and merges with the east to southbound ramp before merging with southbound OBT. The interchange provides no south to east access and no west to north access, but such access can found from the intersection with West Michigan Street. Further north, the road heads into Orlando and comes to the interchange with SR 408 (East–West Tollway) at exit 9, which is a diamond interchange. After curving around Givens Street and Springdale Road, both of which can only be accessed from West Concord Street, OBT moves closer to a parallel railroad freight line and meets the intersection of SR 50 (Colonial Drive) northwest of downtown. At SR 50, US 17/US 92 turns east onto a new concurrency, taking hidden SR 600 with it, while US 441 continues northwest on OBT toward Apopka. US 17/US 92/SR 50 meets the south end of SR 424 (Edgewater Drive) and crosses under I-4 at a second interchange (exits 83A east and exit 84 west) and SR 527 (Orange Avenue southbound and Magnolia Avenue northbound) before meeting SR 15 (Mills Avenue), where US 17/US 92 turns north. Mills Avenue carries SR 15 on both sides of SR 50 but is only signed as such to the south, as, north of SR 50, it carries US 17/US 92 (and unsigned SR 600). It crosses Lake Estelle on the Andrews Causeway before reaching the border between Orlando and Winter Park.

In Seminole County, the redevelopment of the US 17/US 92 Community Redevelopment Area is handled by the US 17/US 92 Community Redevelopment Agency, a component unit of the county government. In Sanford, US 17/US 92 shares a concurrency with westbound SR 46 beginning at Paola Road (CR 46A) and 25th Street. During this triple-concurrency, US 17/US 92/SR 46 intersects an at-grade railroad crossing with a freight line at the intersection of West 13th Street, also the western terminus of CR 415, and then a pair of railroad crossings at a junction of two other freight lines. The routes turn left at the intersection of First Street, and the wrong-way concurrency between US 92 and SR 46 becomes more geographically accurate. Along this segment, US 17/US 92/SR 46 climbs a bridge over CSX Transportation's Sanford Subdivision which includes the Sanford Amtrak Auto Train on the southeast corner of that bridge, and Sanford station on the northwest corner. SR 46 leaves US 17/US 92 at the intersection of CR 15 (Upsala Road), while SR 46 continues west toward Mount Dora and US 17/US 92 continues north along Monroe Road. Just before the intersection with Orange Boulevard, and an at-grade crossing with the Sanford Subdivision, US 17/US 92 curves to the northeast as it approaches part of the interchange with I-4. Still within the vicinity of this interchange, the road turns left onto West Seminole Boulevard only to curve north where it crosses the St. Johns River into Volusia County via the Benedict Bridge, which replaced the Lake Monroe Bridge, running parallel to the very Interstate it had just passed under.

=== DeLand and points north ===
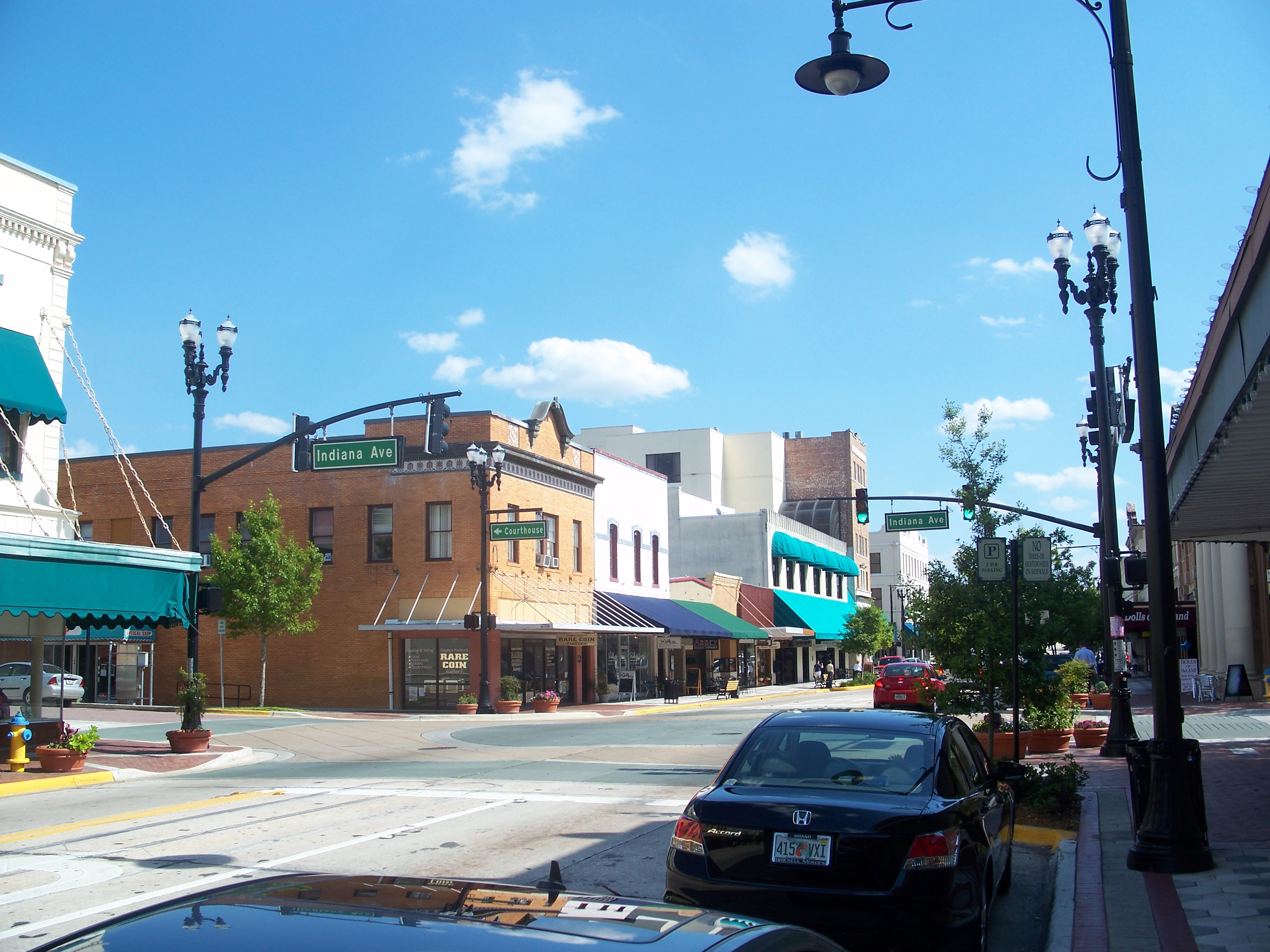
US 17 in downtown DeLand

In the city of DeLand, US 17/US 92 adopts the name Woodland Boulevard. At Howry Avenue, the road becomes the eastern border of the National Register of Historic Places-listed Downtown DeLand Historic District. Two blocks later, it intersects SR 44, which does not allow any turns—right or left—and so adjacent city streets are marked for those turns. Another two blocks north of this point, US 17/US 92 leaves the historic district at Rich Avenue, but then at Ohio Avenue enters another historic district for Stetson University. Further north, US 92 then splits away from US 17, with US 92 continuing east to Daytona Beach as International Speedway Boulevard, while US 17 continues north. That straight north directive ends at the intersection of SR 11, and US 17 curves to the northwest, where it serves as the termini of both SR 15A and its county extension CR 15A. Within DeLeon Springs, the road runs straight north again and serves as the southern terminus of CR 3, a scenic detour off US 17. Curving northwest again before the intersection of Spring Garden Ranch Road, US 17 approaches the vicinity of De Leon Springs State Park and begins to run parallel to CR 3 again, which it continues to do beyond the preserve, even as it enters Barberville and intersects SR 40. CR 3 finally terminates with US 17 in Connersville. Momentarily curving east in Satsuma, the road crosses one creek before entering San Mateo where it begins at yet another concurrency, in this case with SR 20/SR 100. All three roads enter Palatka, and, after the intersection with SR 207, US 17 again crosses the St. Johns River, along with SR 20/SR 100 on Memorial Bridge. From here, SR 20 breaks away onto South 9th Street and heads west toward Gainesville and the Florida Panhandle, and then US 17/SR 100 pass by historic Palatka station, originally known as the Old Atlantic Coast Line Union Depot, which now serves as the Palatka Railroad Preservation Society and the David Browning Railroad Museum, where it encounters a grade crossing. After US 17 curves northwest, SR 100 breaks away onto Reid Street heading toward Lake City, while US 17 takes a turn to the direct north. The last major intersection in Palatka is with the northern terminus of SR 19. North of here, the road follows CSX Transportation's "A" Line, the same one used by Amtrak that serves Palatka station. The road follows that line until it reaches Bostwick, where it runs along CR 209, while US 17 shifts to the northwest.

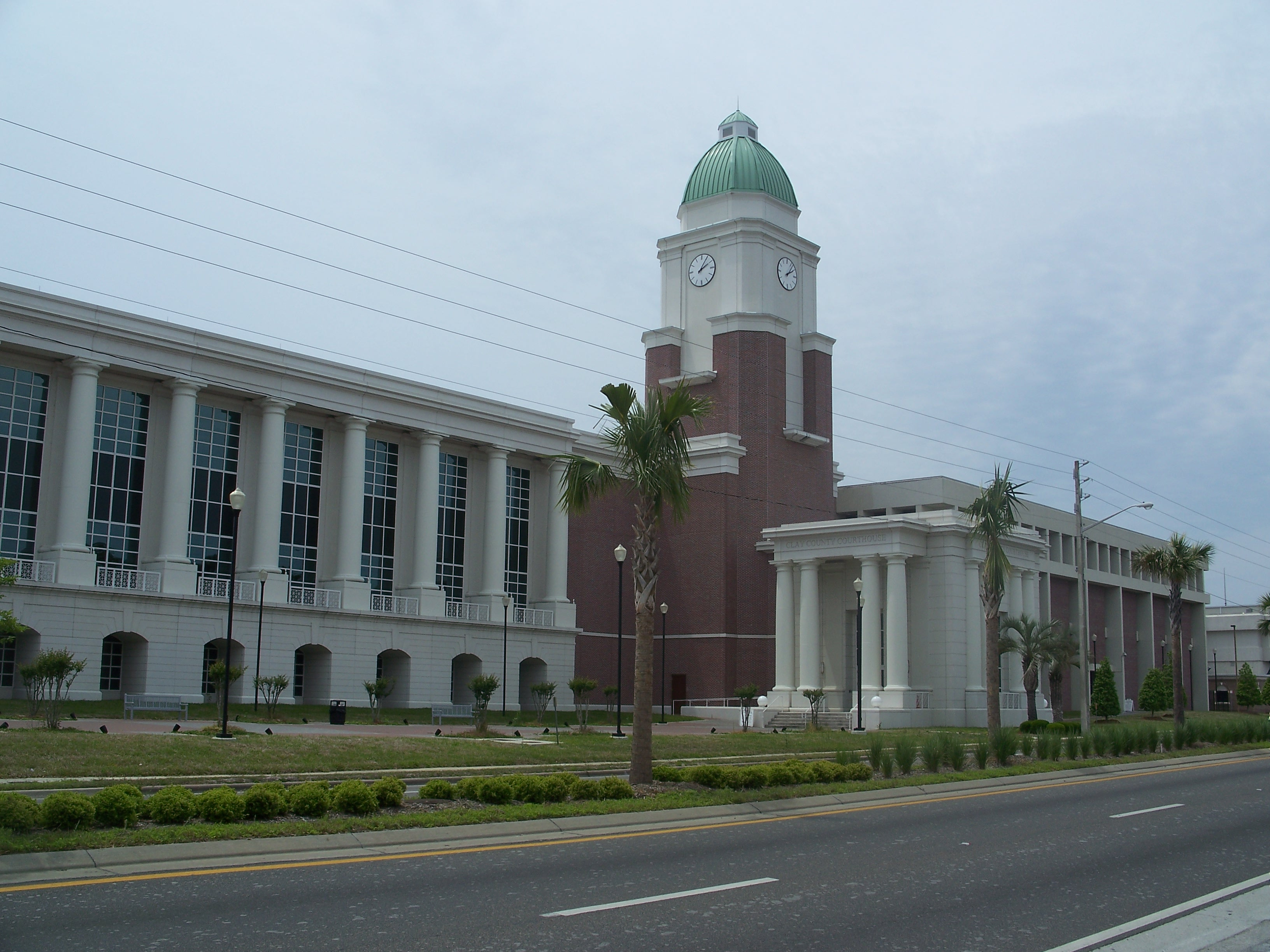
US 17 in Green Cove Springs

In Clay County, US 17 continues its rural surroundings until it enters suburban Jacksonville. South of Green Cove Springs it goes over the same Amtrak line it ran parallel to between Palatka and Bostwick and becomes the northern terminus of CR 209, only to later intersect with eastbound SR 16, where it forms a concurrency and becomes Orange Avenue. Most of this segment runs through preserved wetlands with no structures whatsoever, except for a local Elks Lodge until it reaches Oak Street. SR 16 turns west at Ferris Street while US 17 continues north along part of the Green Cove Springs Historic District, then past various Clay County government buildings. After this, it crosses over the Governors Creek Bridge where it continues its status as a commercial strip, although the commercialization diminishes somewhat after Shedd Road. After passing by the entrance of Camp Chowenwaw Park, US 17 crosses Black Creek and enters Hibernia, where it encounters Black Creek Park on the other side of the creek and runs parallel to the Black Creek Rail Trail. The road then enters Fleming Island where it serves as the eastern terminus of CR 220 (Doctor's Inlet Road), which is also the intersection of Bald Eagle Road. Black Creek Trail ends on the bridge over Doctor's Inlet, but US 17 continues to move north into Orange Park, where the road is known as Park Avenue. Besides serving as the eastern terminus of SR 224, it also serves as the location of the Orange Park Kennel Club, just south of the interchange with I-295 which itself serves as the border between Orange Park and Jacksonville, Jacksonville, where the road becomes Roosevelt Boulevard.

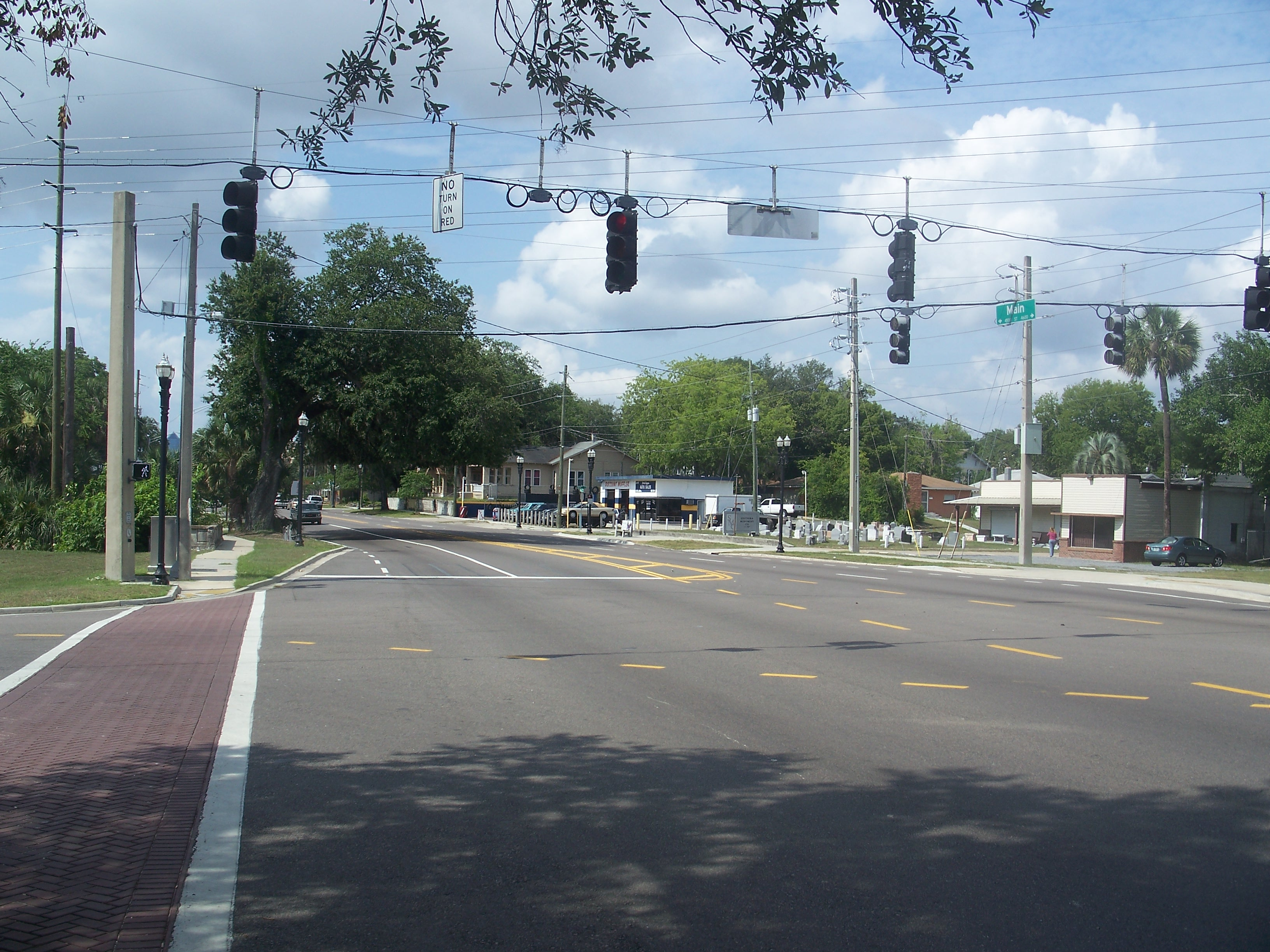
US 17 in north Jacksonville

Here, the highway goes past Naval Air Station Jacksonville (NAS Jax). Near downtown Jacksonville, US 17 joins I-10 for approximately one mile (1.6 km), before merging into I-95. US 17 then exits onto US 23 and continues as North Main Street along with US 1 until it reaches the Martin Luther King Jr. Parkway then continues on its own through Northside where it crosses the Trout River only to pass through less urban surroundings before it crosses the Nassau County border.

In Nassau County, US 17 enters Hedges and then Yulee where it intersects SR 200/SR A1A. US 17 turns northwest and continues into Becker where it intersects CR 108 to the west, then a truck weigh station on the east side and finally as it enters the former turpentine making village of Gross, encounters the last interchange with I-95 in the state, a partial cloverleaf interchange on both the northwest and northeast corners of the I-95 bridge over both the road and CSX Transportation's Kingsland Subdivision. More than a mile (1.6 km) after an abandoned motel, as well as a gas station and truck repair shop, US 17 later curves north at a Florida Agricultural Inspection Station and reaches the Georgia border, crossing over the St. Marys River.

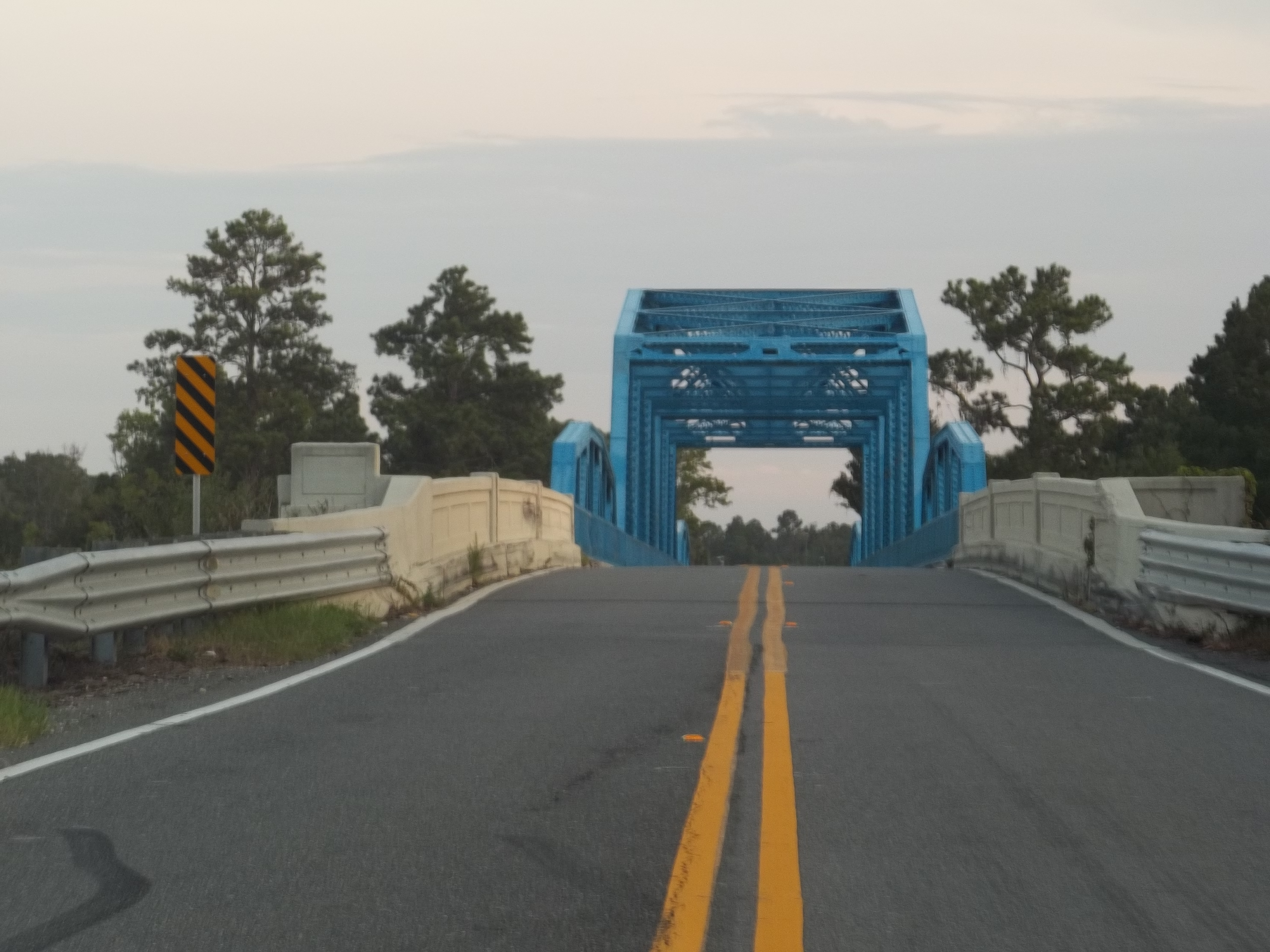
US 17 bridge on the Florida–Georgia border

== History ==
A US 17 shield used in Florida prior to 1993

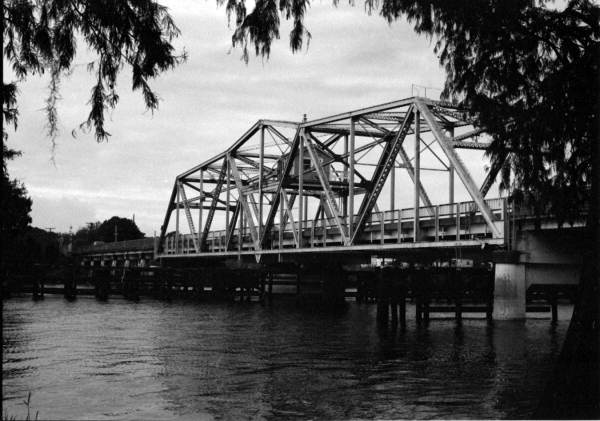
The original Lake Monroe Bridge over St. Johns River, which carried US 17 (and US 92) from 1933 to 1994

US 17 was one of the original routes of the U.S. Numbered Highway System, which was established in 1926. It initially terminated in Jacksonville but was extended south through Orlando to Punta Gorda in 1932.

From 1956, signs for U.S. Highways in Florida had different colors for each highway. The "shield" for US 17 was yellow until the state was forced by the federal government to conform to standards that required consistent black-and-white signs in 1993.

In 1980, US 17 was realigned and elevated slightly at the southern end in Punta Gorda to accommodate the construction of I-75, which also included splitting the route into the current one-way pairs along Marion Street and Olympia Avenue. The route formerly continued along Marion Avenue to Florida Street and Dundee Road. Since then, US 17 has been incrementally widened to a divided highway with four or more lanes through Charlotte, DeSoto, and Hardee counties. Much of the widening has incorporated a parallel abandoned Florida Southern Railway/Atlantic Coast Line Railroad corridor between Bowling Green and Arcadia, which was removed in the early 1980s. Today, the northbound one-way segment through Wauchula runs along this former rail corridor as well as the southbound one-way segment through Arcadia. In 2006, a short segment was realigned to the east along this rail corridor just north of Arcadia, bypassing Brownville. The former alignment is now known as Cubitis Avenue. Another segment through Zolfo Springs was realigned to the former railroad corridor in early 2018. Main Street in Zolfo Springs is the previous alignment of this segment of US 17.

In 1994, the original Lake Monroe Bridge over the St. Johns River near Sanford, which was built in 1933 along with this segment of US 17, was replaced with the current four-lane Bill Benedict Bridge. The swing span of the original bridge has been preserved and now serves as a pier next to the current bridge.

On August 13, 2004, Hurricane Charley made landfall just before 4:00 pm near the southern terminus of US 17. Incredibly, Charley would either hit or threaten to hit the entire route of US 17, devastating almost the entire route in Florida, at least from Punta Gorda to well north of Orlando (when Charley followed the route of I-4 out to sea). The Georgia stretch of US 17 was not hit but was under a hurricane warning. When Charley made landfall again in South Carolina, its trail all the way through Virginia was close to the route of US 17.

In late 2013, FDOT began an $80-million (equivalent to $106 million in 2024) project to construct a flyover interchange with US 17/US 92 traveling over SR 436 in Casselberry. This interchange was built to alleviate congestion at one of the busiest intersections in Florida. The flyover interchange was completed on April 6, 2015, with a ribbon-cutting ceremony held.

== Major intersections ==
| County | Location | mi | km | Destinations | Notes |
|---|---|---|---|---|---|
| Charlotte | Punta Gorda | 0.000 | 0.000 | US 41 south (Cross Street / SR 45) – Fort Myers | One way street; southern terminus of US 17; SB lanes continue west as Marion Avenue; Olympia Avenue feeds into NB lanes |
| Charlotte | Punta Gorda | 0.184 | 0.296 | US 41 north (SR 45 north) – Port Charlotte | One-way street |
| Charlotte | Solana | 2.20 | 3.54 | I-75 (SR 93) – Naples, Tampa | I-75 exit 164 |
| Charlotte | | 3.436 | 5.530 | CR 74 east (Bermont Road) – Palmdale | |
| Charlotte | | 6.425 | 10.340 | CR 764 (Washington Loop Road) | |
| Charlotte | | 8.098 | 13.032 | CR 764 (Washington Loop Road) | |
| DeSoto | Southfort | 13.107 | 21.094 | CR 761 west | |
| DeSoto | Nocatee | 20.429 | 32.877 | CR 760A east | |
| DeSoto | Nocatee | 21.117 | 33.985 | CR 760 west | |
| DeSoto | Arcadia | 25.165 | 40.499 | SR 70 east (Magnolia Street) – Okeechobee, Ft. Pierce | |
| DeSoto | Arcadia | 25.320 | 40.749 | SR 70 west (Hickory Street) – Bradenton | |
| DeSoto | Cubitis | 28.628 | 46.072 | CR 660 (Moore Avenue) | Continues west as Northeast McKay Street |
| DeSoto | | 30.243 | 48.671 | CR 660 (NE McIntyre Street) | |
| DeSoto | | 33.860 | 54.492 | Cubitis Avenue | former US 17 (prior to 2006) |
| Hardee | Buchanan | 39.548 | 63.646 | Sweetwater Road (CR 634 east) | |
| Hardee | Zolfo Springs | 45.169 | 72.692 | SR 66 east – Okeechobee, West Palm Beach | |
| Hardee | Zolfo Springs | 45.650 | 73.467 | SR 64 – Ona, Avon Park | |
| Hardee | Peace River | | | Doyle E. Carlton Bridge | |
| Hardee | Wauchula | 49.059 | 78.953 | SR 636 east (Main Street) – Avon Park | |
| Hardee | | 52.370 | 84.281 | SR 62 west – Parrish | |
| Hardee | Bowling Green | 55.402 | 89.161 | CR 664 (Main Street) – Paynes Creek Historical State Park | |
| Polk | Fort Meade | 63.518 | 102.222 | US 98 south / CR 630 west (Broadway / SR 700 south) – Avon Park, Sebring | south end of US 98 / SR 700 overlap |
| Polk | Homeland | 68.572 | 110.356 | CR 640 – Homeland, Homeland Heritage Park, Mosaic Peace River Park | |
| Polk | Bartow | 73.861 | 118.868 | To Main Street (SR 35 north) east / SR 60 – Lake Wales, Mulberry, Historic District | south end of SR 555 overlap; north end of SR 35 overlap; former SR 60 Business |
| Polk | Bartow | 74.369 | 119.685 | US 98 north (SR 700 north) to SR 60 – Vero Beach, Lakeland, Tampa, Lake Wales | north end of US 98 / SR 700 overlap; access to Bartow Regional Medical Center |
| Polk | Bartow | 75.839 | 122.051 | To US 98 / Ernest M. Smith Boulevard | north bypass of Bartow |
| Polk | | 79.294 | 127.611 | Bomber Road (CR 559) | |
| Polk | Eagle Lake | 82.124 | 132.166 | SR 540 west to SR 655 | |
| Polk | Eloise | 82.917 | 133.442 | CR 655 south / Lake Shipp Drive (SR 655 north) – Auburndale, Wahneta | |
| Polk | Winter Haven | 83.706 | 134.712 | SR 540 east (Cypress Gardens Boulevard) – Legoland | |
| Polk | Winter Haven | 82.021 | 132.000 | To Central Avenue West east / SR 542 – Polk State College, Dundee, Downtown Winter Haven | |
| Polk | Winter Haven | 85.265 | 137.221 | CR 542 west (Avenue D Northwest) | |
| Polk | Winter Haven | 86.531 | 139.258 | SR 544 (Avenue T Northwest / Havendale Boulevard) – Auburndale, Lucerne Park, Polk State College | |
| Polk | Lake Alfred | 88.772 | 142.865 | US 92 west (SR 600 west) – Auburndale, Lakeland | north end of SR 555 overlap; south end of US 92 / SR 600 overlap |
| Polk | Lake Alfred | 88.863 | 143.011 | CR 555 north (South Buena Vista Drive) | southbound access only |
| Polk | Lake Alfred | 90.074 | 144.960 | CR 557 north (East Pomelo Street / North Buena Vista Drive) to I-4 | |
| Polk | Haines City | 95.62 | 153.89 | US 27 (SR 25) to I-4 – Ocala, Lake Wales, Sebring | interchange |
| Polk | Haines City | 96.600 | 155.463 | 5th Street North (CR 17) | |
| Polk | Haines City | 96.848 | 155.862 | SR 17 south (10th Street South) – Lake Hamilton | |
| Polk | Haines City | 97.658 | 157.165 | CR 580 east (Johnson Avenue East) | |
| Polk | Davenport | 100.972 | 162.499 | CR 547 (Davenport Boulevard) to US 27 | |
| Polk | | 106.964 | 172.142 | CR 54 west (Ronald Reagan Parkway) / SR 538 east (Kinney Harmon Road) / Poinciana Parkway – Loughman, Poinciana | |
| Osceola | | 108.809 | 175.111 | CR 532 west (Osceola-Polk Line Road) to I-4 | |
| Osceola | Poinciana | 112.455 | 180.979 | Poinciana Boulevard – Poinciana – SunRail, north | |
| Osceola | Campbell | 113.914 | 183.327 | Ham Brown Road (CR 535 south) | |
| Osceola | Campbell–Kissimmee line | 115.541 | 185.945 | Pleasant Hill Road (CR 531) – Poinciana | |
| Osceola | Kissimmee | 118.181 | 190.194 | Emmett Street (CR 532) – Downtown Kissimmee, Historic District | Former section of US 17 / US 92 / SR 500 / SR 600 overlap |
| Osceola | Kissimmee | 119.058 | 191.605 | US 192 west (West Vine Street / SR 530) US 17 Truck north / US 92 Truck east (John Young Parkway) / to Osceola Parkway | south end of US 192 / SR 530 overlap |
| Osceola | Kissimmee | 119.809 | 192.814 | US 192 east / US 441 south (East Vine Street / SR 500) to Florida's Turnpike; Main Street – Amtrak, Downtown Kissimmee | north end of US 192 / SR 530 overlap; south end of US 441 / SR 500 overlap |
see US 441 (mile 229.899-247.086)
| Orange | Orlando | 136.996 | 220.474 | US 441 north (Orange Blossom Trail / SR 500) / SR 50 west (Colonial Drive) – Apopka | north end of US 441 / SR 500 overlap; south end of SR 50 overlap |
| Orange | Orlando | 137.79 | 221.75 | I-4 (SR 400) to SR 408 | I-4 exit 83A/84 no access from US 17 south to I-4 east (use SR 527 north) |
| Orange | Orlando | 137.992 | 222.077 | SR 527 south (Orange Avenue) | |
| Orange | Orlando | 138.131 | 222.300 | SR 527 north (North Magnolia Avenue) to I-4 | |
| Orange | Orlando | 138.894 | 223.528 | SR 15 south (Mills Avenue) / SR 50 east (Colonial Drive) to SR 408 | north end of SR 50 overlap; south end of SR 15 overlap |
| Orange | Orlando | 140.077 | 225.432 | To I-4 / Princeton Street | |
| Orange | Winter Park | 141.153 | 227.164 | SR 527 south (Orange Avenue) – Business District | |
| Orange | Winter Park | 141.645 | 227.956 | SR 426 (Fairbanks Avenue) to I-4 | |
| Orange | Winter Park | 142.533 | 229.385 | SR 423 west / US 17 Truck north / US 92 Truck east (Lee Road) to I-4 | |
| Orange | Maitland | 143.400 | 230.780 | Lake Avenue (CR 438A west) – Eatonville | |
| Orange | Maitland | 143.659 | 231.197 | Maitland Avenue (CR 427 north) | |
| Orange | Maitland | 144.782 | 233.004 | SR 414 west / US 17 Truck south / US 92 Truck west (Maitland Boulevard) to I-4 | interchange |
| Seminole | Casselberry | 146.725 | 236.131 | SR 436 to I-4 – Altamonte Springs, Apopka | interchange |
| Seminole | Longwood | 149.487 | 240.576 | SR 434 to I-4 – Longwood, Winter Springs | |
| Seminole | Winter Springs | 152.065 | 244.725 | SR 419 south – Winter Springs, Oviedo | |
| Seminole | Lake Mary | 152.286 | 245.081 | CR 427 (Ronald Reagan Boulevard) | |
| Seminole | Sanford | 154.323 | 248.359 | To I-4 / Lake Mary Boulevard – Orlando-Sanford International Airport | |
| Seminole | Sanford | 155.45 | 250.17 | SR 417 to I-4 / Airport Boulevard – Orlando, Orlando-Sanford International Airport | SR 417 exit 50 |
| Seminole | Sanford | 156.623 | 252.060 | SR 46 east (25th Street) / CR 46A west (H.E. Thomas Jr. Parkway) to I-95 – Mims, Orlando-Sanford International Airport | south end of SR 46 overlap |
| Seminole | Sanford | 157.580 | 253.600 | CR 415 north (13th Street) | |
| Seminole | Sanford | 158.347 | 254.835 | North French Avenue (former US 17/92 north) – Old Lake Monroe Pier; 1st Street East – Business District | Former north end US 17 north / US 92 east / SR 46 overlap |
| Seminole | | 161.738 | 260.292 | SR 46 west / CR 15 south (Upsala Road) – Mt. Dora, Lake Mary | north end of SR 46 overlap |
| Seminole | | | | Orange Blvd (CR 431 west) – Port of Sanford | |
| Seminole | | 161.88 | 260.52 | I-4 west (SR 400) – Orlando | I-4 exit 104 |
| St. Johns River | | 162.427 | 261.401 | C.A. "Bill" Benedict Bridge | |
| Volusia | DeBary | 164.329 | 264.462 | CR 4162 east (Dirksen Drive) to I-4 – Deltona, Enterprise, Gemini Springs | |
| Volusia | DeBary–Orange City line | 167.630 | 269.774 | CR 4146 east (Saxon Boulevard) to I-4 | |
| Volusia | Orange City | 168.429 | 271.060 | To I-4 / Enterprise Road (CR 4156) – Deltona, Enterprise | |
| Volusia | Orange City | 170.187 | 273.889 | CR 4145 east (Graves Avenue) | |
| Volusia | Orange City | 171.93 | 276.69 | SR 472 east to I-4 – Sanford, Orlando | interchange |
| Volusia | DeLand | 172.644 | 277.844 | CR 4116 (Orange Camp Road / McGregor Road) – Lake Helen | |
| Volusia | DeLand | 173.683 | 279.516 | SR 15A north (Taylor Road) – Bunnell, Palatka, Hontoon Island State Park, truck bypass to US 17 north / US 92 east / SR 44 west | |
| Volusia | DeLand | 175.685 | 282.738 | SR 44 (New York Avenue) – Eustis, New Smyrna Beach | |
| Volusia | DeLand | 177.533 | 285.712 | US 92 east / CR 92 west (International Speedway Boulevard / SR 600) – Daytona Beach | north end of US 92 / SR 600 overlap |
| Volusia | | 178.731 | 287.640 | SR 11 north / Glenwood Road (CR 4088 west) – Bunnell, Glenwood | |
| Volusia | | 180.357 | 290.256 | SR 15A south / CR 15A north (Spring Garden Avenue) – Orlando, Bunnell, truck bypass to US 17 south / US 92 west / SR 44 west | |
| Volusia | DeLeon Springs | 182.824 | 294.227 | CR 4053 south (Retta Street) – Glenwood, Lake Woodruff National Wildlife Refuge | |
| Volusia | DeLeon Springs | 183.324 | 295.031 | CR 3 north (Ponce Deleon Boulevard) – De Leon Springs State Park | |
| Volusia | Barberville | 189.703 | 305.297 | SR 40 – Silver Springs, Ormond Beach | |
| Volusia | Connersville | 196.971 | 316.994 | CR 3 south – Lake George Wildlife Management Area | |
| Volusia | Seville | 200.024 | 321.907 | CR 305 east – Bunnell | |
| Putnam | Crescent City | 208.459 | 335.482 | CR 308 west – Fruitland, Georgetown, Welaka State Forest | |
| Putnam | Pomona Park | 215.402 | 346.656 | CR 308B west (West Main Street) – Welaka | |
| Putnam | Satsuma | 220.848 | 355.420 | CR 309 south – Welaka, Welaka State Forest | |
| Putnam | | 223.7 | 360.0 | Dunns Creek Bridge over Dunns Creek | |
| Putnam | San Mateo | 226.924 | 365.199 | SR 100 east (SR 20 east) – Bunnell | south end of SR 20 / SR 100 overlap |
| Putnam | East Palatka | 229.925 | 370.028 | SR 207 north – Hastings, St. Augustine | |
| Putnam | | 231.6 | 372.7 | Memorial Bridge over St. Johns River | |
| Putnam | Palatka | 232.577 | 374.296 | SR 20 west (9th Street) – Interlachen, Ravine Gardens State Park | north end of SR 20 overlap |
| Putnam | Palatka | 233.772 | 376.220 | SR 100 west – Keystone Heights, truck route to SR 20 west | north end of SR 100 overlap |
| Putnam | Palatka | 234.836 | 377.932 | SR 19 south – Salt Springs, St. Johns River State College, truck route to SR 20 west | |
| Putnam | Pecan | 236.136 | 380.024 | CR 216 west | |
| Putnam | | 238.216 | 383.371 | CR 209 north | |
| Putnam | Bostwick | 242.474 | 390.224 | CR 209 south (Palmetto Bluff Road) | |
| Clay | | 247.205 | 397.838 | CR 214 west (Sungarden Road) | |
| Clay | | 248.207 | 399.450 | CR 214 east (Decoy Road) | |
| Clay | Virginia Village | 253.058 | 407.257 | CR 226 east | |
| Clay | | 254.030 | 408.822 | CR 15A north | |
| Clay | | 255.474 | 411.146 | SR 23 north (First Coast Expressway) to I-10 – Jacksonville, Lake City | Interchange |
| Clay | | 256.236 | 412.372 | CR 209 south | |
| Clay | Green Cove Springs | 257.846 | 414.963 | SR 16 east – St. Augustine | south end of SR 16 overlap |
| Clay | Green Cove Springs | 258.476 | 415.977 | SR 16 west (Ferris Street) – Penney Farms, Starke | north end of SR 16 overlap |
| Clay | | 261.300 | 420.522 | CR 315 west | |
| Clay | | 261.889 | 421.469 | CR 209 west | |
| Clay | | 261.988 | 421.629 | CR 209 east | |
| Clay | Fleming Island | 264.451 | 425.593 | CR 15A (Hibernia Road) | |
| Clay | Fleming Island | 266.737 | 429.272 | CR 220 west / CR 15A east (Bald Eagle Road) – Doctors Inlet, St. Johns River State College, Middleburg | |
| Clay | Fleming Island | 268.019 | 431.335 | CR 15B (Raggedy Point Road) | |
| Clay | Fleming Island | 269.165 | 433.179 | CR 15A (Westover Road) | |
| Clay | Orange Park | 271.126 | 436.335 | SR 224 west (Kingsley Avenue) | |
| Duval | Jacksonville | 272.98 | 439.32 | I-295 (SR 9A) – St. Augustine, Savannah | I-295 exit 10 |
| Duval | Jacksonville | 276.948 | 445.705 | SR 134 west (Timuquana Road) – Cecil Field | |
| Duval | Jacksonville | 277.048 | 445.866 | Ortega Boulevard | former SR 211 north |
| Duval | Jacksonville | 279.804 | 450.301 | SR 128 (San Juan Avenue) to I-10 | |
| Duval | Jacksonville | 280.655 | 451.670 | Park Street east – FSCJ Kent Campus | |
| Duval | Jacksonville | 280.77 | 451.86 | SR 21 south (Blanding Boulevard) | interchange; no northbound exit |
| Duval | Jacksonville | 281.76 | 453.45 | Edgewood Avenue | interchange |
| Duval | Jacksonville | 282.060 | 453.932 | To I-10 west / Roosevelt Boulevard | former US 17 north / SR 15 north |
| Duval | Jacksonville | 282.275 | 454.278 | SR 129 north / SR 228 west (McDuff Avenue) | south end of SR 228 overlap |
| Duval | Jacksonville | 283.117 | 455.633 | I-10 west (SR 8) to I-295 – Lake City | south end of I-10 / SR 8 overlap (US 17 follows exit 361); southbound exit and northbound entrance |
| Duval | Jacksonville | 283.61 | 456.43 | Stockton Street – Riverside | I-10 exit 362 (northbound); I-95 exit 351C (southbound) |
| Duval | Jacksonville | 284.062 | 457.153 | I-95 south (SR 9) – Jacksonville Beaches, Daytona Beach | north end of I-10 / SR 8 overlap; south end of I-95 / SR 9 overlap (US 17 takes exit 352D/351B) |
| Duval | Jacksonville | 284.4 | 457.7 | Forest Street / Riverside Avenue – Convention Center | I-95 exit 352A |
| Duval | Jacksonville | 285.0 | 458.7 | Forsyth Street – Convention Center | I-95 exit 352B (northbound exit and southbound entrance) |
| Duval | Jacksonville | 285.2 | 459.0 | Monroe Street – Downtown | I-95 exit 352C (no southbound exit) |
| Duval | Jacksonville | 285.3 | 459.1 | Church Street, Myrtle Avenue, Forsyth Street | I-95 exit 353A (southbound exit only) |
| Duval | Jacksonville | 285.5 | 459.5 | I-95 north (SR 9 / SR 15 north) – International Airport, Savannah US 23 north (Kings Road / SR 139) | north end of I-95 / SR 9 / SR 15 overlap (US 17 follows exit 353C); south end of US 23 / SR 139 overlap |
| Duval | Jacksonville | 285.577 | 459.592 | To I-95 / US 90 (Beaver Street) / North Davis Street | |
| Duval | Jacksonville | 286.169 | 460.544 | US 90 Alt. west (North Laura Street) | |
| Duval | Jacksonville | 286.263 | 460.696 | US 1 south / SR 228 east (North Main Street / SR 5 south); East Union Street (SR 139 south / SR 10A east) | north end of US 23 / SR 139 / SR 228 overlap; south end of US 1 / SR 5 overlap |
| Duval | Jacksonville | 287.344 | 462.435 | To I-95 / 8th Street | to SR 114 |
| Duval | Jacksonville | 288.08 | 463.62 | US 1 north / US 1 Alt. south (M.L. King Jr. Parkway / SR 115) to I-95 | north end of US 1 overlap |
| Duval | Jacksonville | 288.391 | 464.120 | SR 122 west (27th Street) | |
| Duval | Jacksonville | 289.761 | 466.325 | SR 111 south (Tallulah Avenue) | |
| Duval | Jacksonville | 291.673 | 469.402 | SR 105 north (Zoo Parkway) to I-95 | interchange |
| Duval | Jacksonville | 292.111 | 470.107 | To I-95 south / Clark Road | |
| Duval | Jacksonville | 293.264 | 471.963 | SR 104 west (Busch Drive) to I-95 | former SR 163 south |
| Duval | Jacksonville | 295.22 | 475.11 | I-295 (SR 9A) to I-95 | I-295 exit 36 |
| Duval | Jacksonville | 296.520 | 477.203 | Airport Center Drive – Airport | to SR 102 |
| Duval | Jacksonville | 297.590 | 478.925 | To I-95 / Duval Road | former SR 110 west |
| Duval | Jacksonville | 299.488 | 481.979 | To I-95 / Pecan Park Road | |
| Nassau | Yulee | 307.732 | 495.247 | SR 200 / SR A1A to I-95 / US 301 – Callahan, Amelia Island, Fernandina | |
| Nassau | Becker | 312.415 | 502.783 | CR 108 west – Hilliard | |
| Nassau | Gross | 314.64 | 506.36 | I-95 (SR 9) – Jacksonville, Savannah | I-95 exit 380 |
| St. Marys River | | 317.070 | 510.275 | Blue Bridge; Florida–Georgia line | |
| St. Marys River | | 317.070 | 510.275 | US 17 north (SR 25 north) – Kingsland, Brunswick | Continuation into Georgia |
1.000 mi = 1.609 km; 1.000 km = 0.621 mi: Concurrency terminus; Incomplete access; Unopened

== See also ==
U.S. Route 17
| Previous state: Terminus | Florida | Next state: Georgia |
