= Virginia Village, Florida =

Unincorporated community in Florida, U.S.

Coordinates: 29.9206°N 81.6823°W

Virginia Village is an unincorporated community in Clay County, Florida, United States. It is located along US 17 at the intersection with Clay CR 226, and has an airstrip named Haller Airpark. The historic Bellamy Road also ran through the community, and currently survives as a dirt road intersecting the southbound lanes of US 17 with a historic marker on the northwest corner.
