= Buckman Bridge =

Bridge in Florida, United States of America

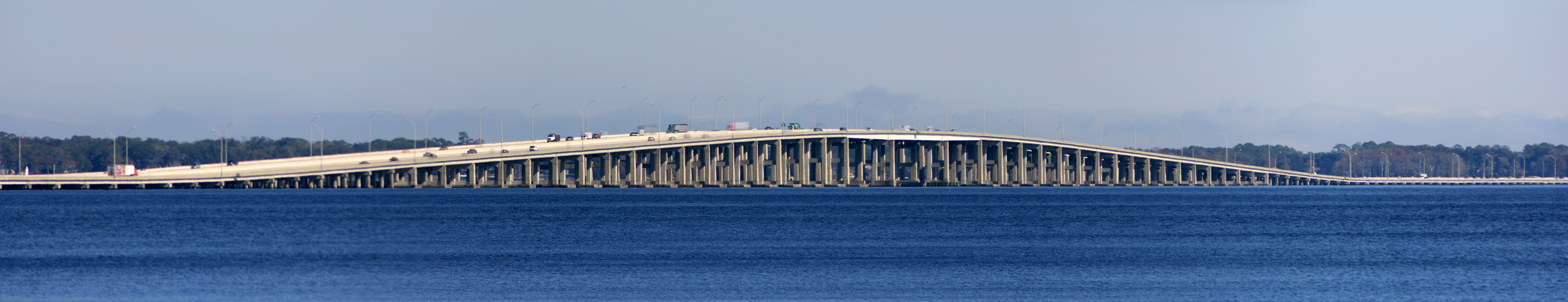
- Coordinates: 30.1901°N 81.6665°W
- Carries: 8 general purpose lanes of I-295
- Crosses: St. Johns River
- Locale: Jacksonville, Florida
- Official name: Henry Holland Buckman Bridge
- Maintained by: Florida Department of Transportation
- ID number: 720249 southbound 720343 northbound

Characteristics
- Design: steel stringer/multi-beam or girder bridge
- Total length: 16,300 feet (3.09 miles, 4968.2 m)
- Width: 35 feet (10.7 m) per direction
- Longest span: 250 feet (76.2 m)
- Clearance above: N/A
- Clearance below: 65 feet (19.8 m)

History
- Opened: May 1, 1970; 56 years ago

Location
- Interactive map of Buckman Bridge

The Henry Holland Buckman Bridge carries I-295 West Beltway traffic over the St. Johns River in Jacksonville, Florida. It was named for Henry Holland Buckman, a prominent legislator and attorney who was instrumental in establishing the Florida state road system.

== History ==
Before the opening of the bridge (1970), road travel across the St. Johns River from Orange Park to Mandarin was longer and more complex. One route involved driving north to downtown Jacksonville, crossing the Fuller Warren Bridge, then driving south, a distance of nearly 30 miles (48 km) and an hour of travel time. Another option was to drive south to Green Cove Springs and across the wooden planks of the Shands Bridge, almost twice the distance of the northern route.

The first public hearing about the bridge was held in July 1963. In April 1964, after intense discussion, the decision was made to place the bridge in Duval County, just north of the Clay County line. Construction began, but the first concrete pilings exploded days after they were poured. Investigation revealed that the heat generated from the curing concrete increased Anaerobic digestion by bacteria in the brackish water and generated methane gas. The engineers were forced to change their construction method.

== Details ==
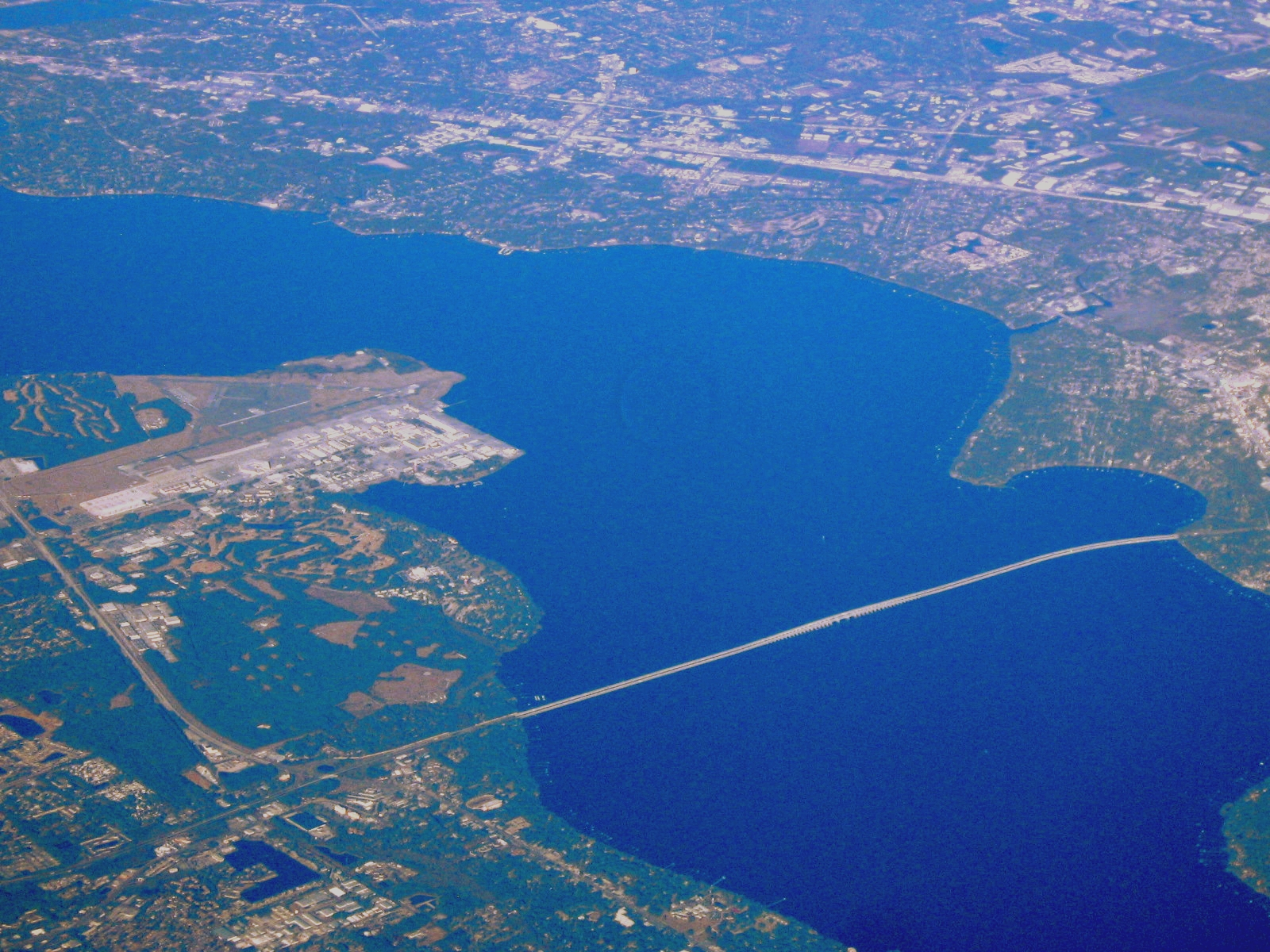
An aerial view of the bridge looking northeast; NAS Jacksonville lies north of the western terminus of the bridge, seen in the left-center portion of this photo.

The bridge is of beam-type construction, approximately 3.1 miles (5.0 km) in length, and travels roughly east–west. The eastbound (carrying I-295 South traffic) and westbound (carrying I-295 North traffic) lanes are built on separate bridge structures. Average daily traffic in 1996 was estimated at 78,000 vehicles. In 1995, the bridge was expanded from two lanes in each direction with partial breakdown lanes to four lanes in each direction with full breakdown lanes. A Florida Department of Transportation study in September 1997 counted 110,743 vehicles. With busy exits within a 0.5 miles (0.80 km) of either end of the bridge, rush-hour backups are typical. Downtown Jacksonville and Naval Air Station Jacksonville are visible from the bridge to the north. On a clear day, the Seminole Electric power plant in Palatka can be seen to the south of the bridge.

== Closings ==
While rarely closed for weather, two situations have made shutdown necessary: Tropical Storm Fay and prolonged freezing conditions. During tropical storms or hurricanes, sustained winds of over 40 miles per hour (64 km/h) are considered hazardous and warrant closure. On December 23, 1989 the temperature dropped to 26° and precipitation changed from rain to sleet to snow, which lasted for several days. All the bridges in Jacksonville were impassable and closed for more than 24 hours, except for the original St. Elmo W. Acosta Bridge, which was first opened to traffic in 1921.

== See also ==
- List of crossings of the St. Johns River
