= William M. Rigdon =

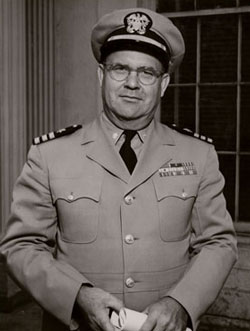
- Commander William M. Rigdon in uniform
- Born: 1904; Statesboro, Georgia
- Died: April 24, 1991 (aged 87)
- Occupation: United States Navy
- Known for: Assistant Naval Aide in the White House, 1942-53, Franklin and Truman Eras

Commander William M. Rigdon (1904-1991) is most known for being the Assistant Naval Aide in the United States White House from 1942 to 1953 during the presidencies of Harry S. Truman and Franklin D. Roosevelt. Several of his works are in the Harry S. Truman Library & Museum.

== Life ==
Rigdon was born in Statesboro, Georgia in 1904. He enlisted in the Navy in 1923 and eventually became a Commander under President Truman. He served as Assistant Naval Aide in the White House from 1942 to 1953, but his most famous works were during the Truman Era. On August 1, 1953 he retired from the Navy after 20 years of service.

After the retiring from the Navy, Rigdon attended the School of Hotel Administration at Cornell University from 1953–1954 and became the Executive Secretary of the Virginia Hotel Company in July 1954.

in 1964, he published the White House Sailor, which was an account of his career during the Franklin and Truman Presidencies. It was co-written with James Derieux.

== Truman Library Series ==
The William M. Rigdon Papers are kept in the Truman Library and document his service from 1945 to 1953 as Assistant Naval Aide to the President. The documents mainly consist of information about Harry S. Truman's official travel and vacations, and visits to the United States. by foreign Heads of State. The collection includes newspaper clippings, magazine articles, correspondence, charts, menus, price lists for food, and travel itineraries. Rigdon had been the Assistant Naval Aide under Franklin D. Roosevelt since 1942, but the collection contains no documents dating from before 1945.

Commander Rigdon was in charge of arranging many of the details surrounding Truman's vacations, some official State visits, and some visits to the U.S. by foreign Heads of State. The Rigdon papers are diverse in content. The collection includes documents about the Potsdam Conference in July and August 1945, and Truman's return to the United States on the USS Augusta (CA-31) when the first atomic bomb was dropped in Japan on August 6, 1945. President Truman made many recreational voyages aboard the Presidential yacht, the USS Williamsburg. The collection includes an array of price lists and menus for food served on Truman's voyages as well as handwritten mileage charts. Many of Truman's Whistlestop Campaign speeches from 1948 are in the collection, along with speeches supporting the Democratic Party during the 1952 election. Also included are handwritten notes, formal correspondence, meeting minutes, press releases, newspaper clippings, magazine articles, and maps. Photos are also included in the collection, but are cross referenced to the audiovisual collection.

This collection reflects a more personal side of President Truman and his family. For instance, Margaret Truman wrote a short note which is included in the papers requesting which films she wanted her father to see while they were on vacation in Key West. Bess Truman discussed luncheon plans in another handwritten note. Yet another document lists the bets President Truman and many members of his Administration made on college football games one season. The collection also contains many subpoenas and trial proceedings from "The Royal High Court of the Raging Main" (which were meant to be a joke) from Truman's voyage on the USS Missouri (BB-63) in 1947.

Other materials at the Truman Library relating to William M. Rigdon and his duties as Assistant Naval Aide include oral history interviews with Commander William M. Rigdon and Donald J. MacDonald, the Leo W. Roberts Papers, the Robert Dennison Papers, and the President's Travel Logs, which were prepared by Rigdon. Other collections of Rigdon Papers are available at the Franklin D. Roosevelt Library and at Georgia Southern University.
