= Lake Monroe Bridge =

Bridge in Florida, United States of America

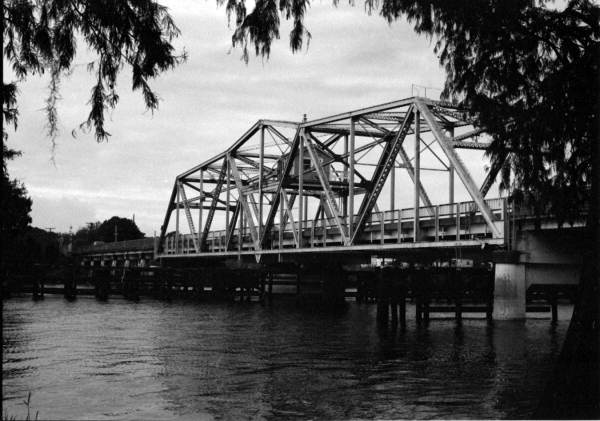
- 1981 photograph of the old Lake Monroe Bridge, which was closed in 1994
- Coordinates: 28°50′12″N 81°19′27″W
- Carries: 2 lanes of US 17 / US 92
- Crosses: St. Johns River
- Locale: Sanford, Florida and DeBary, Florida

Characteristics
- Design: Warren truss Swing Bridge
- Total length: 627 feet

History
- Opened: 1933
- Closed: 1994

Location
- Interactive map of Lake Monroe Bridge

Lake Monroe Bridge was a two-lane steel bridge constructed over the St. Johns River at the west outlet of Lake Monroe between 1933 and 1934. The bridge was a part of U.S. Route 17/92, and spanned the border between Seminole and Volusia Counties in Florida, United States. On the Seminole side is Sanford and on the Volusia side is DeBary. Historical markers claim the bridge was the first electrically operated swing bridge in the State of Florida. In 1994 it was replaced by the Bill Benedict Bridge, the old bridge is now a pier on the Sanford Side. It also has a bike path.

== History ==
Lake Monroe Bridge was originally built between 1932 and 1933 as a replacement for a wooden bridge (tolled until 1926) that was manually operated. The bridge was a Warren-Truss Swing bridge, fabricated by Ingall's Iron Works of Birmingham, Alabama, the swing gear was manufactured by Earle Gear and Machine Company of Philadelphia, Pennsylvania, and was erected by W.W. White of St. Petersburg, Florida. The contracting company for the Florida State Road Department was Kreis Contracting Company of Knoxville, Tennessee.

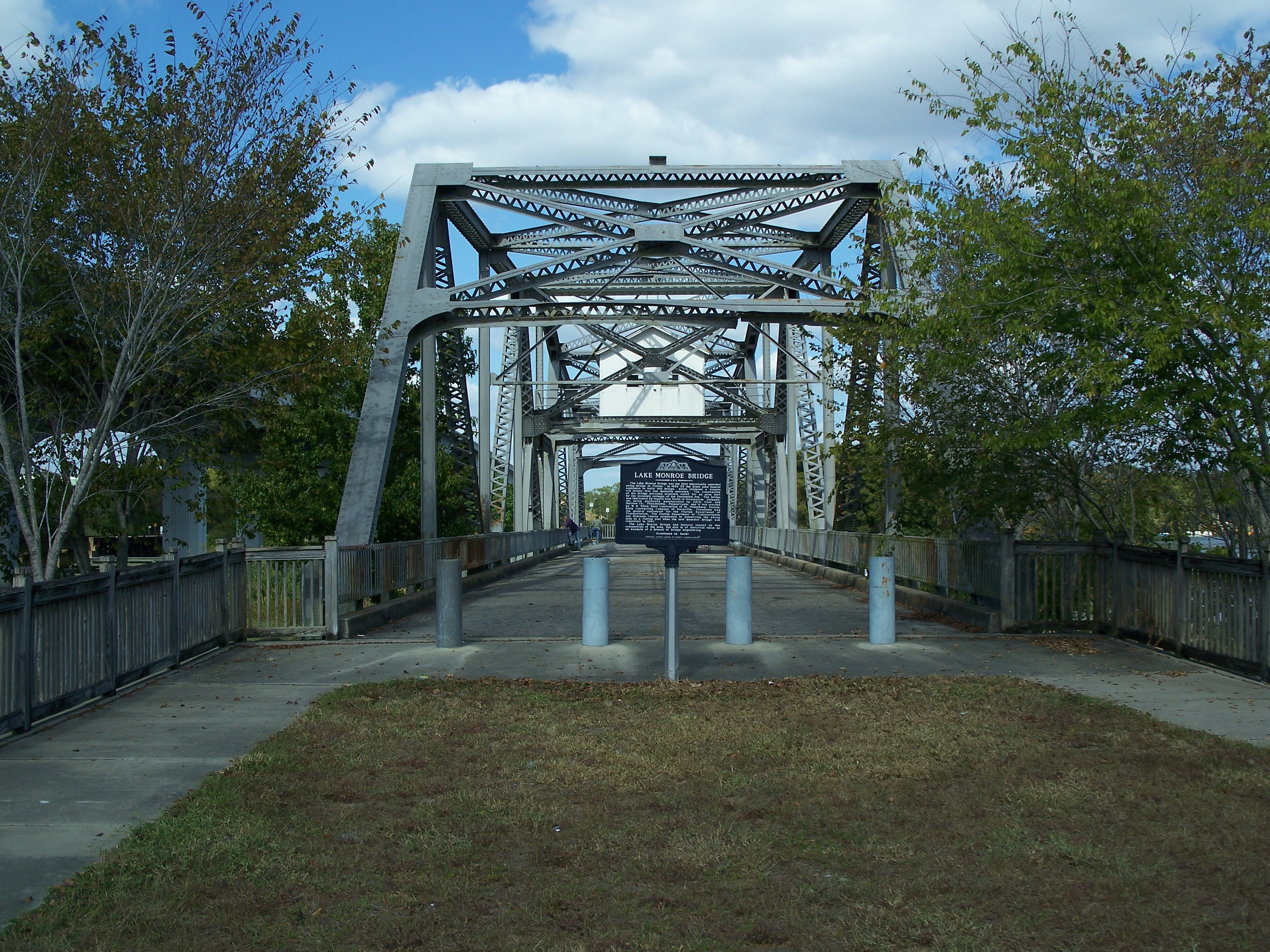
Lake Monroe Bridge today

Construction of the bridge provided economic relief to the region during the peak of the Great Depression, and the tourism it facilitated provided further relief after that period. When Interstate 4 was built in the late-1960s along with the original version of the nearby St. Johns River Veterans Memorial Bridge, it provided temporary relief for the Lake Monroe Bridge, which proved to be crucial after the opening of Walt Disney World southwest of Orlando. Unfortunately in the latter portion of the 20th Century, the bridge proved to be inadequate to handle more modern traffic. In 1994, the bridge was replaced by the Bill Benedict Bridge a much higher concrete slab bridge that has four lanes, and was built between this and a CSX Railroad drawbridge that originally served the Atlantic Coast Line Railroad. The remnants of the bridge can now be found in Lake Monroe Wayside Park along US 17-92 in Sanford, and now survives as a fishing pier and overlook.
