= Fuller Warren Bridge =

Bridge in Jacksonville, Florida, US

Fuller Warren Bridge (new)
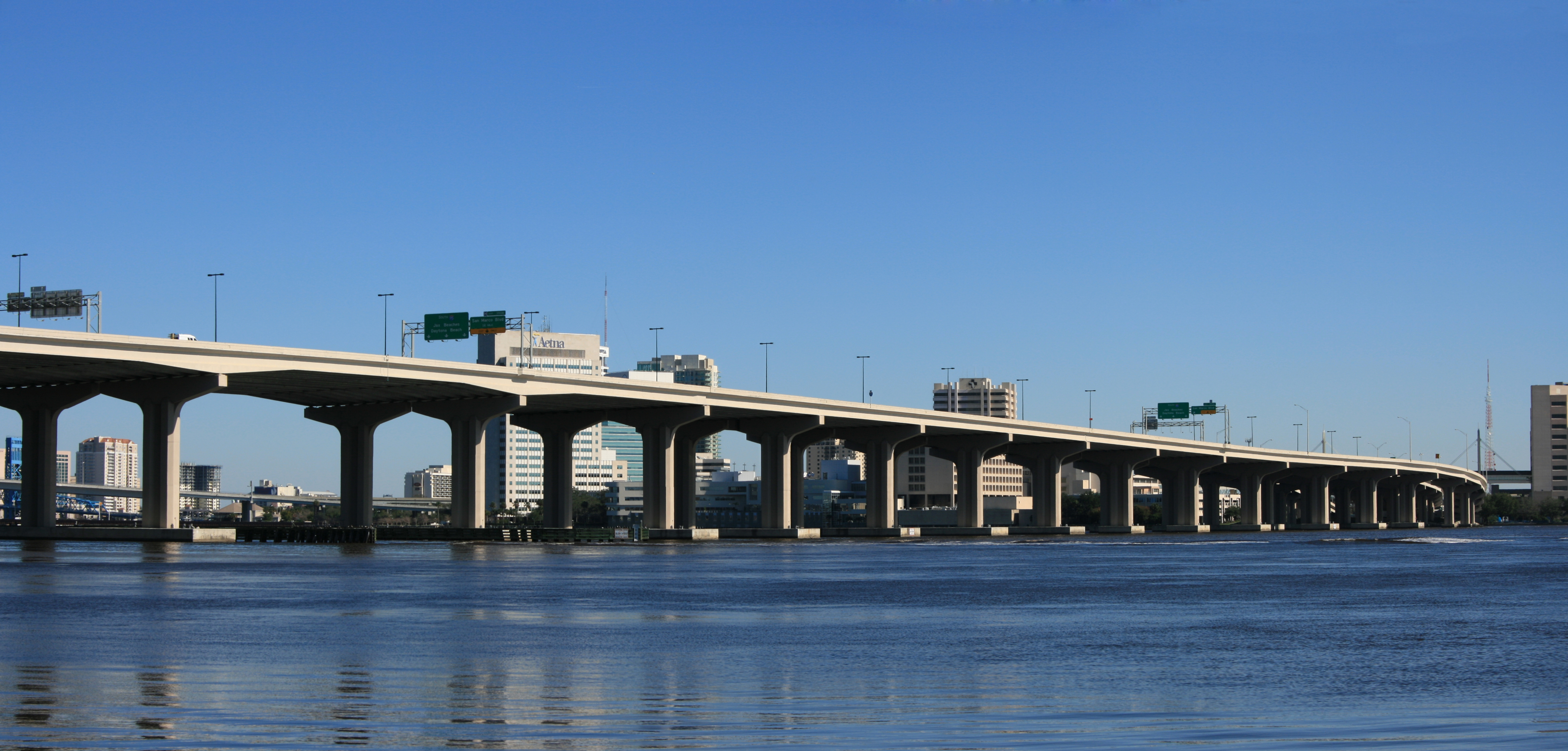
- Coordinates: 30.315°N 81.67166667°W
- Carries: Eight lanes of I-95
- Crosses: St. Johns River
- Locale: Jacksonville, Florida
- Official name: Fuller Warren Bridge
- Maintained by: Florida Department of Transportation
- ID number: 720156

Characteristics
- Design: Prestressed concrete girder bridge
- Total length: 7,500 feet (2,286.0 m)
- Width: Eight general purpose lanes Three auxiliary lanes Shared-use path
- Longest span: 250 feet (76.2 m)
- Clearance above: Unlimited
- Clearance below: 75 feet (22.9 m)

History
- Opened: April 16, 2000; 26 years ago (Partially completed for I-10 Eastbound to I-95 Southbound traffic); November 17, 2002; 23 years ago (All lanes opened)

Location
- Interactive map of Fuller Warren Bridge (new)

Fuller Warren Bridge (old)
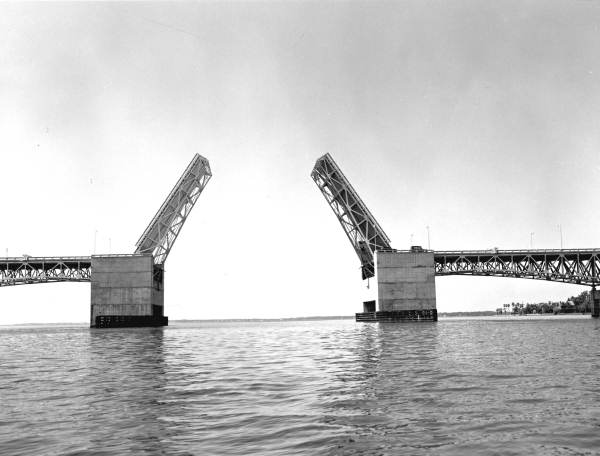
- The Fuller Warren bascule bridge in 1954.
- Coordinates: 30.315°N 81.67166667°W
- Carries: four general purpose lanes
- Crosses: St. Johns River
- Locale: Jacksonville, Florida
- Official name: Fuller Warren Bridge
- Maintained by: Florida Department of Transportation
- ID number: 720156

Characteristics
- Design: steel bascule bridge
- Total length: 111.77 meters (367 ft)
- Width: 18.8 meters (62 ft)
- Longest span: 81.4 meters (267 ft)
- Clearance above: Unlimited
- Clearance below: 13.4 meters (44 ft) closed

History
- Opened: June 7, 1954
- Closed: November 17, 2002

Location
- Interactive map of Fuller Warren Bridge (old)

The Fuller Warren Bridge is the prestressed-concrete girder bridge that carries Interstate 95 (I-95) across the St. Johns River in Jacksonville, Florida. The current structure was finished in October 2002, replacing the original bascule-bridge span, finished in 1954.

The current bridge was designed by HNTB Corporation in 1990 and built by Balfour Beatty Construction. It is over 7,500 ft (2,286 m) long, with a main span of 250 feet (76 m), and a vertical clearance of 75 ft (23 m). When completed in 2000, it carried eight lanes across the span.

In the spring of 2018, a construction project began to add two more lanes and a shared-use path to the bridge which was completed in spring 2023.

The eastern end of the transcontinental Interstate 10 (I-10) meets I-95 just west of the bridge.

== Naming ==
The bridge is named after former Florida governor Fuller Warren, former member and eventual denouncer of the KKK, who held the office from 1949 to 1953. He was a member of the Jacksonville City Council from 1931 to 1937.

== Original bridge ==
The original bascule bridge was tolled until 1988, when the city of Jacksonville abolished toll collections. Increasing wear from heavy traffic, including a 1993 incident in which a 3 square feet (0.28 m^{2}) fragment of concrete broke loose, forced officials to ban large trucks from the bridge in 1998. It was permanently closed June 13, 2001, when all traffic was moved to the new Fuller Warren Bridge. After delays in removal because of legal and environmental concerns, the Florida Department of Transportation used explosives to complete demolition of the old bridge on February 17, 2007.

== Switch to new bridge ==
Conversion from the old Fuller Warren Bridge to the new one began with one lane of southbound I-95 traffic on April 16, 2000. The new bridge, built at a cost of approximately $100 million, was opened to all eight lanes in late 2002 and formally dedicated on January 13, 2003.

== Fuller Warren Expansion Project (2017) ==
About 2013, The Florida State Department of Transportation (FDOT) began the Your10&95 project to add operational improvements and enhancements to the I-10, I-95 highway interchange in metro Jacksonville. A planning department held several public meetings to discuss the proposed project and the cost of its construction with residents, community partners and businesses. They also asked for input from the public attendees. The meetings were held on February 10, 2014, on August 28, 2014, and on February 26, 2015. During those meetings, it was suggested that as part of the widening project to add two additional traffic lanes to the Fuller Warren bridge, a pedestrian shared use path should be added as well. The proposed path over the St. Johns River would connect the Riverside and Avondale historic neighborhood with the San Marco historic neighborhood. As the current bridge provides for no pedestrian or bicycle access, the FDOT agreed to implement the shared use path suggestion, as well as a number of other requests, such as adding traffic noise barriers for residents. The project also includes improvements to the I-10 ramps at Stockton and Irene streets. Construction began May 5, 2017 and was expected to be completed in the summer of 2020. See Shared Use Path (SUP) renderings. On the morning of October 4, 2018, a fatal accident involving one of the construction workers caused a temporary suspension of the work. By March, 2019 the project was near half way construction. On April 6, 2023, the shared use path across the St Johns river finally opened.

== Gallery ==
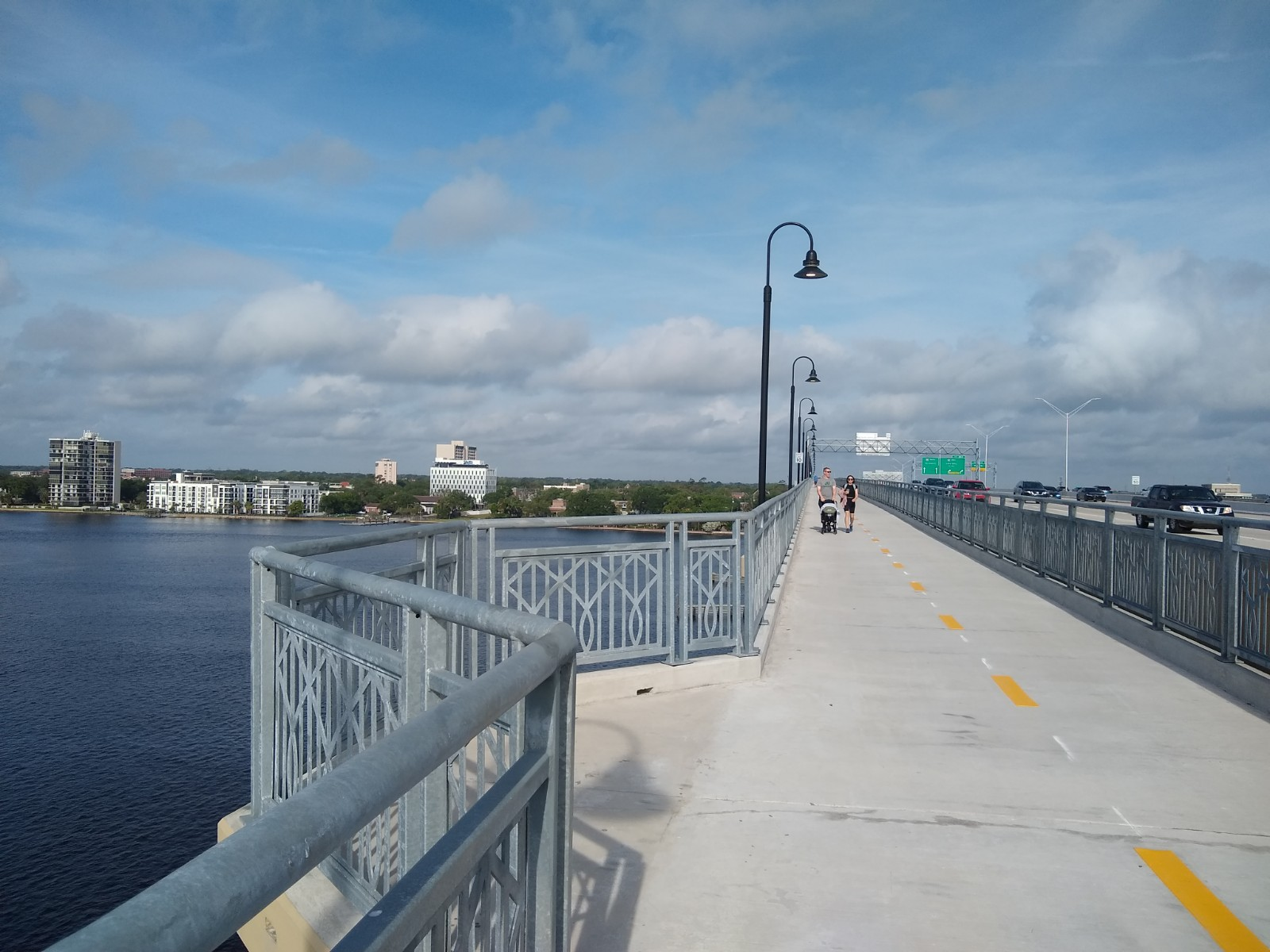
Shared use path view from the top of the Fuller Warren Bridge looking west toward Riverside

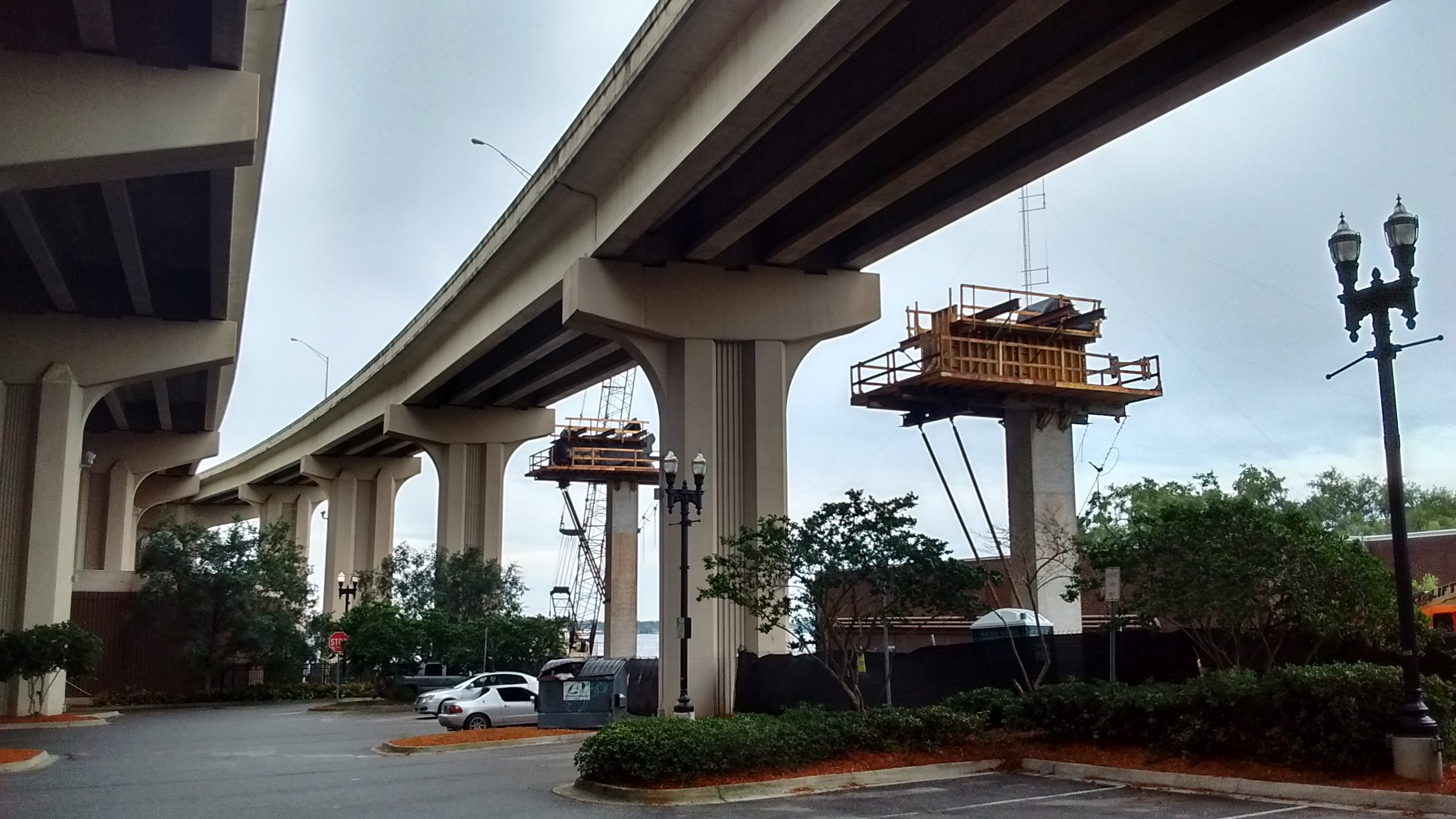
Fuller-Warren Shared Use Path Concrete Supports (July 2018)

== See also ==
- List of crossings of the St. Johns River
