= Memorial Bridge (Palatka, Florida) =

Bridge over St. Johns River in Florida, US

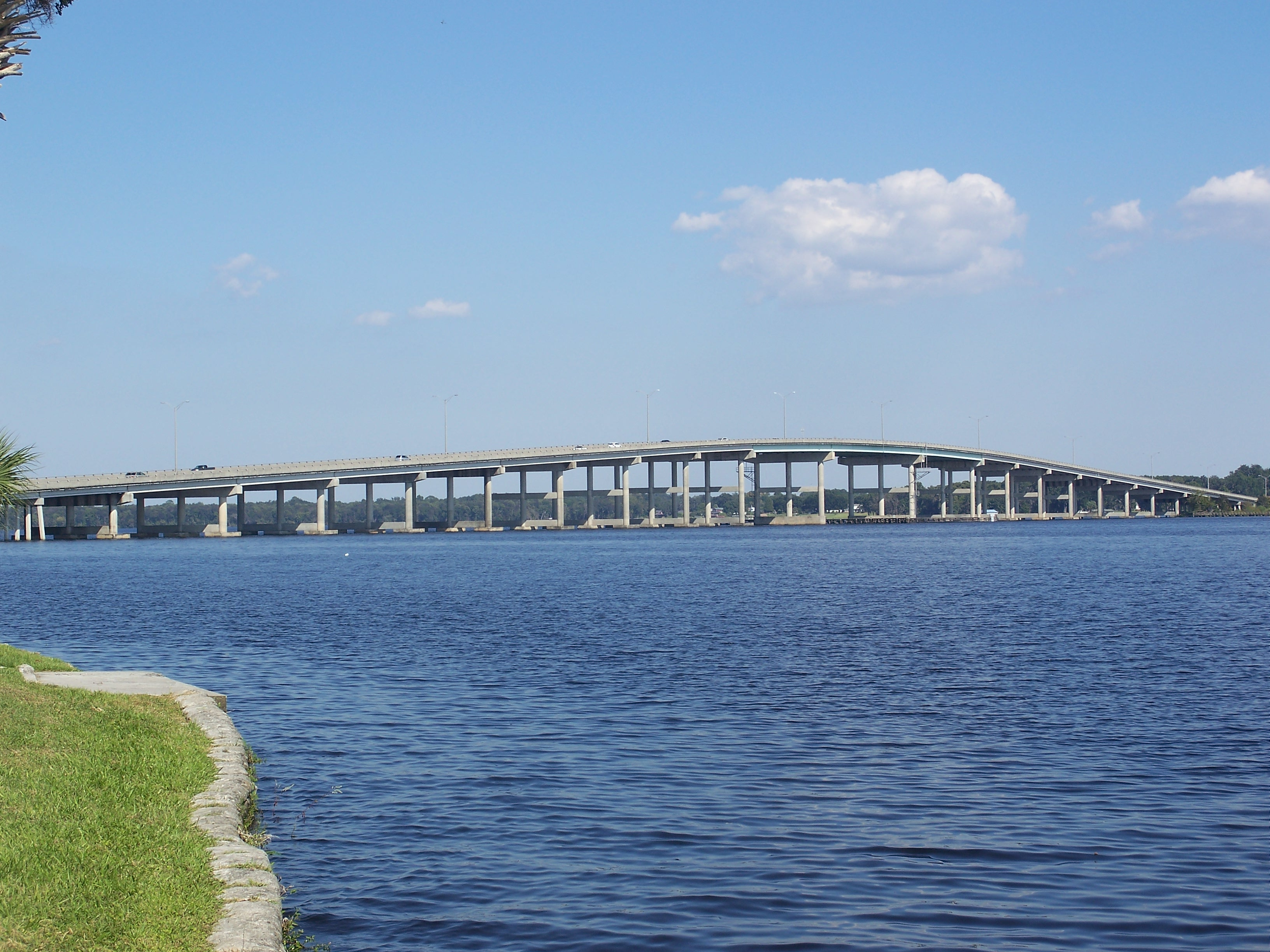
- The bridge as seen from Goodwin Riverfront Park in October 2010
- Coordinates: 29°38′45″N 81°37′22″W
- Carries: 4 lanes of US 17 / SR 100 / SR 15; 2 sidewalks
- Crosses: St. Johns River
- Locale: Palatka, Florida, East Palatka, Florida
- Official name: Memorial Bridge
- Maintained by: Florida Department of Transportation

Characteristics
- Design: continuous prestressed concrete box girder bridge
- Total length: 4,020 feet (1,230 m)
- Clearance below: 65 feet (20 m)

History
- Opened: 1976

Location
- Interactive map of Memorial Bridge

Memorial Bridge spans the St. Johns River and connects Palatka to East Palatka, Florida. The bridge is the only permanent vehicle crossing between Green Cove Springs and Astor. As such, the bridge is an important part of connecting the region. Both US 17 and SR 100 use the bridge as a river crossing.

The first bridge spanning this portion of river was constructed by the Palatka Bridge Company in 1888 and was built for rail operated vehicles. The first concrete bridge was completed in 1927 and carried two lanes of vehicular traffic. The former draw bridge was built to honor the military personnel of Putnam County. Four bronze military service men statues proudly watched over the bridge, with two standing guard at each side. Today, the span continues to commemorate the men and women of Putnam County serving in the military. The Doughboy statues can still be seen at the foot of the current bridge.

Completed in 1976, the four lane bridge is 4,020 ft long and has a vertical clearance of 65 ft. Public parks lie at both ends of the bridge; Goodwin Riverfront Park is on the west end in Palatka, and Veterans Memorial Park is on the east end in East Palatka.
