= Florida State Road 25 =

State highway in Florida, USA

State Road 25

Route information
- Maintained by FDOT
- Length: 428.594 mi (689.755 km) including CR 25
- Existed: 1945 renumbering–present

Major junctions
- South end: I-195 / US 1 in Miami
- SR 60 in Lake Wales; SR 44 in Leesburg; SR 35 in Belleview; US 90 in Lake City
- North end: US 41 / SR 7 towards Lake Park, GA

Location
- Country: United States
- State: Florida
- Counties: Miami-Dade, Broward, Palm Beach, Hendry, Glades, Highlands, Polk, Lake, Marion, Alachua, Columbia, Hamilton

Highway system
- Florida State Highway System; Interstate; US; State; Former; Pre‑1945; Toll; Scenic
| ← SR 24A | → SR 26 |

State Road 25 (SR 25) is a state highway in the U.S. state of Florida. It is mainly signed as U.S. Highways:

- U.S. Highway 27 from Hialeah to Lady Lake and Belleview to Ocala
- U.S. Highway 301 from Belleview to near Sparr
- U.S. Highway 441 from Belleview to Lake City
- U.S. Highway 41 from High Springs to the Georgia state line near Jennings, connecting with Georgia State Route 7.

== Route description ==
=== U.S. Route 27; Miami through the Everglades ===
Florida State Road 25 (SR 25) begins westward in the Edgewater neighborhood between the Blue on the Bay skyscraper and the Charter Club Condominiums on East 36th Street just before it turns into the eastbound on-ramp for Interstate 195. The route is unmarked and only after the intersection with U.S. Route 1 does SR 25 become the hidden state road for U.S. Route 27. One block west at the five-way intersection of Northeast Second Avenue and North Federal Highway, the road has a railroad crossing with the Florida East Coast Railway main line, which is also used by Brightline passenger trains. Four blocks after the crossing, North Miami Avenue provides access to I-195, Interstate 95, and the Airport Expressway. Due to the close proximity of I-195 US 27 and SR 25 pass under Interstate 95 with no access to the route, then intersects U.S. Route 441 (7th Avenue and hidden SR 7). By this time the road is in the Allapattah neighborhood.

State Road 25 has its first encounter with the Miami Metrorail system by passing under Allapattah (Metrorail station) just before the intersection with Florida State Road 933 (Northwest 12th Avenue). The next major intersection is Florida State Road 9 (Northwest 27th Avenue), although this is the penultimate intersection with a major highway for US 27 and SR 25 along 36th Street. US 27 and SR 25 pass under the Miami Metrorail a second time before crossing the Tri-Rail main line and leaving 36th Street under Florida State Toll Route 112 onto Okeechobee Road. From there, 36th Street becomes westbound Florida State Road 948 and the two routes run along the northwest side of the Miami Canal between Hialeah and Miami Springs. Nearly immediately after leaving Northwest 36th Street, the first major intersection along Okeechobee Road is Florida State Road 953, which includes a northbound flyover ramp from SR 953 to US 27. Other major intersections include the western terminus of FL 944 and the southern terminus of FL 823. One last intersection with West 19th Street is available before the road dips below the water level of the canal to pass under Okeechobee (Metrorail station), a Florida East Coast Railway line leading to the Hialeah Yard and the Hialeah Expressway (FL 934). Continuing along the side of this canal, US 27/FL 25 encounters the interchange with Florida State Road 826 which provides northbound and southbound access to SR 826 from northbound SR 25 via the same northbound ramp, containing a southbound U-Turn flyover. Northwest of there, the routes run along the border between Medley and Hialeah Gardens until it reaches the Homestead Extension of Florida's Turnpike at exit 35. While the canal continues to the northwest, the road turns straight north and runs along the eastern edge of the Everglades just before the intersection with Florida State Road 997, The routes cross the Miami-Dade-Broward County Line at the Snake Creek Canal. Once in Broward County, the routes enter the western edges of Pembroke Pines where it serves as the western terminus of Florida State Road 820 and Florida State Road 822 and then enters Southwest Ranches where it serves as the western terminus of Florida State Road 818, only to immediately cross over the South New River Canal where it enters Weston. Within that community, the routes bare to the north-northwest as it approaches the massive interchange with Interstate 75 at exit 23 which is also the eastern terminus of Alligator Alley and the site of the ghost town known as Andytown.

North of I-75, the North New River Canal begins and the Everglades are now found on both sides of the routes. Besides the swamplands, the surroundings include boat ramps, trail heads, canals, and power lines. These features continue as the routes cross the Broward-Palm Beach County Line, passing through the ghost town of Deem City. Deep into the Everglades, the road and the aligning canal curve from the northwest to straight north. Along this section, the route enters the barely existing community of Okeelanta, a location that tried and failed to become a boom town in the early 20th Century, but today is mostly used for sugar harvesting. The only resemblance to a major intersection here is Palm Beach County Road 827. The road continues past Okeelanta with the same sugar crops and little evidence that drivers have left the community. Just as the road enters the City of South Bay, US 27 and SR 25 crosses the first of numerous railroad crossings with the South Central Florida Express. The canal continues straight north while the road curves to the northwest and both routes join a concurrency with Florida State Road 80, which is not a hidden route. Shortly after the end of the west-to-north ramp from westbound SR 80, US 27 and SRs 25 and 80 cross another South Central Florida Express railroad line, which was originally the Lake Harbor Branch of the Florida East Coast Railway. After passing Palm Beach County Fire Rescue station Number 74, and the gas station across the street from it, SR 25 and its accompanying routes curves even more to the left, where they run along the south shore of Lake Okeechobee, protected by the Herbert Hoover Dike which carries the Lake Okeechobee Scenic Trail on top of it. US 27 and SRs 25 and 80 continue northwest along the dike holding Lake Okeechobee from the road until it enters Lake Harbor where it curves straight west and runs over a pair of bridges over the Miami Canal. West of the John Stretch Memorial Park, the routes leave the city limits and curve back up to the northwest, following the Hoover Dike. The last site in the county is the Crooked Horse RV Park before crossing the Palm Beach-Hendry County Line

=== Florida Heartland through Central Florida ===
SR 25 secretly follows northbound US 27 and westbound SR 80 along bridges between to canals in Clewiston.

Continuing near the Herbert Hoover Dike, US 27, along with hidden SR 25 and non-hidden SR 80 pass the northern terminus of Hendry County Road 835 and eventually enters Clewiston, where it adopts the name "Sugarland Highway." A notable feature of this section of the road are the pair of bridges over two canals before running through Downtown Clewiston. While in the city, the road intersects local streets on a typical grid pattern to the south while streets such as Circle Drive, Crescent Drive and Arcadia Avenue loop around to the north only to return to US 27 and SRs 25 and 80 in the opposite order. After this, the routes face the intersection of North and South Lopez Street a pair of bridges over another Canal west of Lopez Street, and as the surroundings seem more less urban, the routes cross the South Central Florida Express railroad line again and leaves the city limits. For the rest of the journey US 27 and hidden SR 25 follows non-hidden SR 80 through the sugar cane fields of South Florida, interrupted only by a truck weigh station in the median. Florida State Road 80 leaves US 27/SR 25 at an interchange built in Whidden's Corner, then turns straight north, only to curve to the west again and cross the Mamie Langdale Memorial Bridge over the Caloosahatchee Canal where it enters the city limits of Moore Haven. State Road 25 as well as US 27 serves as the main road through Moore Haven, and runs along the right side of historic sites such as the Glades County Courthouse, as well as the Glades County Auditorium, and the Bronson Arena. After leaving the city limits, US 27 and SR 25 encounter the intersection with Florida State Road 78 and has a roughly four mile concurrency with that route, which heads towards Citrus Center, LaBelle, North Fort Myers and Pine Island Center. SR 25 curves to the northwest and crosses a railroad crossing with South Central Florida Express, then makes a left curve to run along the north side that railroad. On this segment, the routes pass by the CEMEX-owned Palmdale Sand Mines, and then Gatorama just before the intersection with what seems to be the northern terminus of Florida State Road 29, and suddenly curves more towards the north as it passes through the wetlands of Fisheating Creek before entering Palmdale where it passes by some driveways for the Scotts warehouse hidden behind some brush along the southbound lanes and the South Central Florida Express railroad line. Branching off to the northwest is Glades County Road 17 (Detjen's Dairy Road) the first of many county-maintained former segment of Florida State Road 17. In the meantime, SR 25 is taken from the northwest to the northeast by US 27 as the routes cross the Glades-Highlands County Line.

The first community within Highlands County for hidden SR 25 Venus which contains a single intersection with Glades County Road 731. Approximately 10 miles later the routes enter Bairs Den where the road faces a much more important intersection, specifically Florida State Road 70 Roughly four miles later, the routes encounter what may or may not be a county extension of SR 29 in the form of Highlands County Road 29 followed immediately by Highlands County Road 17 (Old State Route 8), which branches off to the southwest. These two intersections are found near Lake Placid, and after passing between Lake Pearl and Lake McCoy the routes enter the town that's partially named for that lake. Immediately after entering the town limits Highlands County Road 17 branches off to the northwest onto South Main Avenue. The routes turn straight north momentarily and then encounters the shared intersection with Highlands County Road 621 and East Interlake Boulevard (unmarked CR 17A). Westbound CR 621 secretly joins SR 25, and thus US 27. Two blocks later, the routes pass by the Lake Placid Tower. The road curves to the northwest after the intersection with South Lakeview Road, and descends towards the bridge under the South Central Florida Express railroad line, which welcomes southbound traffic to the town. CR 621 branches off to the west at Lake June Road, and also overlaps the northern terminus of the second Highlands CR 17. While US 27 and SR 25 curve more to the north a third CR 17 begins on the east side of the road.

Seven miles after the third CR 17, the road encounter an even more important intersection, specifically U.S. Route 98 and hidden Florida State Road 700, across from the east end of Florida State Road 66. Both sides of this intersection contain the Florida Cracker Trail. US 98 joins US 27 and SR 700 joins SR 25 in an overlap. Along this segment, the routes run towards the north-northwest then curves more to the northwest and eventually enters Sebring somewhere between Oak Circle and Fortune Boulevard. The closest representation to a major intersection is just after Highlands Regional Medical Center, and is known as Sebring Parkway which not only serves as a segment of Highlands County Road 17A but also as a truck route of the upcoming Florida State Road 17. The routes curve to the left as they approach the intersections with Sebring Drive and Lakeview Drive, both of which were part of mainline Florida State Road 17 a route that at one time was also a hidden state road for U.S. Alternate Route 27. West of SR 17, US 27/98 as well as SRs 25 and 700 run along the south side of Lake Jackson, then curve towards the northwest. Not entirely ready to leave the city limits, the road intersects Schumaker Boulevard and the north end of the Sebring Parkway (Highlands County Road 634A). Once the routes leave the city, a frontage road runs along the southbound lanes of the collection routes. Shortly after the intersection with a minor street named Casablanca Circle US Routes 27/98 and SRs 25/700 begin to skirt the border with Avon Park. The frontage road continues along the southbound lanes until the intersection with Ponce De Leon Boulevard. The road unofficially enters Avon Park after passing near the west bank of Lake Glenda and then the South Florida State College. Curving straight north, the routes pass over a bridge over the western edge of Lake Anoka. No major intersections exist within the city until the east end of Florida State Road 64 and north end of the southern segment of Florida State Road 17. Under 15 blocks later, the road intersects another major intersection, specifically West Stryker Road on the left and both the northern termini of Highlands County Road 17A and Florida State Truck Route 17 on the right. The route curves to the northwest and leaves the city limits squeezing the CSX Auburndale Subdivision between itself and Lake Damon. Passing by the northeast shore of Lake Adelaide, the last building in the county is a recreational vehicle storage facility on the southwest corner of US 27-98 and County Line Road before SR 25 crosses the Highlands-Polk County Line.

=== Polk and Lake Counties ===
Within far-southern Polk County, the routes encounter the moderately important Avon Park Cut-Off Road, another former segment of Old State Highway 8. Avon Park Cut-Off Road branches off to the northwest, and then returns to a shared intersection with Florida State Road 17 (and former U.S. Alternate Route 27), which leaves US 27 and SR 25 again in Frostproof. North of SR 17, US 27-98 and SRs 25-700 curves from the northwest to the northeast to cross a pair of bridges over the Auburndale Subdivision before skirting the western edge of Sun Ray where it curves back to the northwest. U.S. Route 98 and hidden Florida State Road 700, turns west again in West Frostproof, thus ending the concurrency with US 27 and SR 25. This intersection is also across from the eastern segment of Polk County Road 630. Polk County Road 630A is encountered 1.8 miles (2.9 km) from its parent route followed by the Ridge Lake Airpark Community on the opposite side. The routes continue along the west bank of Crooked Lake then runs between the community of Crooked Lake Park and Warner University. The routes begin to transition away from Florida's Cowboy County as it enters Lake Wales. Within the city, development along SR 25 is mostly sparse, but includes traveler's-oriented development, such as gas stations, automotive repair shops and motels. The west side of the road includes the unfinished Longleaf Business Park, and one of the entrances to this park is across from Polk County Road 17B (Hunt Brothers Road), a suffixed alternate of SR 17. The routes run between a cemetery and a Rodeway Inn motel just before the interchange with Florida State Road 60, which was converted into a single-point urban interchange in the early-2020's for drivers along SR 60. Sparse development can still be found along the road north of there, which includes the Florida's Natural Growers headquarters and the often disaster-plagued Eagle Ridge Mall. Shopping centers and similar businesses continue to line the routes for just over a mile but eventually give way to marshland as they approach Florida State Road 540 (Cypress Gardens Boulevard) west of Waverly. At this intersection SR 540 leads west to Legoland Florida in Cypress Gardens, while Waverly Road (unmarked CR 540) leads to the namesake for the road. North of SR 540, the routes are surrounded mostly by marshland and scrub brush but sparse development resumes west of Dundee, just before the intersection with Florida State Road 542 which leads to downtown Winter Haven to the west and downtown Dundee to the east. Past the current and former SR 542s, the routes run along the western section of Lake Hamilton and the eastern banks of the lake the community was named for, then between Middle Lake Hamilton and "Little" Lake Hamilton then runs the border of northeastern Winter Haven and Haines City to intersect Florida State Road 544. Within Haines City, the routes run near the east bank of Lake Henry, then passes by the Balmoral Resorts development south of the cloverleaf interchange over U.S. Route 17/92 just before crossing another bridge over the CSX Carters Subdivision. The next major intersection is Polk County Road 17 which contains Old Polk City Road to the left and West Main Street to the right, and is a county extension of SR 17.

North of CR 17, US 27 and SR 25 becomes surrounded by scarce but noticeable suburban development, running west of Davenport and Loughman. This mix of recent suburban development and traveler's oriented development continues as it approaches a pair of bridges under Ernie Caldwell Boulevard which only contains a north-to-eastbound connecting ramp and a visitors center flanking the northwest embankment of the interchange. Two blocks later the routes encounter a more complete interchange, specifically quarter-cloverleaf interchanges on the southeast and northwest corners of the bridge over Interstate 4 at exit 55. Along the northeast corner of the interchange, US 27 and SR 25 runs along the border with Four Corners, Florida. Gradually entering more of Four Corners, the routes pass by some newly established suburban development, then intersects a pair of important, yet undesignated roads named Dean Still Road and Ronald Reagan Parkway, the latter of which leads to the ChampionsGate development. Developed areas are briefly suspended at the trumpet interchange with U.S. Route 192 (SR 530) where US 27 and SR 25 crosses the border from Polk County to Lake County, while US 192 begins by straddling the Orange-Osceola County Line. Shortly after the interchange SR 25 encounters an at-grade intersection with CR 474, although past maps have indicated another interchange here. Most of the road remains a six-lane suburban highway with at-grade intersections with at-grade intersections and cluster development. The cluster development dissipates when the routes pass by Lake Louisa State Park and winds around the eastern shores of the lake that the park was named for. Within this region, the proposed Florida State Road 516 will begin here. North of the lake, the routes enter Clermont, and the cluster development and suburban sprawl begins again, this time along the rolling hills of the Lake Wales Ridge. The north-to-eastbound off-ramp to Florida State Road 50 is detoured onto Hooks Street to Sandhill View Boulevard. Hooks Street itself is intersected by US 27/SR 25 just before the rest of the interchange with State Road 50.

SR 25 follows US 27 towards the Florida Citrus Tower in Clermont.

Continuing to hide under US 27, State Road 25 rolls along the hills of Clermont as it approaches the Florida Citrus Tower. Shortly after the tower, the routes leave the Clermont city limits and cross the border into Minneola. The city is named for Lake Minneola and US 27/SR 25 is the closest main road to that lake, but the view is blocked by development, and even some forested vacant lots. Shortly after passing city hall, the route is joined in an overlap with CR 561, The overlap with CR 561 ends south of where the routes leave the city limits for good as the road curves to the left and runs relatively parallel to Florida's Turnpike. The road moves away from the turnpike, where it will encounter some trailer parks and a motel just before the parclo interchange with Florida State Road 19 which also includes another one with Florida's Turnpike at exit 285. Until recently, exit 285 was an incomplete trumpet interchange using only a northbound off-ramp and southbound on-ramp. The routes would serve as the northern terminus of Lake County Road 565 and encounter another incomplete interchange with Florida's Turnpike at exit 289, this time a half-diamond interchange with a southbound off-ramp and northbound on-ramp.

Beyond the turnpike, US 27 takes SR 25 past communities such as "The Plantation at Leesburg," "Spanish Village" and "Highland Lakes," before officially entering the City of Leesburg. This section of the city runs east of Okahumpka as the road intersects Lake County Road 48, a tri-county road that spans from Floral City to Howey-in-the-Hills. Over a mile later, the routes encounter the northern terminus of Lake County Road 33, then the roads cross a pair of bridges over Helena Run a waterway that connects Lake Denham with Lake Harris. Just before the routes turn straight north onto a short causeway, they encounter the first Lake County Road 25A (see below) which branches off to the northwest. The US 27/SR 25 bridge over Lake Harris contains a former roadside park, which was later converted into the Leesburg Fishing Area. After the bridge ends Lake County Road 25A ends and the routes enter the heart of Leesburg where it will face the first major intersection in the city, specifically Florida State Road 44, a cross-state highway that spans from Crystal River to New Smyrna Beach. North of SR 44, the routes cross the right-of-way of the former ACL High Springs—Croom Line, which is proposed to be replaced by the Lake Denham Trail, and then intersect West Main Street (former SR 44). The right-of-way for the former High Springs-Croom Line is encountered again, and then the routes encounter Wildwood-Leesburg and Fountain Lake Trails, both of which ran along the former SAL Orlando Subdivision. U.S. Route 27 and hidden Florida State Road 25 joins U.S. Route 441 and hidden Florida State Road 500, in a convoluted intersection, and will continue their shared journey beyond the rest of Leesburg.

=== U.S. Route 441; Leesburg through High Springs ===
Still in Leesburg, US 27-441 as well as hidden SRs 25 and 500 encounter another section of Lake County Road 25A branching off to the northwest onto South Dixie Avenue. North of Leesburg, the routes pass through Fruitland Park, which includes the entrance to Lake Griffin State Park. and is the headquarters of the LakeXpress bus service. The second Lake CR 25A is encountered at North Dixie Avenue. North of Fruitland Park, the routes run through Lady Lake, but the concurrency with US 27-441 and hidden SR 500 is short-lived. Florida State Road 25 branches off of US 27-441 and hidden SR 500 at a recently built intersection and becomes Lake County Road 25. Until the early-2020's CR 25 began further south at Water Oak Boulevard, and ran onto what is today Oak Boulevard below above a flyover bridge for US 27-441 and hidden SR 500 that also ran over the right-of-way for the former ACL High Springs—Croom Line. The road runs east of The Villages as it crosses the Lake–Marion County Line at Southeast 180th Street. The route, which is now named Ocala Road continues to run in close proximity to the High Springs-Croom Line ROW even as the road curves to the northeast and enters Weirsdale at the intersection with Southeast 170th Street. It bends even more to the northeast before the intersection with Marion County Road 42. CR 25 leaves Weirsdale at the intersection with Southeast Sunset Harbor Road. North of Weirsdale, the road serves as the main route along the east shore of Lake Weir, although it's not always the closest road to the lake. It turns straight north as it enters East Lake Weir, Florida and continues to run along the lake curving west along the north side as it enters Ocklawaha where it crosses the site of the former ACL ROW then serves as both the southern terminus of Marion County Road 464C (Southeast 135th Avenue), and later the southeastern terminus of Marion County Road 464. After passing near Lake Weir Seaplane Base, the road heads northwest again just before the intersection with Southeast 119th Court. The first major intersection within the city is Southeast 92nd Loop, part of the unmarked Summerfield-Belleview Loop. The next one is the northeast end of Marion County Road 25A (see below) across from the site of the former Elks Lodge.

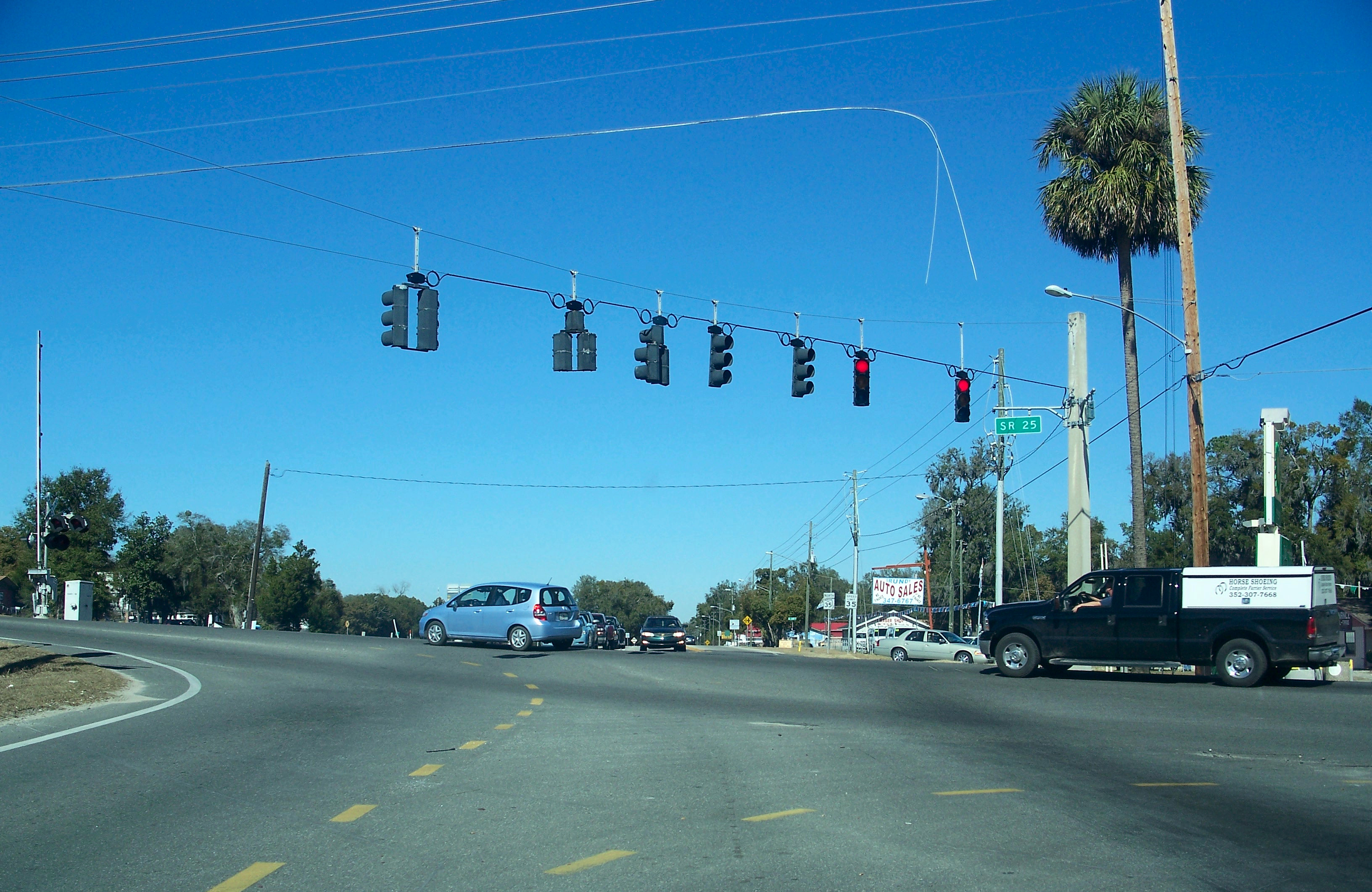
Intersection of State Road 25 with County Road 35 and State Road 35.

Only after the intersection with Southeast 110th Street does CR 25 enter the Belleview City Limits. In the city itself, Florida State Road 35 is where CR 25 ends and SR 25 is revived again just before crossing the CSX Wildwood Subdivision. U.S. Route 27 and U.S. Route 441 are encountered again, but this time with U.S. Route 301, and the intersection is also shared with Marion County Road 464. SR 25 turns north and becomes a hidden state road of US 27/301/441 again, along with hidden SR 500. North of Belleview, US 27/301/441 as well as hidden SRs 25/500 encounter the north end of the Summerfield-Belleview Loop at Southeast 92nd Place Road. Further away from Belleview, the surroundings gain more forest land as the road enters Santos where the median widens as it crosses the site of the formerly proposed Cross Florida Barge Canal just before the intersection with Marion County Road 328. The routes enter the Ocala City Limits as soon as they pass by the Ocala Twin Drive-In Theater. Before the routes fully enter the city limits of Ocala, it veers off to the left at an intersection with County Road 464A (Southeast Lake Weir Avenue), a former segment of US 441 that eventually leads to Ocala Union Station. The first major intersection after this is 31st Street. Then, it crosses under the bridge for the Wildwood Subdivision, originally built by Seaboard Air Line Railroad before reaching the city limits and the intersections with the northern terminus of CR 475 and crossing SR 464 (17th Street). A much more important intersection with US 27-301-441 as well as SRs 25 and 500 is up ahead with Florida State Road 200 (Southwest 10th Street). While Southwest 10th continues east then turns north towards Downtown Ocala, SR 200 joins this already crowded concurrency of US Routes and hidden state routes.

A total of three US Highways (27, 301, and 441) as well as three hidden state roads (25, 200, and 500) run towards the western edge of Downtown Ocala. The routes come closest to downtown at the intersection with Florida State Road 40, where the Marion County Clerk of Courts Building can be spotted on the northeast corner. Beyond this major intersection, the routes rise above a bridge over the CSX Wildwood Subdivision and a pair of railroad sidings, one of which was previously the Dunnellon-Ocala branch of the Silver Springs, Ocala and Gulf Railroad. North of that bridge, U.S. Route 27 and hidden Florida State Road 500 turn west onto Northwest 10th Street while across from this is Florida State Road 492. Hidden SRs 25 and 200 continue north along US 301 and 441. After crossing over a bridge over the Florida Northern Railroad Lowell-Candler Branch (another segment of the former High Springs-Croom Line), the routes descend from the bridge and approach the southern terminus of Marion County Road 200A (former SR 200A and US Alternate 301). Not long after the intersection with CR 200A, the routes encounter the southern terminus of another segment of Marion County Road 25A (see below). Shortly after this county suffixed alternate route, the routes leave the Ocala City Limits, running through mostly construction and industrial zoning in Kendrick and Zuber, which diminishes in the vicinity of the intersection with Florida State Road 326. Past this intersection, the surroundings become much more rural, consisting mainly of ranchland. At a remote section of Citra west of Sparr, SR 25 passes through the intersection with Marion County Road 329, the last intersection shared by US 301-441 and SR 200. Immediately after this intersection, U.S. Route 301 and Florida State Road 200 split off to the northeast at a wye interchange, while US 441 and SR 25 splits off to the northwest at the same interchange.

Now hidden exclusively along US 441, SR 25 runs east and later north of Reddick, where it intersects Marion County Road 316 and serves as the northern terminus of CR 25A. The routes then run through Orange Lake where they encounter Marion County Road 318 and McIntosh, where it passes through the McIntosh Historic District before crossing the Marion-Alachua County Line near the town of Evinston. It passes by Alachua County Road 346, a road that leads to Cross Creek before entering Micanopy, then runs across Paynes Prairie Preserve State Park and goes through Gainesville as 13th Street, serving as the eastern edge of the University of Florida campus. After intersecting SR 331 and later SRs 24A-226, the routes are surrounded by UF territory. Immediately after passing under the Helyx Bridge, State Road 24 joins US 441 and SR 25 in a brief concurrency until it reaches State Road 26 and turns east. US 441/SR 25 continues north as it becomes the western terminus of State Road 120, then intersects State Road 222, before curving to the northwest and finally joining State Road 20. From that point US 441 and SRs 20 and 25 run along the south side of the CSX Deerhaven Subdivision. Ther first street resembling a major intersection along this new segment is Northwest 53rd Avenue (Alachua CR 232), but more importantly it later intersects the multi-state Florida State Road 121. Across from the tracks, the routes run along part of the border with Alachua, and after passing by the Deerfield-Gainesville Renewable Energy Power Station, and then another segment of CR 25A, becomes enters the City of Alachua entirely. Within the city limits, SRs 20/25 and US 441 runs past the Alachua County Farmers' Market and later between the Santa Fe College Charles R. and Nancy V. Perry Center for Emerging Technologies and the Progress Corporate Park, just before climbing the embankment over the bridge over Alachua CR 2045, the west leg of the wye for the Deerhaven Subdivision and the Brooker Subdivision.

Pedestrian bridge over US 441/SR 20/SR 25 in Alachua just before the intersection with State Road 235.

Approaching the north side of Downtown Alachua, US 441 and SRs 20 and 25 run beneath a long-standing pedestrian bridge that leads to Alachua Elementary School just before the intersection with Florida State Road 235. The right of way for the High Springs—Croom Line gets close to the south side of US 441 and SRs 20 and 25 as the surroundings briefly become more rural, only to move away at the intersection with Northwest 158th Lane. The rural landscape ends as they approach Interstate 75 at Exit 399, which is an AB3-type partial cloverleaf interchange containing loop ramps on the northeast and northwest quadrants with a single south-bound on-ramp leading from southbound US 441 onto southbound I-75. US 441 and SRs 20 and 25 leave the Alachua City Limits at Northwest 188th Street. The road runs along the border with High Springs, Florida, but doesn't fully enter the city limits until Northwest 202nd Street. Florida State Road 20 breaks away from the overlap with US 441 and SR 25 to head straight to downtown High Springs where it will become a hidden state road once again, this time with U.S. Route 27. Meanwhile, US 441 and SR 25 curves slightly to the right, only to end up encountering U.S. Route 41 and the north end of hidden Florida State Road 45. Across from SR 45 is Alachua County Road 236. North of this point, US 41 and US 441 are both joined in an overlap with SR 25.

=== U.S. Route 41 to the Georgia State Line ===
Still within the city of High Springs, US 41/441 and hidden SR 25 passes by the High Springs Civic Center Park. The road continues at the same northwest angle, passing by some independent motels as it moves away from Downtown High Springs, then curves to the north away from Northwest 210th Line, a local dead-end street leading to a city board ramp, then crosses a bridge over the Santa Fe River as it crosses the Alachua-Columbia Line. Immediately after the bridge, the road cuts through the territory of River Rise Preserve State Park. North and west of the park is a dirt crossroad that would seem insignificant but is actually the Historic Old Bellamy Road, a former federal highway that spanned from Tallahassee to Saint Augustine. A side road named Southeast Sprite Lane on the east side of the routes leads to O'Leno State Park. When Southeast Sprite Lane returns to US 41-441 and SR 25, it brings the O'Leno to Ichetucknee Trail to the side of the road. Shortly after crossing the road the trail joins westbound Columbia County Road 18 and hidden Columbia County Road 238 at Southwest Fellowship Street. CR 18 joins the routes and then turns east at the intersection of Southeast Sebring Road, across from the intersection of Southwest Minter Road. Hidden CR 238 continues north along US 41-441 and hidden SR 25. The road begins to widen in Ellisville with more gas stations and restaurants as it approaches one intersection leading to All-Tech Raceway just before Interstate 75 at Exit 414, the last interchange with I-75 in the Sunshine State. Immediately after the interchange, Florida State Road 238 branches off to the east towards Lake Butler in Union County.

Leaving the travel zone area of I-75, the routes pass by Columbia County Fire Department - Station 45, which for some reason is listed on their official website as being in Fort White. North of the fire station, it has an intersection with Columbia County Road 349 then passes by a private airport knows as the Lake City Airpark The rest of what passes for major intersections along this stretch includes a blinker-light intersection with Columbia County Road 240 across from Southeast Myrtis Road, County Road 242A, which leads towards Exit 423 on I-75, County Road 133B which leads to North Florida Speedway, and a signalized intersection with County Road 252. The overlap of US 41 and US 441 splits and US 441 veers to the right along Florida State Road 25A. Meanwhile the overlap of US 41 and 441 are replaced with the overlap of US 41 and US Truck Route 441, which SR 25 continues along. Both US routes as well as SR 25 and SR 25A continue separately northbound until they enter Lake City. While in the city the routes serve as the southeastern terminus of Southwest Bascomb Norris Drive, a not-so continuous loop road around Lake City. This road while lacking a designation leads to Florida State Road 47, a state route that runs southwest-to-northeast from US 129 in Trenton. SR 47 seems to terminate at US 41 and SR 25 at the next intersection, but in fact continues as a new overlap with the routes. Closer to Downtown Lake City, US 41 and Truck 441 as well as hidden State Roads 25 and 47 intersect Florida State Road 10A at Baya Avenue, but later US 41, Truck Route 441 and hidden SR 25 intersects U.S. Route 90 (West Duval Street) where the overlap with SR 47 ends and is replaced by an overlap with Florida State Road 100.

US 41/US Truck Route 441 and hidden SRs 25 and 100 cross a bridge over the Florida Gulf and Atlantic Railroad Tallahassee Subdivision, then curve to the northwest to run parallel to the Norfolk Southern Railway Navair District, a railroad line that originated as the Georgia Southern and Florida Railway. US Truck Route 441 leaves US 41 at the intersection with Columbia County Road 100A (Northwest Bascomb Drive). A western continuation of Northwest Bascomb Drive is found later at a roundabout and SR 25 and its exposed component routes continue to the northwest where they are met from the southeast with Columbia County Road 25A (Northwest Valdosta Road), which is actually a county-extension of SR 25A just southwest of the interchange with Interstate 10 at exit 301. Due to the parallel railroad line along the east side of SR 25 and its more predominant overlapping routes, the interchange is a pair of quarter-cloverleaf ramps on the southwest and northwest corners of the underpass. North of the interchange is the intersection with CR 131 (Northwest Falling Creek Road). Slightly further north, the road serves as the address for WCJX (106.5 FM). From here it runs through small towns such as Winfield where it passes by the Columbia County Fire Department - Station 42, and later an egg farm distribution center. The last notable intersection in Columbia County is CR 246 (Lassie Black Road). Nevertheless the routes' journey within the county is not over as it passes an RV Park and a pair of Florida Agricultural Inspection Stations. The routes leaves Columbia County at the Ed Scott Bridge over the Suwannee River where they enter White Springs in Hamilton County. US 41 and SRs 25 and 100 move away from the NS Navair District past the intersection with Sunrise Drive and becomes Spring Street, which runs east to west. Two blocks later, the routes encounter the southern terminus of Hamilton County Road 135 on Third Street. Five blocks later, the road intersects Bridge Street, the south end of which is the eastern terminus of Florida State Road 136. Spring Street becomes Roberts Street and curves from west to north, but along the that curve is an entrance to Stephen Foster Folk Culture Center State Park. Here, the routes run along the western edge of the town, with the presence of the state park still in close proximity. Roberts Street ends where US 41 and SRs 25 and 100 curve to the northwest at the intersection of Southeast 165th Lane and runs parallel to the Navair District railroad line again. After the intersection with Southeast 164th Avenue and Street, another entrance to Stephen Foster State Park can be found.

The northwest to southeast trajectory for US 41 and SRs 25 and 100 ends at a semi-complex intersection with U.S. Route 129, which is also shared by hidden Florida State Road 51. However, US 41 and SRs 25 and 100 continue north along northbound US 129 and SR 51. The two US Routes and three hidden state roads briefly curve to the northwest then curve back to the north before entering Jasper. Within the city limits, the routes run along South Second Avenue East as they move closer to downtown Jasper, and joins another overlapping route. North of Hatley Street South Second Avenue East becomes the undesignated North Second Avenue East. All the routes turn left at Florida State Road 6 (Hatley Street) which becomes a county road east of this intersection. One block later, Florida State Road 51 becomes a county road and turns north onto 1st Avenue East. The intersection that follows are two lanes of Central Avenue divided by a rail-trail that was originally the Atlantic Coast Line Railroad DuPont—Lakeland Line. Immediately after the intersection with Fifth Avenue the routes bear right to the northwest as Hatley Street West becomes a local city street. Just west of the intersection with Northwest 15th Avenue and Chain Bridge Road, US 129 and SR 100 branch off to the northwest, while US 41, SR 6 and SR 25 continue west. From this point, SR 25 remains a hidden state road with only the overlap of US 41 and SR 6 exposed, even as the routes leave the city limits. West of the city line, US 41 and SRs 6 and 25 run through mostly rural residential surroundings. At 86th Boulevard, the routes curve to the northwest again before approaching the Bridge over the wetlands of the Alapaha River. The road becomes a two-lane divided highway as SR 6 branches off to the southwest while US 41 and SR 25 branch off to the northwest. Along this segment, the only intersection that seems to be of any remote importance is Hamilton County Road 152, a former state road that heads into Madison County.

The road almost curves towards the north to avoid "Old U.S. Highway 41," but then returns to the previous trajectory as it enters Jennings, where the street along these routes is given the name "Plum Street," and the first intersection to be encountered is at Hamilton County Road 141 on McCall Street. Hamilton CR 141 joins the overlap with US 41 and hidden SR 25 but more than three block later leaves to turn north onto Hamilton Street at the northern terminus of Florida State Road 143. From this point, the town limits of Jennings continue to linger along the southwest side of the road. The last structure in the state of any noteworthiness is the site of the old Jennings Florida Welcome Center. Florida State Road 25 ends at the Florida-Georgia Line, and is replaced by Georgia State Route 7 along US 41 in the State of Georgia.

== Major intersections ==
| County | Location | mi | km | Destinations | Notes |
|---|---|---|---|---|---|
| Miami-Dade | Miami | 0.000 | 0.000 | The Charter Club Entrance | south end of state maintenance |
| Miami-Dade | Miami | 0.208 | 0.335 | US 1 (Biscayne Boulevard / SR 5) to I-95 – Miami Beach | south end of US 27 overlap |
see US 27 (mile 0.000-271.648), US 441 (mile 289.300-296.619)
| Lake | Lady Lake | 271.856 | 437.510 | US 27 north / US 441 north (SR 500) – Ocala, Gainesville | north end of US 27 / US 441 / SR 500 overlap; north end of state maintenance |
| Marion | Weirsdale | 276.0 | 444.2 | CR 42 – Altoona, Pedro | |
| Marion | Ocklawaha | 281.3 | 452.7 | CR 464C north | |
| Marion | Ocklawaha | 282.0 | 453.8 | CR 464 north | |
| Marion | | 287.4 | 462.5 | CR 25A west | |
| Marion | Belleview | 288.787 | 464.758 | SR 35 north – Silver Springs | south end of state maintenance |
| Marion | Belleview | 289.151 | 465.343 | US 27 south / US 301 south / US 441 south (SR 500) CR 484 west to I-75 – Dunnellon | south end of US 27 / US 301 / US 441 / SR 500 overlap |
see US 441 (mile 308.973-401.095), US 41 (mile 408.870-478.920)
| Hamilton | Jennings | 428.594 | 689.755 | US 41 north / SR 7 north – Lake Park, Valdosta | Georgia state line |
1.000 mi = 1.609 km; 1.000 km = 0.621 mi: Concurrency terminus; Route transition

== Related routes ==
=== State Road 25A ===
State Road 25A
- Location: Lake City

State Road 25A is an unsigned designation for part of U.S. Route 441 along Marion Street in Lake City, Florida. It runs from State Road 25 south of downtown, where U.S. Routes 41 and 441 break away from each other and run parallel to each other. North of US 90, State Road 47 joins the route downtown and follows SR 25A in a hidden concurrency. North of County Road 100A, SR 25A splits from US 441 at the intersection of County Road 250 and branches off to the northwest onto North Valdosta Road where it becomes County Road 25A. The road runs in a straight northwest to southeast trajectory until it curves to the southwest and terminates at US 41/SR 25/SR 100 just south of the interchange with I-10.

=== County Road 25A (Lake County) ===
County Road 25A
- Location: Leesburg-Fruitland Park

County Road 25A is a pair of county suffixed alternate of SR 25. The first segment is entirely in Leesburg along the eastern shores of Lake Denham on the west side of U.S. Route 27 and Singletary Park beginning one mile north of the northern terminus of CR 33, and ending 0.7 miles south of the intersection with State Road 44.

The second section also begins at US 27 in Leesburg, but here it also has the concurrency with U.S. Route 441. Like the one further south, it runs along the west side of the parent route but this segment enters Fruitland Park. The northern terminus is at US 27-441 in Fruitland Park just south of the intersection with Cook Street and Register Road.

=== County Road 25A (Belleview) ===
County Road 25A
- Location: Belleview

County Road 25A in Belleview, Florida is the first of two county suffixed alternate of SR 25. The road runs east and west between US 27/441 (SR 500) and County Road 25 in Belleview, just before SR/CR 25 reunites with US 27/441, as well as an additional overlap with US 301.

=== County Road 25A (Ocala-Reddick) ===
County Road 25A
- Location: Ocala-Reddick

The second County Road 25A is another county suffixed alternate of SR 25, that was once part of US 441 and then ALT US 441. The road is 14 miles (23 km) long and is named Northwest Gainesville Road for its entire length.

=== Major intersections ===
The entire route is in Marion County.

| Location | mi | km | Destinations | Notes |
|---|---|---|---|---|
| Ocala | 0.000 | 0.000 | US 301 / US 441 (North Pine Avenue (SRs 25 / 200) | |
| Zuber | | | SR 326 (Northwest 77th Street) | |
| Lowell | | | CR 329 | |
| | | | CR 411 | |
| Reddick | | | CR 316 | |
| | | | US 441 (SR 25) | |
1.000 mi = 1.609 km; 1.000 km = 0.621 mi

=== County Road 25A (Micanopy) ===
County Road 25A
- Location: Micanopy

County Road 25A is actually one of two county suffixed alternates of State Road 25 in Alachua County. The first begins at US 441/SR 25 branching off of that road just to the northwest onto Southeast Tuscawilla Road. After it enters the Micanopy town limits it becomes Northeast Fist Street then turns west onto Northwest Seminary Road, which is a former segment of State Highway 329, that terminates at CR 234 when it leaves the town. CR 25A turns north onto a concurrency with CR 234 which runs turns south towards I-75 at Exit 234. CRs 25A/234 enters a portion of Paynes Prairie State Preserve where it terminates with US 441/SR 25, as CR 234 briefly turns east to join southbound US 441 until it reaches Northeast First Street.

=== County Road 25A (Alachua) ===
County Road 25A
- Location: Gainesville-Alachua

The second County Road 25A is located in eastern Alachua and northwestern Gainesville. Though geologically it runs east and west, it is technically a north and south road. It begins at US 441 (SR 25) where that route runs between the borders of both cities, and runs along a railroad line. Eventually it enters Alachua entirely passing south of a University of Florida Dairy Research Unit. It has intersections with Northwest 126th Lane and CR 237 before terminating back with US 441/SR 25.

=== County Road 25B ===
County Road 25B
- Location: High Springs

County Road 25B includes Northwest 174th Avenue, Southeast 17th Street and Northwest 222nd Street in High Springs. It begins as Northwest 174th Avenue at US 27/41, which runs east and west until it reaches Southeast 17th Street, where it turns north. Just before the intersection with a dirt road named Northwest 179th Place it curves to the northeast and becomes Northwest 222nd Street which then intersects Railroad Avenue, and the railroad line for which it is named, then finally intersects with its parent route, hidden SR 25 (US 441), which is also in a concurrency with State Road 20.

=== County Road 25A (Hamilton County) ===
County Road 25A
- Location: White Springs-Marion

County Road 25A is the northernmost county suffixed alternate of SR 25 in the state, but that route does not reunite with its parent road. It runs west from US 41 in White Springs as Camp Street then turns north onto Jackson Street only to make another left turn onto Osceola Road. From here it runs northwest along the north side of the Suwannee River running in front of two parklands, the first being the Stephen Foster Folk Culture Center State Park, and the next being the Swift Creek Conservation Area. The road eventually runs over a bridge over Interstate 75 with no access and curves right to run parallel to I-75 until it reaches the outskirts of the FDOT Truck inspection stations. After passing by the southbound inspection station, it takes another sharp turn to the west and the one last turn to the northwest, where it finally terminates at CR 132 in the unincorporated community of Marion.

=== State Road 25F (Miami-Dade County) ===
State Road 25F
- Location: Miami-Dade County

State Road 25F is an unsigned frontage road in unincorporated Miami-Dade County. It runs 1.308 miles along the northbound side of US 27/SR 25 from Northwest 170th Street to Northwest 186th Street, passing by the Caballero Rivero Woodlawn Park North Cemetery and Mausoleum.

=== State Road 25F (Hialeah Gardens) ===
State Road 25F
- Location: Hialeah Gardens

State Road 25F is an unsigned frontage road in Hialeah Gardens. It runs 0.717 miles from Northwest 95th Street to Northwest 87th Avenue along the northbound side of US 27/SR 25.

=== State Road 25S (Clermont) ===
State Road 25S
- Location: Clermont

State Road 25S is the designation given to a pair of service roads bordering the western side of the US 27/SR 50 interchange in Clermont. The roads are known as East Minnehaha Avenue south of SR 50 and Highland Avenue Frontage Road north of SR 50.

=== State Road 25S (Gainesville) ===
State Road 25S
- Location: Gainesville

State Road 25S is the unsigned designation for the service road that connects US 441 to SR 331 on the southeast side of the intersection between the two state roads in Gainesville. The road has no name, however, it was originally a segment of South Main Street and former Florida State Road 329.
