= Florida State Road 17 =

Highway in Florida, US

State Road 17
- SR 17 in red, CR 17 in blue, CR 17A and CR 17B in purple

Route information
- Maintained by FDOT
- Length: 47.086 mi (75.778 km)
- Existed: 1945 renumbering–present

Major junctions
- South end: US 27 / US 98 in Sebring
- US 27 / US 98 / SR 64 in Avon Park US 27 / US 98 near Frostproof; SR 60 in Lake Wales
- North end: US 17 / US 92 in Haines City

Location
- Country: United States
- State: Florida
- Counties: Highlands, Polk

Highway system
- Florida State Highway System; Interstate; US; State; Former; Pre‑1945; Toll; Scenic
← US 17	→ SR 18

State Road 17 (SR 17), also formerly known as U.S. Route 27 Alternate (US 27 Alt.), is a north–south state road in the U.S. state of Florida. It is split into two sections.

The road provides scenic views as it winds through the hills of the Lake Wales Ridge. Since February 16, 2005, the northern section of SR 17 has been designated The Ridge Scenic Highway.

== Route description ==
=== Southern segment ===
It runs from Sebring in Highlands County as "Lakeview Drive." When Lakeview Drive becomes Highlands County Road 634, State Road 17 branches off to the northeast onto "Ridgewood Drive" through downtown Sebring into a traffic circle that includes Center Avenue and Commerce Avenue before continuing north-northwest of the city, entering Avon Park from the east as "Cornell Street."

At a four-way stop, it turns north, at the intersection with Memorial Drive. South of the intersection, Memorial Drive is Highlands County Road 17A, while Cornell Street continues west as an unmarked local street. SR 17 follows Memorial Drive northbound until it reaches Main Street (Highlands CR 64 east of Memorial Drive), where it turns west. The road winds around the southern shores of Lake Verona, then it becomes a divided boulevard as it passes through Avon Park's downtown until it intersects US 27/98 at the eastern terminus of SR 64.

=== Northern segment ===
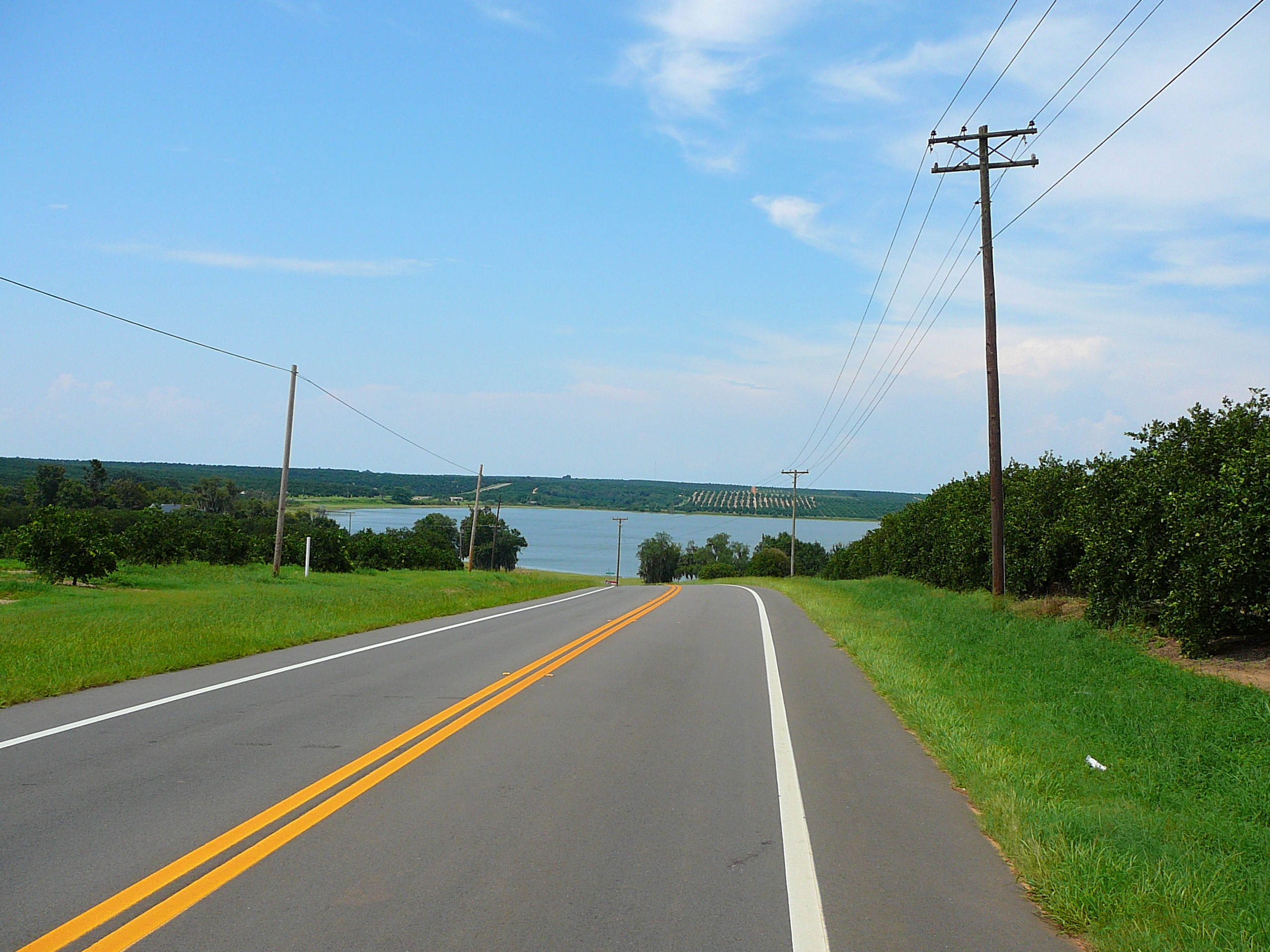
State Road 17 between Frostproof and Hillcrest Heights. Orange groves on both sides of the highway, and Lake Moody ahead.

A longer section runs from US 27/98 in Polk County, southwest of Frostproof. It bisects that town, taking the name "Scenic Highway" as it winds through Hillcrest Heights and Babson Park, the latter of which is the home of Webber International University. In Lake Wales, it runs beneath underpasses for SR 60 with access from connecting roads, and north of downtown Lake Wales passes by Bok Tower Gardens. It continues north, taking names Main Street in Dundee, where it turns north onto Center Street. Further north, it gains the names Hamilton Boulevard in Lake Hamilton, and 10th Street in Haines City, where it ends at US 17/92.

== History ==
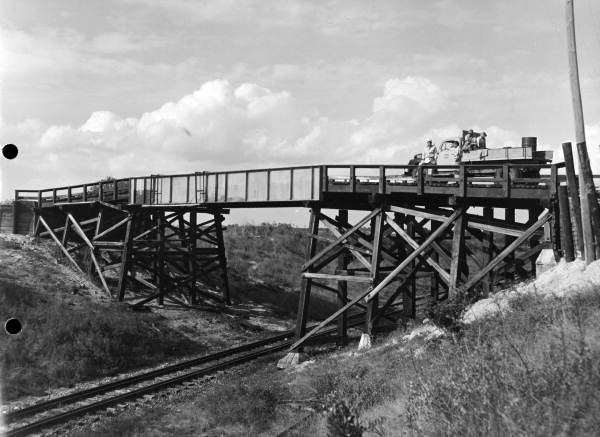
SR 17 crossing the Atlantic Coast Line Railroad Haines City Branch in Lake Placid in 1953

At its greatest extent, State Road 17 ran from Haines City as far south as northern Glades County, terminating at the present intersection of Detjen's Dairy Road and US 27 just south of Venus.

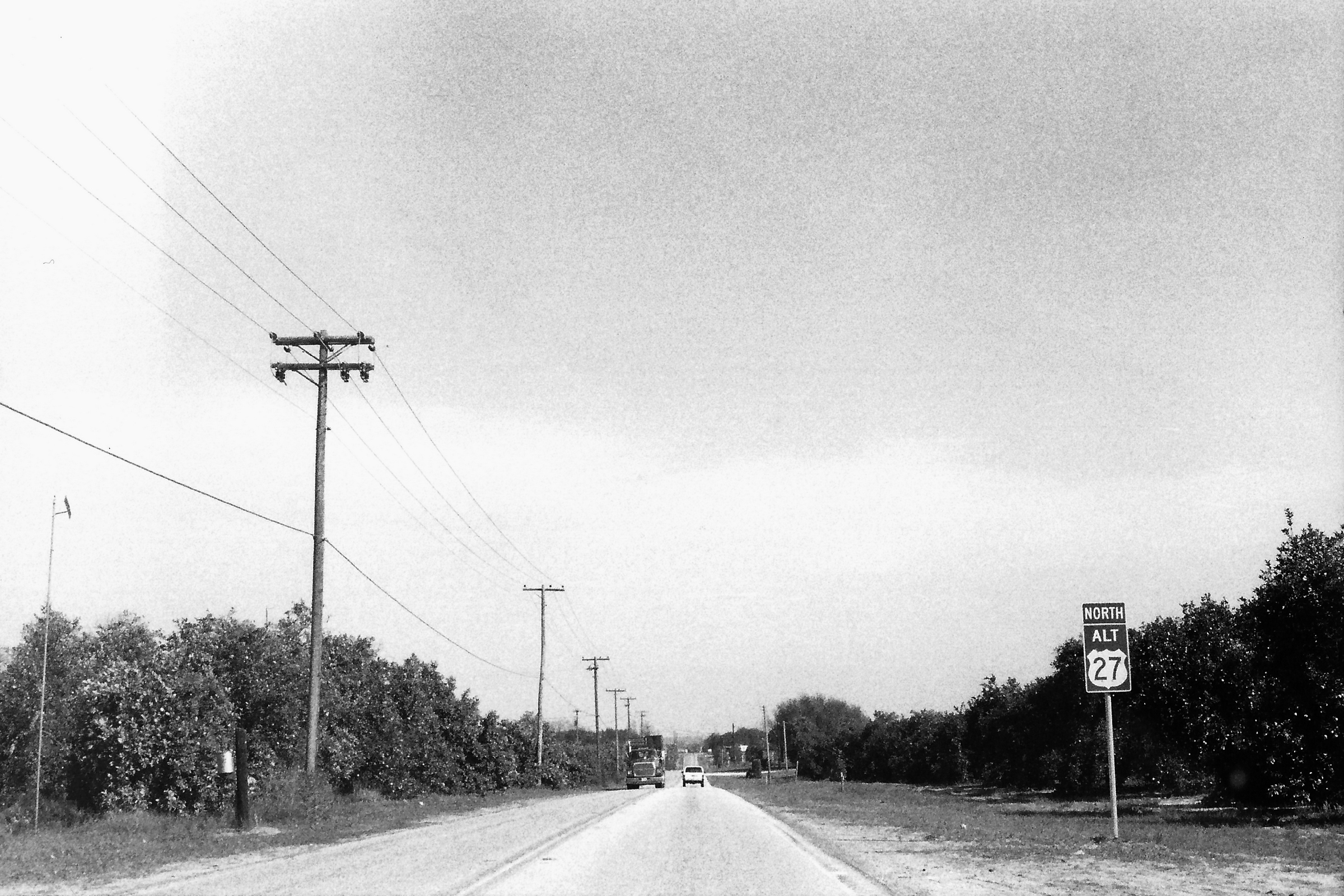
Circa 1997 black and white photograph of SR 17 somewhere in Polk County with the U.S Route 27 Alternate designation

State Road 17 was first designated in 1945 after a statewide renumbering of state roads. Prior to the renumbering, SR 17 was designated as State Road 8 from Haines City south to Childs (where it continued along present-day SR 70 east to Fort Pierce). From Childs to northern Glades County, the route was designated as State Road 67 (which continued south to Palmdale and Moore Haven along what would become SR 25). The former route of SR 17 in southern Highlands County and in Glades County is known today as "Old SR 8" (referencing its original designation) and Detjen's Dairy Road.

US 27 was extended from Tallahassee south to Miami in 1948, though much of its planned route along SR 25 between Haines City and Sebring had not yet been built at that point. As a result, much of SR 17 was designated as "Temporary US 27" until the current alignment of US 27 was completed in the late 1950s. After the completion of US 27, parts of SR 17 were designated as "US 27 Alternate", though this designation has since been removed in 1979 between Sebring and Avon Park and between the Frostproof area and Haines City 1998.

Former sections of SR 17 south of Sebring have since been relinquished to county control.

== Major intersections ==
County	Location	mi	km	Destinations	Notes
Highlands	Sebring	0.000	0.000	US 27 / US 98 (SR 25 / SR 700)	
Highlands	Sebring	1.058	1.703	CR 17 south (Kenilworth Boulevard) – Airport	
Highlands	Sebring	1.559	2.509	CR 634 west (North Franklin Street)	
Highlands	Sebring	1.78	2.86	Circle Drive	traffic circle around Circle Park
Highlands	Sebring	2.167	3.487	Sebring Parkway	
Highlands		3.962	6.376	CR 17A south (Arbuckle Creek Road) – truck route to US 27	
Highlands	Avon Park	9.705	15.619	CR 17A north – truck route to US 27 north	
Highlands	Avon Park	10.455	16.826	CR 17A south (Memorial Drive)	
Highlands	Avon Park	10.954	17.629	CR 64 east (East Main Street) – Avon Park Air Force Range	
Highlands	Avon Park	12.206	19.644	US 27 / US 98 (SR 25 / SR 700) / SR 64 west (Main Street)	
Gap in route
Polk		0.000	0.000	US 27 / US 98 (SR 25 / SR 700) / North Avon Park Cut-Off – Avon Park, Lake Wales	
Polk	Frostproof	4.213	6.780	Fort Meade Road - Fort Meade	former SR 630A west
Polk	Frostproof	6.020	9.688	CR 630 – Indian Lake Estates, Fort Meade	
Polk		14.971	24.093	CR 640 west	
Polk		17.291	27.827	CR 17B (Hunt Brothers Road)	traffic circle
Polk	Lake Wales	19.019	30.608	To SR 60 / Polk Avenue	
Polk	Lake Wales	20.285	32.646	CR 17A north (Burns Avenue) – Spook Hill, Bok Tower Gardens	
Polk	Lake Wales	21.139	34.020	To US 27 / Mountain Lake Cut-Off Road	
Polk	Lake of the Hills	23.734	38.196	CR 17A (Masterpiece Road / Chalet Suzanne Road) – Historic Chalet Suzanne	
Polk	Waverly	24.967	40.180	CR 540 (Waverly Road) to US 27 – Waverly, Winter Haven, to Cypress Gardens Boulevard (SR 540), Legoland	
Polk	Dundee	29.034	46.726	To US 27 / SR 542 / Main Street	SR 17 turns north onto Center Street
Polk	Lake Hamilton	30.297	48.758	CR 542 east (Lake Hatchineha Road) – FFA Training Center	
Polk	Lake Hamilton	31.314	50.395	CR 546 (Kokomo Road)	
Polk	Haines City	33.339	53.654	SR 544 west (Scenic Highway East) / CR 544 east (Lake Marion Road) – Winter Haven, Auburndale	
Polk	Haines City	34.880	56.134	US 17 / US 92 (Hinson Avenue / SR 600) to US 27 – Lake Alfred, Davenport	
1.000 mi = 1.609 km; 1.000 km = 0.621 mi

== Related roads ==
=== Glades County Road 17 ===
County Road 17
- Location: South of Venus

Glades County Road 17 is also named Detjen's Dairy Road. The road is a former section of SR 17 It begins at US 27 (SR 25) somewhere south of the Glades-Highlands County Line, immediately branching off to the northwest to cross the South Central Florida Express railroad line. This section of the road is the only one signed as a county road. The rest of Detjen's Dairy Road continuing as an unmarked road through the Glades-Highlands County Line. Just before the intersection with Quarters Road, the road curves from the northwest to the northeast. The road ends at CR 731 in Venus west of another railroad crossing with the South Central Florida Express railroad line.

=== Highlands County Road 17 ===
County Road 17
- Location: Lake Placid-Sebring

Highlands County Road 17 has three different locations within the county, many of which are considered to be former segments of SR 17. The first is named "Old State Highway 8," and is almost entirely unmarked. It runs from CR 731 near Venus to US 27 (SR 25) south of the town limits of Lake Placid on the east bank of the lake that bears the name of the town.

The second is South Main Avenue beginning at US 27 (SR 25) in Lake Placid running northwest of US 27. This section of CR 17 runs as a two-lane undivided road until the intersection with Poinsettia Street where it becomes a tree-lined divided two-lane boulevard. Just before the intersection with Phoenix Street, the route curves straight north. Serving as a centerpiece of downtown Lake Placid, CR 17 and Main Street have one major intersection consisting of West Interlake Boulevard which leads to Devane Park and East Interlake Boulevard (CR 17A) which takes motorists to the eastern segment of Highlands CR 621. South Main Avenue becomes North Main Avenue at this point. The divided section of CR 17 ends at Dal Hall Boulevard. North of Heartland Boulevard the route takes a sharp turn to the left where it crosses the South Central Florida Express railroad line and leaves the city limits as it turns right to run along the northeast shores of Lake June in Winter. North Main Avenue ends at CR 621 (Lake June Road) north of Lake Placid, but this segment of CR 17 joins CR 621 eastbound in an extremely short overlap before terminating at US 27.

The third version has no street name, and begins at US 27 (SR 25) north of Lake Placid The road is a two-lane highway running north through rural Highlands County as it tries to move away from US 27. One of the few notable features of the road is a bridge over Josephine Creek. North of there, the road makes a left, then right curve between two small ponds. After the intersections with Ball Street and shortly afterward Tortoise Road, CR 17 takes a long curve to left before joining a short overlap with US 98 (SR 700) north-northeast of Kuhlman. CR 17 follows westbound US 98 in an overlap along the south shore of Red Beach Lake until it branches off to the north across from Flame Drive then runs north-northeast of Red Beach Lake into DeSoto City where it crosses the South Central Florida Express railroad line, then straightens out again. The straight north and south segment comes to an end when the road curves to the right and CR 17 makes a sharp northwest turn along Kenilworth Boulevard in Sebring across the street from the western terminus of Moon Ranch Road. Turning right on Kenilworth Boulevard however leads drivers onto CR 623 which leads motorists to both Sebring International Raceway and Sebring Regional Airport. CR 17 and Kenilworth Boulevard run northwest to southeast until the segment between Industrial Way and Orange Blossom Street where it turns into a west-to-east road, Northbound CR 17 continues west along Kenilworth Boulevard, and crosses the Sebring Parkway before finally terminating at SR 17. FDOT's Highlands County map incorrectly shows the northern terminus as being at CR 634, not SR 17.

=== Highlands County Road 17A ===
County Road 17A
- Location: Sebring-Avon Park

Highaland County Road 17A also has more than one segment, most of which were originally part of former Florida State Road 17A. The first section is on East Interlake Boulevard between CR 17 (South Main Street and North Main Street), and US 27 (SR 25) in Lake Placid. East of US 27, East Interlake Boulevard becomes the eastern segment of CR 621. The segment is reportedly inventoried by FDOT as part of CR 17, but signed as CR 17A.

The second version began along the Sebring Parkway (formerly South Highlands Avenue) at US 27 / US 98 (SR 25 / SR 700) in Sebring. The road runs straight north in front of the HCA Florida Highlands Hospital, which is briefly interrupted by a roundabout for Emergency Lane. Past the Francis 2 Mobile Home Park, the route has a railroad crossing with the South Central Florida Express Railroad which runs along the west side of the parkway north of that crossing. The first intersection after this crossing is Youth Care Lane followed by the Fred Wild Elementary School. After two other minor intersections, both CR 17A and the SCXF line intersect Kenilworth Boulevard, which just so happens to be its parent route, CR 17. North of Highlands CR 17, CR 17A runs between the Highland County Fairgrounds and Sebring High School, then Sebring Parkway curves to the northwest as it crosses the South Central Florida Express Railroad a second time which ends at the CSX Auburndale Subdivision, which was crossed by CR 17A and Highland Avenue until the 2010s. At the intersection with East Center Avenue, CR 17A makes a right turn as it crosses the Auburndale Subdivision next to the Old Sebring Seaboard Air Line Depot, the city's current Amtrak station. It temporarily ends along Martin Luther King Jr. Boulevard, another former section of South Highlands Avenue.

The route begins again at the intersection of E.O. Douglas Avenue, and runs through the northeastern segment of Sebring, then leaves the city limits. The intersection of Arbuckle Creek Road is where Martin Luther King Jr. Boulevard becomes Powerline Road, CR 700A heads southeast towards US 98 in Lorida and CR 17A turns west to cross the Auburndale Subdivision again, then runs along the north and west coast of Dinner Lake before terminating at State Road 17.

The third segment begins at CR 634A (another segment of Sebring Parkway) southwest of Sebring Shores The road is known as Memorial Drive, though on some maps it is indicated as being Magnolia Drive. The road heads straight north, but curves to the northeast at Doc Sherwood Drive. Between Devonshire Road and Lake Sebring Drive, the road curves to the northwest and runs along the northwestern shore of Lake Sebring. Between Bradford Drive and Valerie Boulevard, CR 17A runs along vacant land north of the lake. North of Valerie Boulevard, the road turs straight north once again, then passes by sites such as the Lakeview Memorial Gardens Cemetery and then Memorial Elementary School just before entering Avon Park.

Soon within the city limits the route encounters a roundabout with West College Drive and Panther Parkway, then a railroad crossing with the CSX Auburndale Subdivision. Before the intersection with Lake Iola Drive, the route crosses the former right-of-way for the ACL Haines City Branch. From there the route passes a larger than average group of electrical substations on the northwest coast of Lake Lotela. The third Highlands CR 17A ends at SR 17 and East Cornell Street in Avon Park. Memorial Drive continues north as part of SR 17 until it reaches East Main Street (CR 64).

The fourth and final segment begins at SR 17 across from the intersection with Barlow Avenue east of Avon Park. This section is east of the third segment on Memorial Drive and is also a truck route of SR 17. Two large blocks later, CR 17A intersects CR 64, and though CR 64 runs as far east as Avon Park Air Force Base, East Main Street ends here. Curving to the left from Isabella Lake Road to East Old Bombing Range Road, CR 17A goes from northbound to westbound before intersecting the southern terminus of Bi-County Road 627. The road enters Avon Park at the intersection of North Tower Road, then passes by a local concrete distributor located on the right-of-way for the former ACL Haines City Branch and shortly crosses the CSX Auburndale Subdivision. Highlands County Road 17A ends at US 27 / US 98 (SR 25 / SR 700) and West Stryker Road in northern Avon Park.

=== Polk County Road 17 ===
County Road 17
- Location: Haines City

Polk County Road 17 (CR 17) exists as a sort of northern extension of SR 17. It travels northwest from the historic district of Haines City, taking the name Main Street (formerly Polk City Road). Crossing US 27, CR 17 continues northwest as Old Polk City Road until it reaches CR 557.

=== Polk County Road 17A ===
County Road 17A
- Location: Lake Wales

Polk County Road 17A (CR 17A) is a county alternate route of SR 17 in the vicinity of Lake Wales. The route begins at SR 17 in northern Lake Wales on Burns Avenue near Bok Tower Gardens where it runs east towards the fields of rural Polk County. East of the intersection with Buck Moore Road, which is also the northern terminus of Polk CR 17B (see below) the road makes a sharp curve to the northeast. At the intersection with Mammoth Grove Road, the road changes its name to Masterpiece Road and turns north, then curves to the west at the intersection with Timberlane Road. Masterpiece road curves around the north bank of Lake Starr before ending at SR 17 in Lake in the Woods, Florida, but CR 17A continues west onto Chalet Suzanne Road as it heads for U.S. Route 27.

=== Polk County Road 17B ===
County Road 17B
- Location: Lake Wales

County Road 17B (CR 17B) is another county suffixed route of SR 17 in the vicinity of Lake Wales. This route begins not at its parent route, but at U.S. Route 27 across from the Longleaf Business Park in southern Lake Wales. The road runs west to east as Hunt Brothers Road and encounters its parent route at a roundabout. The route continues to the east until it leaves Hunt Brothers Road onto South 11th Street and turns north, while the previous street it ran along continues east to the Hunt Brothers Citrus factory. Somewhere east of downtown Lake Wales the route encounters SR 60 then turns east into a short overlap with that route which ends at the north end of Hunt Brothers Road and the southern terminus of Buck Moore Road. CR 17B turns north onto Buck Moore Road and resumes a north to northeasterly direction until terminating at Polk County Road 17A. Buck Moore Road continues north until it makes a right turn onto Mammoth Grove Road.
