= List of county roads in Highlands County, Florida =

- County road shields used in Florida

Highway names
- Interstates: Interstate X (I-X)
- US Highways: U.S. Highway X (US X)
- State: State Road X (SR X)
- County: County Road X (CR-X)

System links
- County roads in Florida; County roads in Highlands County

The following is a list of county roads in Highlands County, Florida. All county roads are maintained by the county in which they reside.

== County roads in Highlands County ==
Route	Road Name(s)	From	To	Notes
CR 17	Main Avenue Kenilworth Boulevard	US 27 (SR 25) in Lake Placid US 27 (SR 25) north-northwest of Lake Placid US 98 (SR 700) / Flame Drive north-northeast of Kuhlman	CR 621 north of Lake Placid US 98 (SR 700) north-northeast of Kuhlman SR 17 / Kenilworth Boulevard in Sebring	Former SR 17
CR 17A	East Interlake Boulevard South Highlands Avenue; Sebring Parkway; East Center Avenue; Martin Luther King Jr. Boulevard; Powerline Road; Arbuckle Creek Road E.O. Douglas Avenue Memorial Drive	CR 17 in Lake Placid US 27 / US 98 (SR 25 / SR 700) in Sebring CR 17A / E.O. Douglas Avenue in Sebring CR 634A southwest of Sebring Shores CR 64 east of Avon Park	US 27 (SR 25) / CR 621 in Lake Placid SR 17 north-northwest of Sebring E.O. Douglas Avenue / School Street east of Sebring SR 17 / East Cornell Street in Avon Park US 27 / US 98 (SR 25 / SR 700) / West Stryker Road in Avon Park	Inventoried by FDOT as part of CR 17, but signed as CR 17A Former SR 17A Former SR 17A Former SR 17A Former SR 17A
CR 29		SR 70 in Bear Hollow	US 27 (SR 25) south-southeast of Lake Placid	Former SR 29
CR 64	East Main Street	SR 17 / A Miracle Avenue in Avon Park	CR 64 at the Polk County line in the Lake Wales Ridge State Forest northeast of Avon Park	Former SR 64
CR 619		CR 29 southeast of Lake Placid	CR 621 / Highlands Lake Drive east of Lake Placid	Former SR 619
CR 621	Lake June Road East Interlake Boulevard	Lake June Road / Jack Creek Drive north-northwest of Lake June in Winter northwest of Lake Placid US 27 (SR 25) / CR 17A in Lake Placid	CR 17 north of Lake Placid US 98 (SR 700) southeast of Lorida	Former SR 621
CR 623	Kenilworth Boulevard; Haywood Taylor Boulevard	CR 17 / Moon Ranch Road southeast of Sebring	Sebring Regional Airport east-southeast of Sebring	Former SR 623
CR 627		CR 17A north-northeast of Avon Park	Old Avon Park Road at the Polk County line north-northeast of Avon Park	Former SR 627
CR 634	Hammock Road Lakeview Drive; Flare Road	CR 634 in Highlands Hammock State Park west-southwest of Sebring US 27 / US 98 (SR 25 / SR 700) / CR 634 Alt. in Sebring	US 27 / US 98 (SR 25 / SR 700) in Sebring SR 17 in Sebring	Former SR 634
CR 634A	Sebring Parkway Fairmount Lane	US 27 / US 98 (SR 25 / SR 700) / Schumacher Road in Sebring Dead end in Sebring	Sebring Parkway / Avalon Road in Sebring CR 634 in Sebring	former SR 634A
CR 634 Alt.	Brunns Road; Flare Road; Howey Road	CR 634 southwest of Sebring	US 27 / US 98 (SR 25 / SR 700) / CR 634 in Sebring	
CR 635		SR 66 south-southwest of Sebring	CR 634 at Highlands Hammock State Park west-southwest of Sebring	Former SR 635
CR 640	Golfview Road, Desoto Road		CR 17A	Unsigned
CR 700A	Arbuckle Creek Road; Palms Estate Road; Live Oak Drive	CR 17A / Powerline Road north-northeast of Sebring	Ridge Lane in Lorida	Former SR 700A
CR 721		CR 721 at the Glades County line south of Brighton SR 70 east-northeast of Brighton	SR 70 in Brighton US 98 (SR 700) in Fort Basinger	Former SR 721
CR 731		CR 731 at the Glades County line southwest of Old Venus	US 27 (SR 25) east-southeast of Old Venus	Former SR 731
