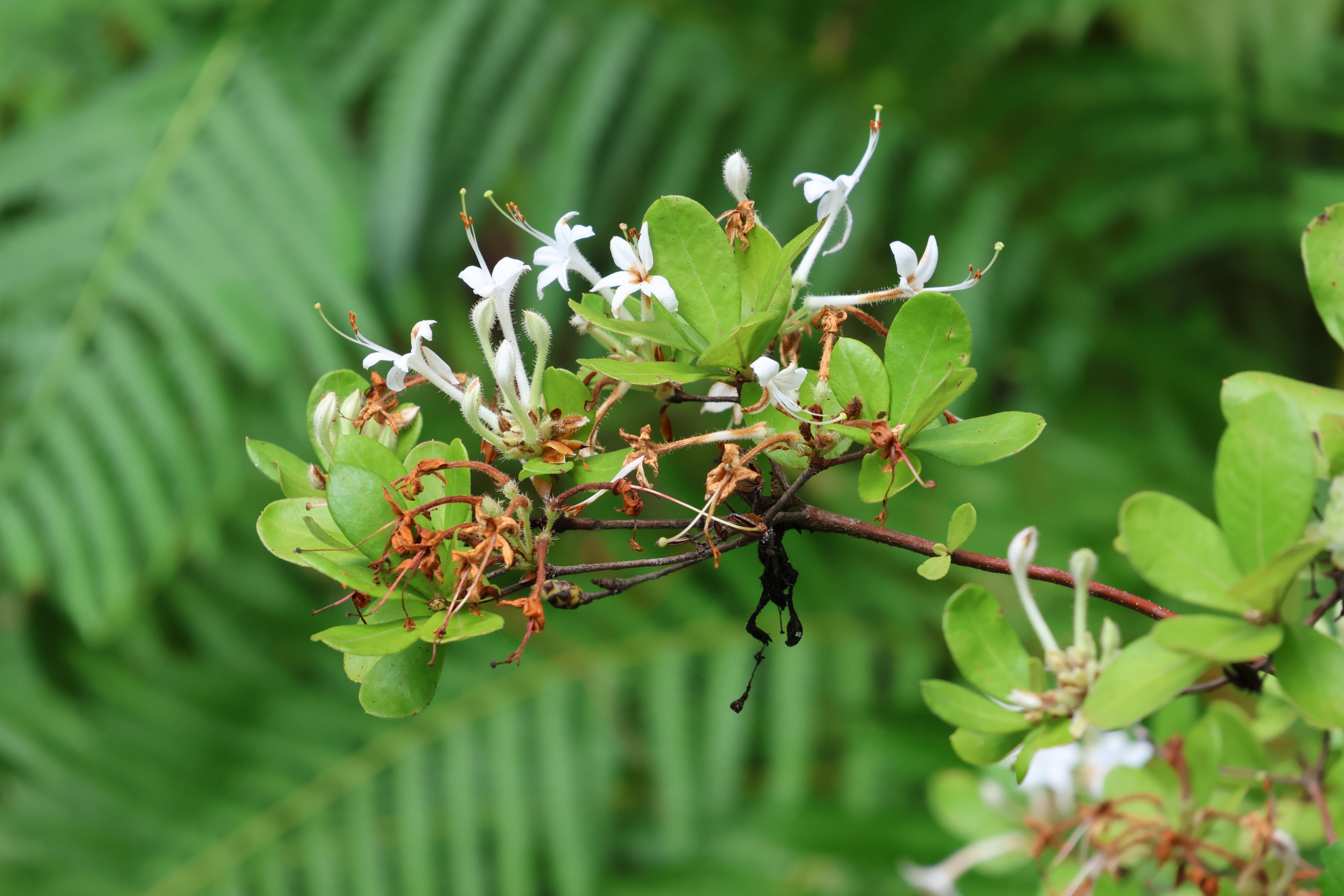
- Blooming on margins of wet hammock at Highlands Hammock

Scientific classification
- Kingdom: Plantae
- Clade: Embryophytes
- Clade: Tracheophytes
- Clade: Spermatophytes
- Clade: Angiosperms
- Clade: Eudicots
- Clade: Asterids
- Order: Ericales
- Family: Ericaceae
- Genus: Rhododendron
- Species: R. serrulatum

Binomial name
- Rhododendron serrulatum (Small) Millais

Synonyms
- Azalea serrulata Small; Azalea serrulata var. georgiana (Rehder) Ashe; Rhododendron serrulatum var. georgianum Rehder; Rhododendron serrulatum f. mollicum Rehder; Rhododendron viscosum var. serrulatum (Small) H.E.Ahles

= Rhododendron serrulatum =

Species of plant

Rhododendron serrulatum (syn. Rhododendron viscosum var. serrulatum), the hammocksweet azalea, is a species of flowering plant in the family Ericaceae. It is native to the U.S. states of Alabama, Georgia, and Florida, and possibly eastern Louisiana, Mississippi, the Carolinas, and Virginia. A deciduous shrub reaching 0.6 to 1.8 m (2 to 6 ft), it is typically found in bogs, pocosins, and wet flatwoods.
