= Norman Hall Tunnel =

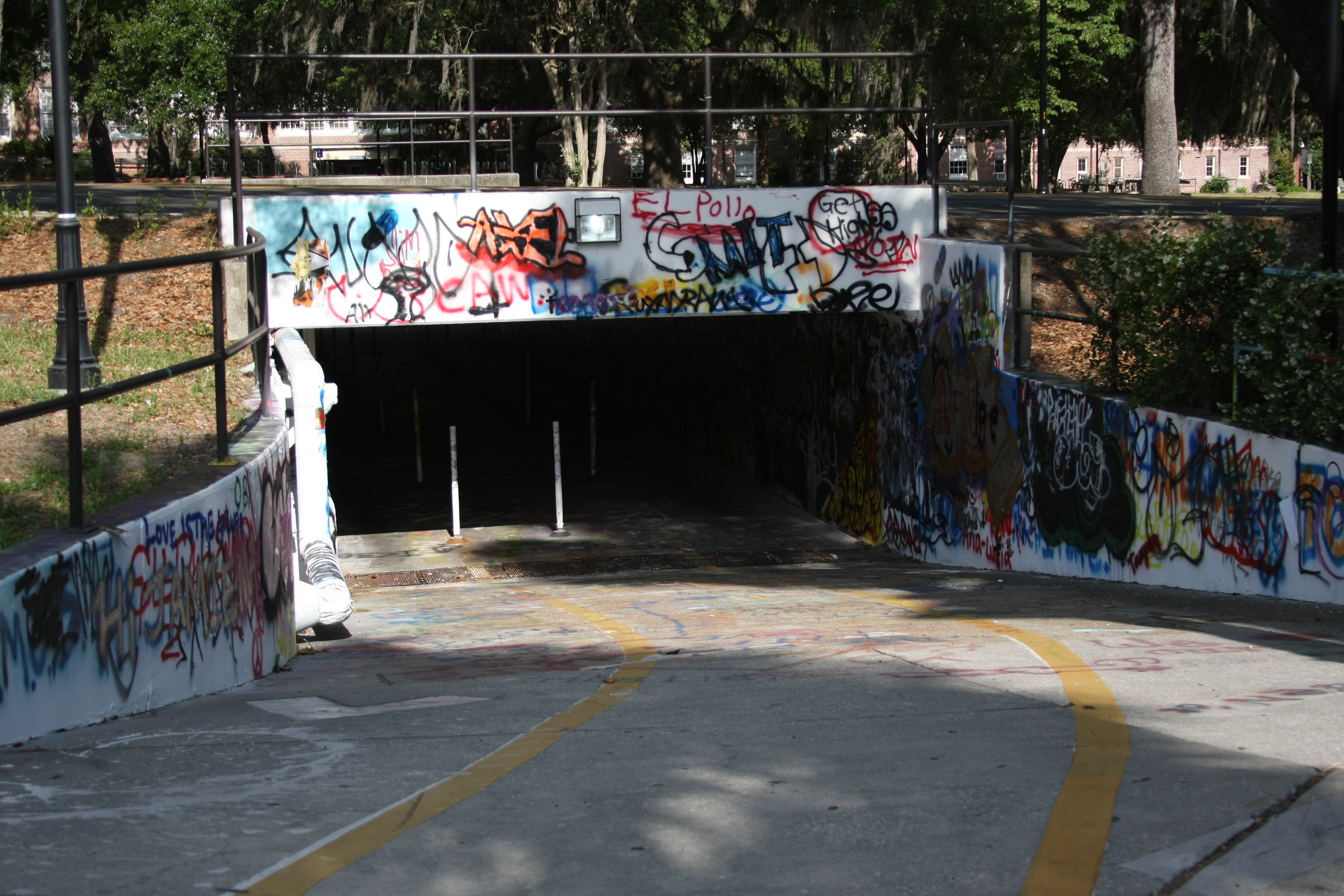
- Norman Hall Tunnel in 2009
- Interactive map of Norman Hall Tunnel

Overview
- Official name: 13th Street Underpass
- Other names: 13th Street Tunnel, Norman Tunnel
- Location: University of Florida, Gainesville, Florida
- Coordinates: 29°38′48″N 82°20′21″W
- Crosses: US 441 (13th Street)

Operation
- Owner: Florida Department of Transportation
- Operator: University of Florida

Technical
- No. of lanes: 3 (2 for cyclists and 1 for pedestrians)

Norman Hall Tunnel (also known as the 13th Street Underpass or 13th Street Tunnel or Graffiti Tunnel) is a multi-use path tunnel on the campus of the University of Florida in Gainesville, Florida. The tunnel connects the east and west side of 13th Street (U.S. Route 441), connecting Norman Hall and the main campus of the university. The tunnel is a well known site for graffiti art and photographers.

The tunnel has been opened to the public since at least 1957.

Since at least 2014, the Norman Tunnel has been criticized for its dated design (only worsened by alleged lackluster maintenance), resulting in collisions between pedestrians and cyclists going through the tunnel.

It is one of two pedestrian/cycling crossing not at-grade with 13th Street, with the other being the Helyx Bridge about a quarter mile to the south.
