= Fort Basinger, Florida =

Unincorporated community in Florida, USA

Coordinates: 27°21′46″N 81°03′10″W

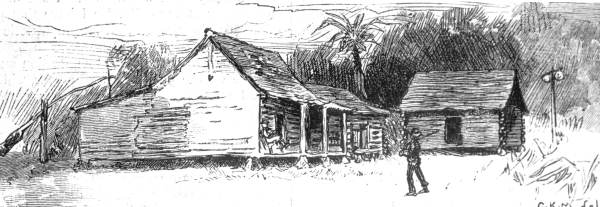
Engraving of Fort Basinger, 1883

Fort Basinger is an unincorporated community in Highlands County, Florida. The community arose around the Second and Third Seminole Wars fortification: Fort Basinger. The fort was situated 10 miles (16 km) north-west of Okeechobee. Just north of Fort Basinger is Lorida, and just above that is Sebring.
