= Sun Ray, Florida =

- Unincorporated community
- Location within Florida Location within the United States
- Coordinates: 27.7062°N 81.5593°W
- Country: United States
- State: Florida
- County: Polk County, Florida

Area
  - Total: 0.26 sq mi (0.67 km^{2})
- Elevation: 148 ft (45 m)
- Time zone: Eastern (EST)
- ZIP code: 33843
- Area code: 863

Sun Ray is an unincorporated community in southern Polk County, Florida, United States. Its area is almost entirely land; the total water area is less than 0.01 square miles (0.026 km^{2}) and most of that area is septic ponds on the south edge of Sun Ray. Approximately 90% of the community is on the east side of U.S. Highway 27. A railroad line runs diagonally south to north along the southwestern boundary of Sun Ray. Sun Ray measures 0.77 miles (1.24 km) at its longest point and 0.22 miles (0.35 km) at its widest point.

As of May 2012, Sun Ray had approximately 345 houses and an approximate population of 685. Also, the community has a United Methodist church, a produce market, two gasoline/convenience stores, a large mini-storage facility, a restaurant and a motel. Sun Ray does not have its own postal address; it is assigned to the Frostproof postal address.
