= Eagle Ridge Mall =

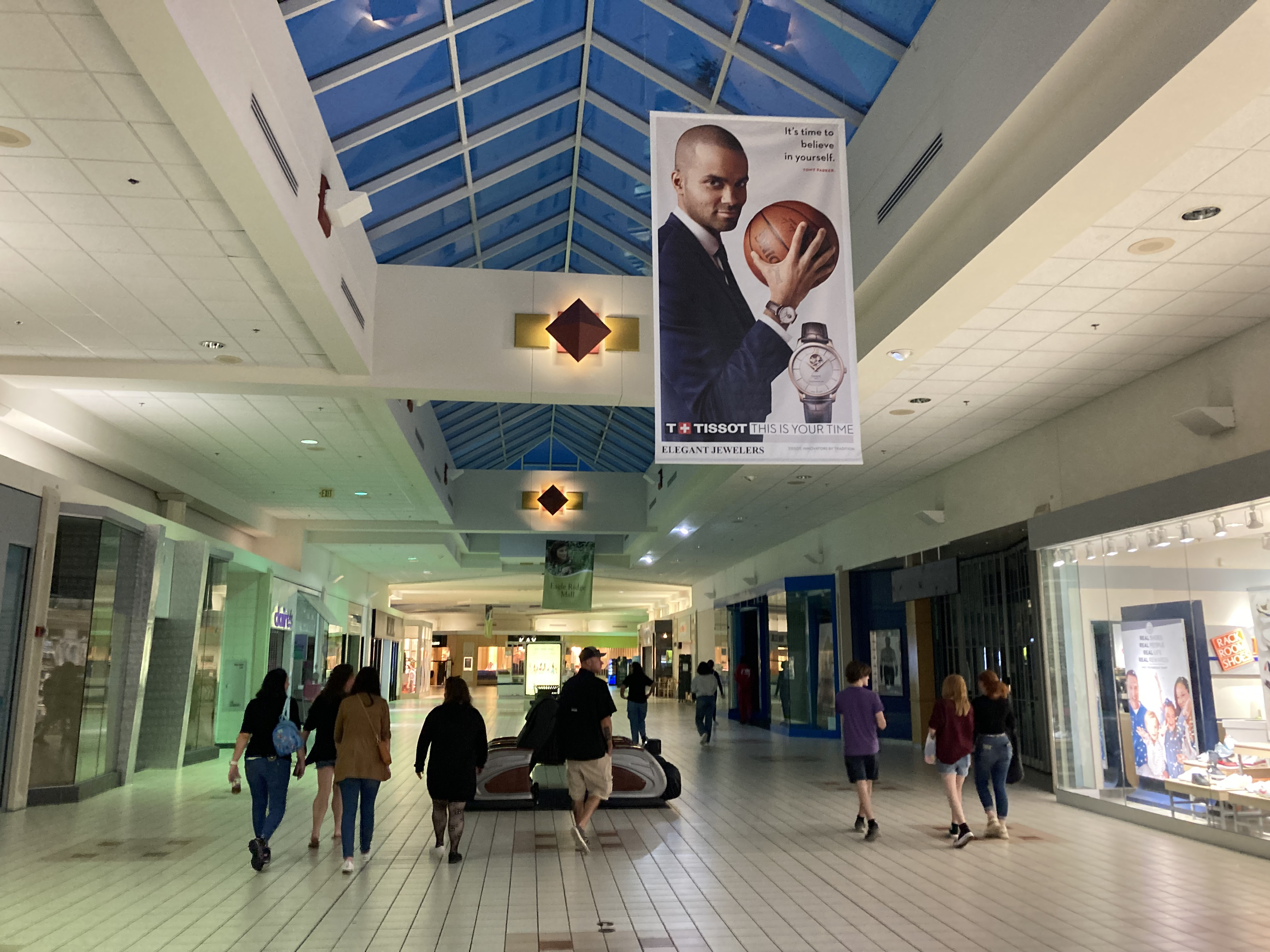
- Location: Lake Wales, Florida, United States
- Coordinates: 27.9540°N 81.6157°W
- Opened: 1996
- Developer: General Growth Properties
- Manager: Curtis Gibson
- Owner: Stockbridge Madison LLC
- Num. of stores: 89
- Num. of anchor tenants: 3 (1 open, 2 vacant by around October 2020)
- Floor area: 624,579 sq ft (58,025.3 m^{2})
- Floors: 1
- Website: theeagleridgemall.com

Eagle Ridge Mall is a regional, enclosed shopping mall located on the north side of Lake Wales, Florida, United States. It has only one anchor store: Dillard's. It also has an Escape Room X, a Regal Cinemas which has twelve theatres, and Lake Wales Bowling, a large entertainment center, which contains a bowling alley, a large video arcade, a restaurant and meeting rooms. On the north side of the mall is a large food court and a carousel. Sears relocated from the Winter Haven Mall, in nearby Winter Haven.

== History ==
In June 1998, a large sinkhole appeared in the children's play area, in the central pedestrian traffic corridor of the mall. This hole measured 80 feet (24 m) across and 14 feet (4.3 m) deep. While efforts to stabilize and fix this sinkhole were underway, a second sinkhole developed in the Sears store. These were stabilized and all areas of the mall were reopened. The publication of American Society of Civil Engineers in October 1999 contained a study detailing how these sinkholes were fixed.

In 2000, Belk had proposed to relocate to the mall from Northgate Shopping Center in Winter Haven, but instead built a store on the site of the former Winter Haven Mall after it was torn down.

In April 2009, the company which then owned Eagle Ridge Mall filed for chapter 11 bankruptcy. General Growth Properties, Inc., the mall's owner, owned 358 malls and shopping centers in forty-four states. This at the time was said to be the largest real estate bankruptcy in United States history. It was sold to Madison Marquette, and again in 2013 to Tabani Group. Sears announced closure of the Eagle Ridge Mall store in late 2016.

On June 4, 2020, JCPenney announced that it would be closing by around October 2020 as part of a plan to close 154 stores nationwide. After JCPenney closed, Dillard's became the one and only anchor store left.
