= Deem City, Florida =

- Ghost town
- Interactive map of Deem City, Florida
- Coordinates: 26.338°N 80.541°W
- Country: United States
- State: Florida
- County: Palm Beach
- Elevation: 9.8 ft (3.0 m)
- Time zone: UTC-5 (Eastern (EST))
  - Summer (DST): UTC-4 (EDT)
- Area code: 561
- FIPS code: 12-79225
- GNIS feature ID: 0293620

Deem City is a ghost town in Palm Beach County, Florida, United States, located approximately 15 miles (24 km) northwest of Weston on U.S. Route 27, near the Palm Beach/Broward county line.

== Geography ==
It is located at 26.338°N 80.541°W, with an elevation 10 feet (3.0 m).
