= Lake Moody =

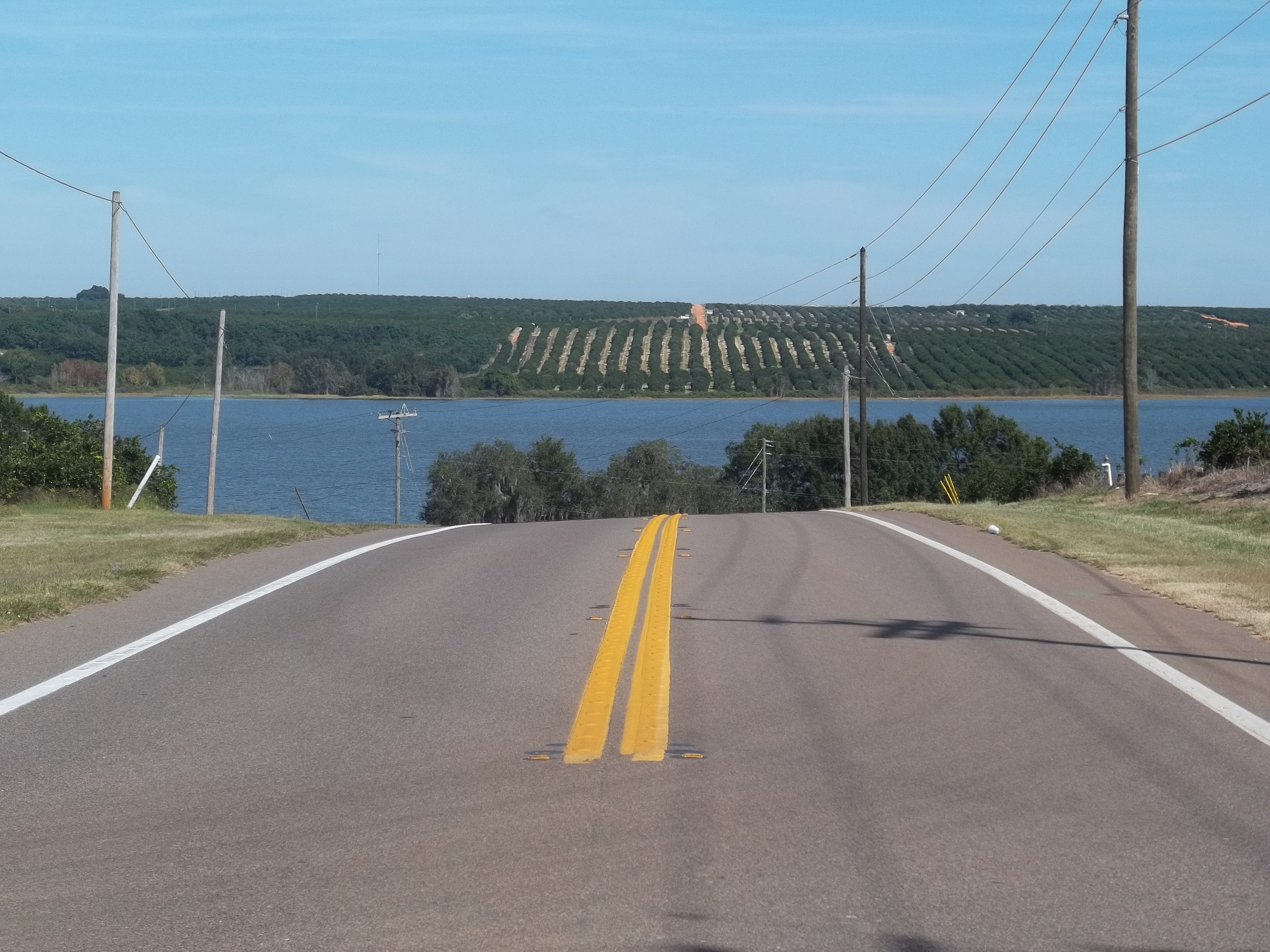

- Location within Florida
- Location: Polk County, Florida
- Coordinates: 27.7809°N 81.5315°W
- Type: natural freshwater lake
- Basin countries: United States
- Max. length: 1.04 miles (1.67 km)
- Max. width: 0.95 miles (1.53 km)
- Surface area: 409 acres (166 ha)
- Surface elevation: 92 feet (28 m)
- Islands: variable number of small islands near shore, depending on water level

Lake Moody is a natural freshwater lake with a 409-acre (1,660,000 m^{2}) surface area. Shaped somewhat like a flint arrowhead, Lake Moody is in an area of sparse residential development. A scattering of residences, as well as citrus groves, are on the south side of the lake along South Lake Moody Road. On the west side the lake is bordered by the Scenic Route of Highway 17. A few residences line the west side of the highway and the shore on west side is all private property. Most of the area along the highway is bordered by citrus groves. North Lake Moody Road borders the northwest part of the lake. The shore borders much of the road right-of-way on this road. Lake Moody is bordered on the northeast by citrus groves and some swampy areas of ground. A railroad line, more swamp and citrus groves line the east shore.

This lake is in a very hilly rural area consisting of cattle grazing land and citrus groves. The town of Frostproof, Florida, is about 0.5 miles (0.80 km) to the south and Lake Leonore is about 1,500 feet (460 m) to the northeast. This lake has no public swimming area or boat ramp. Fishing may be done along North Lake Moody Road. The Hook and Bullet website says Lake Moody contains black drum, bigmouth buffalo and Atlantic salmon.
