= Waverly, Florida =

- Census-designated place
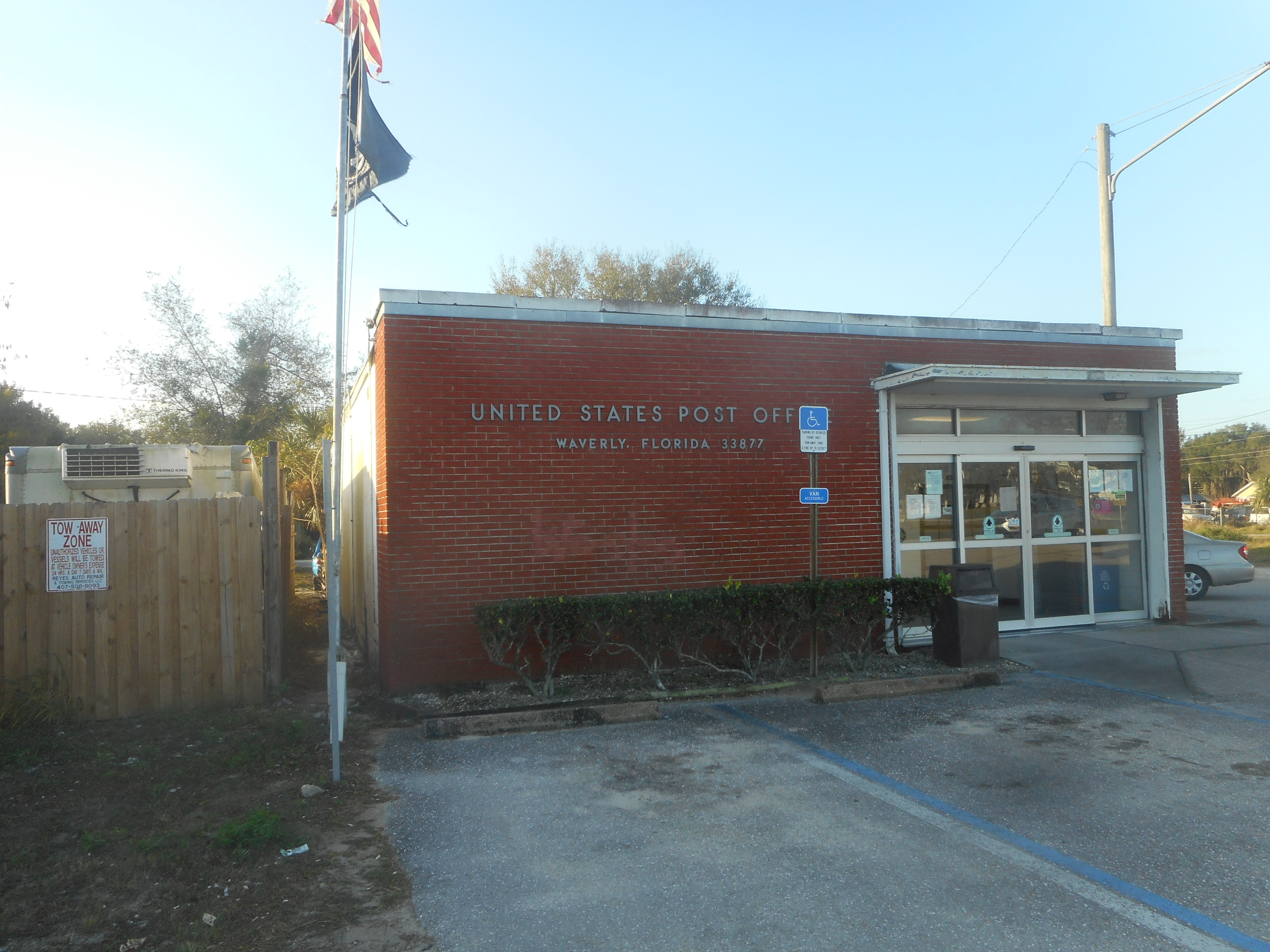
- The Waverly Post Office in January 2022

- Location in Polk County and the state of Florida
- Coordinates: 27°59′06″N 81°37′23″W
- Country: United States
- State: Florida
- County: Polk

Area
  - Total: 1.52 sq mi (3.94 km^{2})
  - Land: 1.44 sq mi (3.73 km^{2})
  - Water: 0.085 sq mi (0.22 km^{2})
- Elevation: 128 ft (39 m)

Population (2020)
  - Total: 661
  - Density: 459.6/sq mi (177.44/km^{2})
- Time zone: UTC-5 (Eastern (EST))
  - Summer (DST): UTC-4 (EDT)
- ZIP code: 33877
- Area code: 863
- FIPS code: 12-75475
- GNIS feature ID: 2402989

Waverly is a census-designated place (CDP) in east-central Polk County, Florida, United States. As of the 2020 census, Waverly had a population of 661. It is part of the Lakeland–Winter Haven Metropolitan Statistical Area .

== Geography ==
According to the United States Census Bureau, the CDP has a total area of 3.6 square miles (9.3 km^{2}), of which 3.5 square miles (9.1 km^{2}) is land and 0.04 square miles (0.10 km^{2}) (1.12%) is water.

== Demographics ==
Historical population
Census	Pop.	Note	%±
2020	661		—
U.S. Decennial Census

As of the census of 2000, there were 1,927 people, 864 households, and 603 families residing in the CDP. The population density was 543.8 inhabitants per square mile (210.0/km^{2}). There were 1,178 housing units at an average density of 332.4 per square mile (128.3/km^{2}). The racial makeup of the CDP was 69.64% White, 25.53% African American, 0.16% Native American, 0.16% Asian, 0.26% Pacific Islander, 3.06% from other races, and 1.19% from two or more races. Hispanic or Latino of any race were 4.51% of the population.

There were 864 households, out of which 15.3% had children under the age of 18 living with them, 56.6% were married couples living together, 10.2% had a female householder with no husband present, and 30.2% were non-families. 27.5% of all households were made up of individuals, and 18.5% had someone living alone who was 65 years of age or older. The average household size was 2.23 and the average family size was 2.65.

In the CDP, the population was spread out, with 18.4% under the age of 18, 5.4% from 18 to 24, 16.2% from 25 to 44, 20.9% from 45 to 64, and 39.0% who were 65 years of age or older. The median age was 56 years. For every 100 females, there were 91.2 males. For every 100 females age 18 and over, there were 87.7 males.

The median income for a household in the CDP was $23,720, and the median income for a family was $30,382. Males had a median income of $21,853 versus $24,931 for females. The per capita income for the CDP was $17,203. About 13.5% of families and 15.2% of the population were below the poverty line, including 29.6% of those under age 18 and 2.7% of those age 65 or over.
