= Highlands Hammock State Park =

State park in Florida, United States

- IUCN category V (protected landscape/seascape)
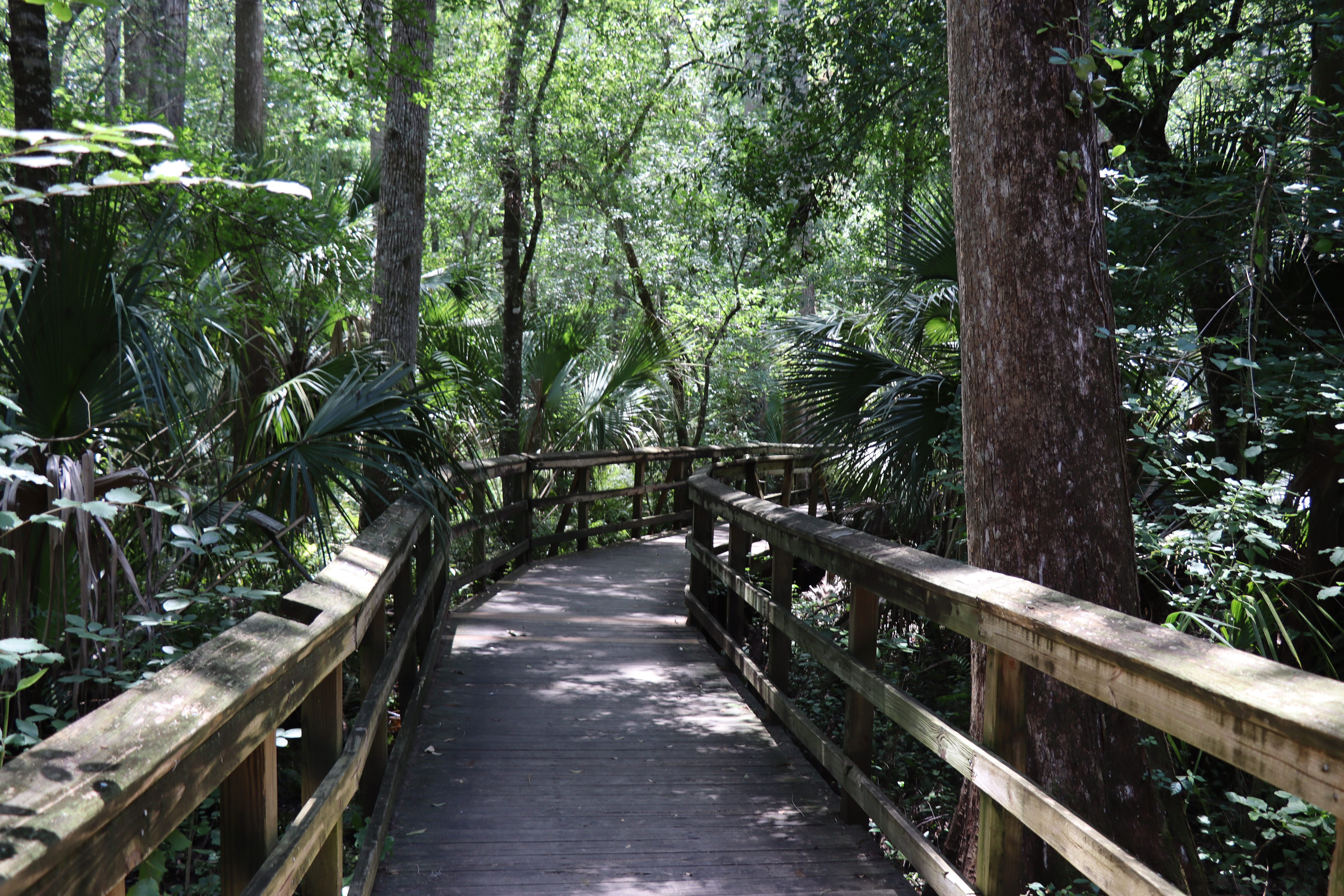
- A view of the park from the boardwalk

- Location within Florida Location within the United States
- Interactive map of Highlands Hammock State Park
- Location: Highlands County, Florida, USA
- Nearest city: Sebring, Florida
- Coordinates: 27°28′16″N 81°32′31″W
- Area: 9,000 acres (36 km^{2})
- Established: 1931
- Governing body: Florida Department of Environmental Protection

Highlands Hammock State Park is a 9,000-acre (3,640 ha) park 4 miles (6 km) west of Sebring in Highlands County, Florida, off U.S. 27. The park opened in 1931, four years before the Florida state park system was created. It was listed on the National Register of Historic Places in 2018. Part of the natural area is old-growth forest and recognized by the Old-Growth Forest Network.

== Ecology ==
=== Flora ===
Elevated boardwalks meander through an old-growth bald cypress swamp with cabbage palmettos, ferns, bromeliads, orchids and other epiphytes. Some trees are believed to be over a thousand years old, and one is possibly the largest oak in Florida, with a girth of over 36 feet (11 m).

=== Fauna ===
White-tailed deer, American alligators, gopher tortoises, frogs, otters, golden silk spiders, pileated woodpeckers, red-shouldered hawks, barred owls and Florida scrub jays are common in the park. Florida black bears, bald eagles, white ibis, gray squirrels, bobcats and the rare Florida panther are seen on occasion.

== History ==
Local citizens, concerned about plans to turn the hammock into farmland, asked the Skipper family for the property in 1931 and promoted it as a candidate for national park status, an early example of grass-roots public support for environmental preservation. One of the prime movers behind the effort was Margaret Roebling, daughter-in-law of Washington Roebling.

Though it never reached national park status, it became one of the four original Florida State Parks when the state park system was created in 1935. The Civilian Conservation Corps (CCC), established during the Great Depression, built a camp at Highlands Hammock as a headquarters, and developed additional park facilities and the beginnings of a botanical garden.

== Florida Civilian Conservation Corps Museum ==
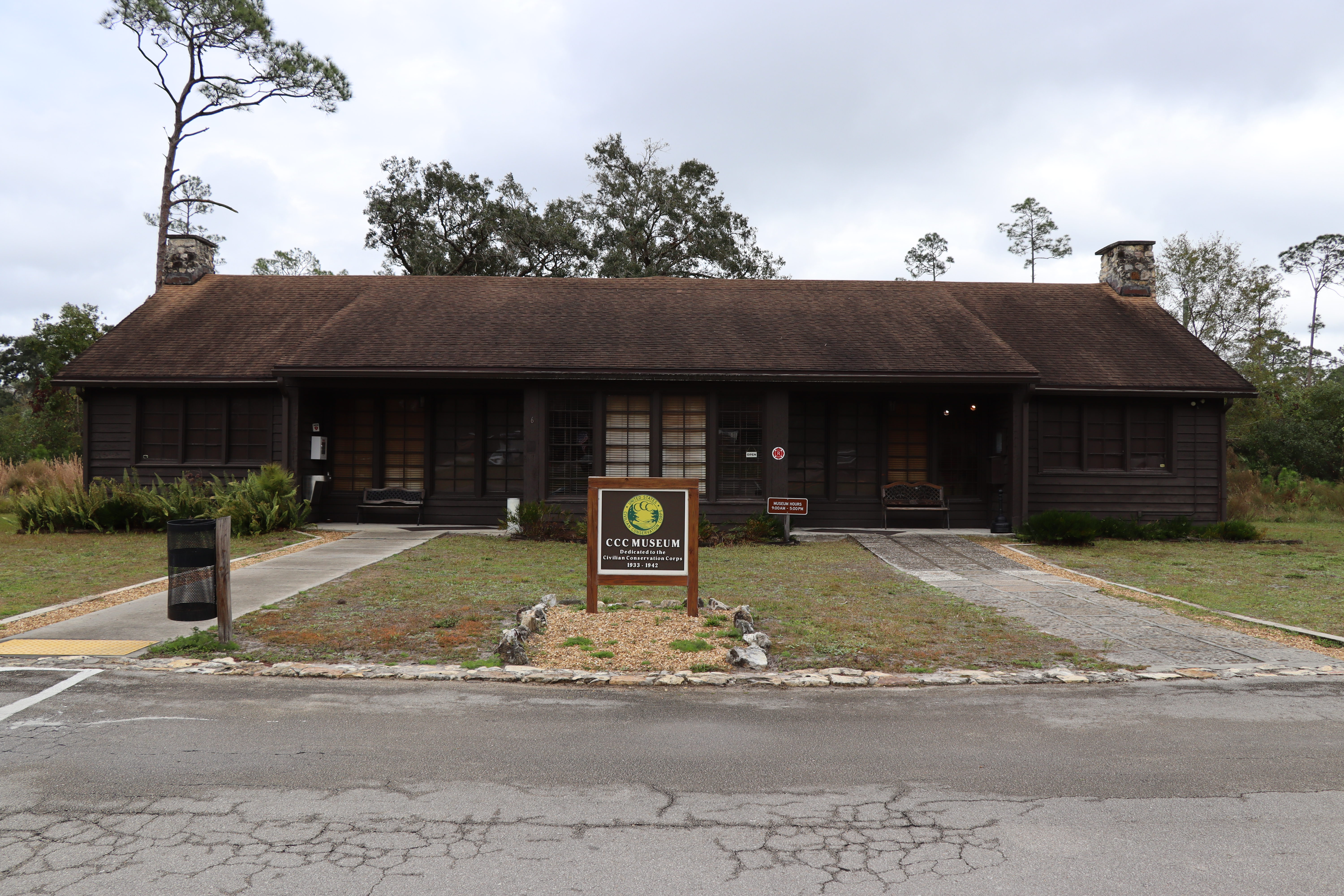
The museum in 2025

The park features the Florida Civilian Conservation Corps Museum with interactive exhibits about the 1930-1940s period of the park's construction, and the history of the CCC in Florida and the United States. The museum is located in a building constructed by the CCC.

== Recreational activities ==
The park includes a scenic three-mile (5 km) loop drive that gives access to the park's nine trails, and can be used for inline skating. An eleven-mile (18 km) trail can be traversed by bicyclists, horseback riders or wildlife viewers. Birding may also be done, since the park is part of the Great Florida Birding Trail. Ranger-guided tours are scheduled frequently.

There is a campground with water and electricity, and areas for full, primitive, and youth camping. A picnicking area is available with an adjacent playground as well as a restaurant, called "The Hammock Inn". During the fall and winter season the Friends of Highlands Hammock sponsor a Music in the Park Concert series the third Saturday of the month.

== Hours ==
Florida state parks are open between 8 a.m. and sundown every day of the year (including holidays).

== Gallery ==
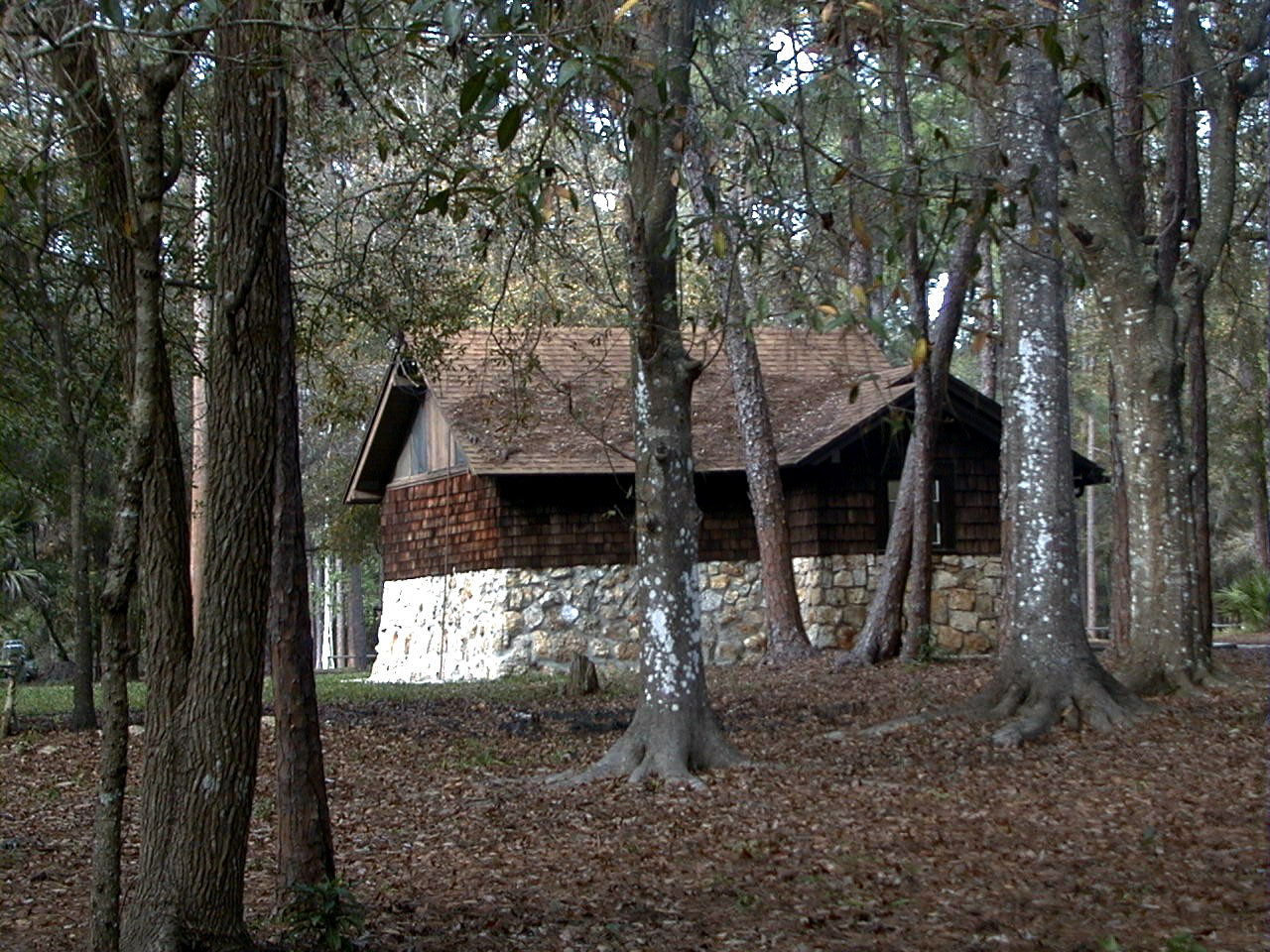
A CCC structure in the park

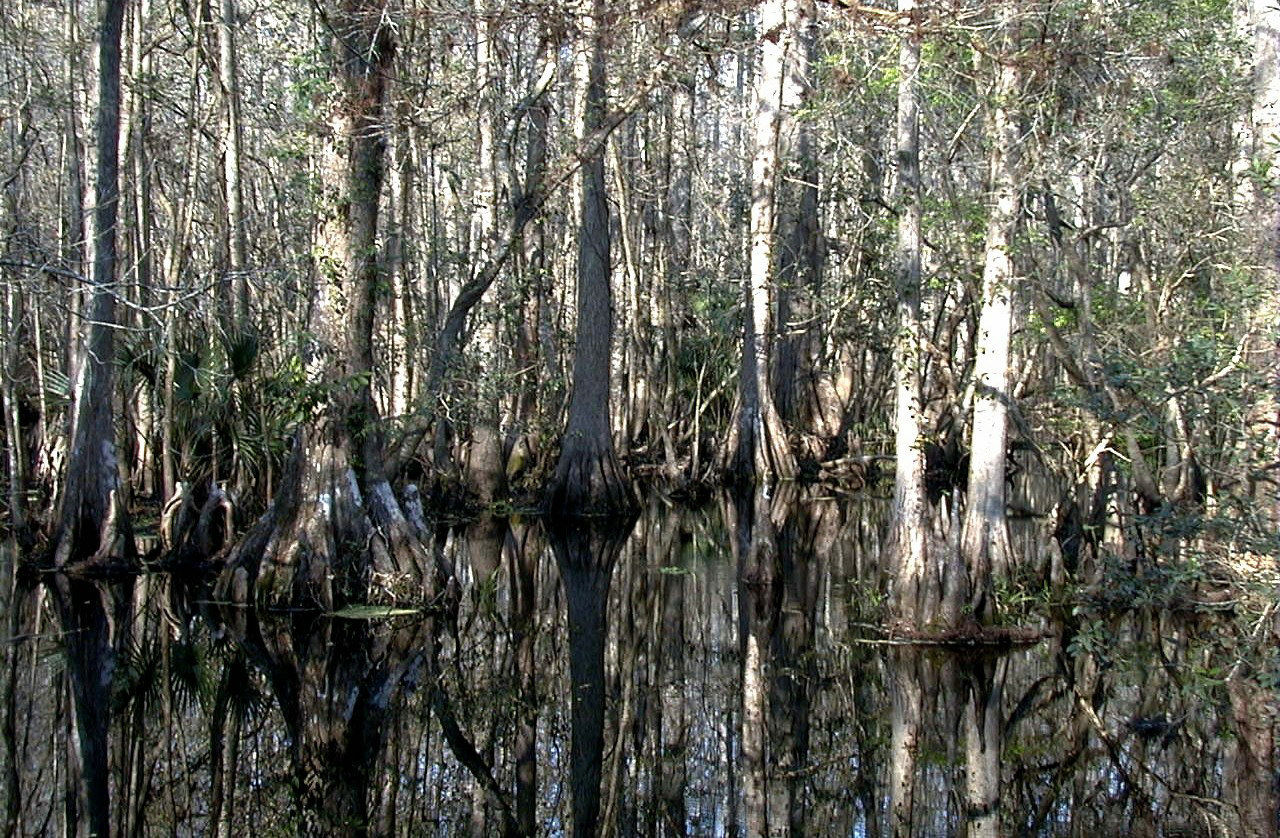
Bald cypress swamp in the park

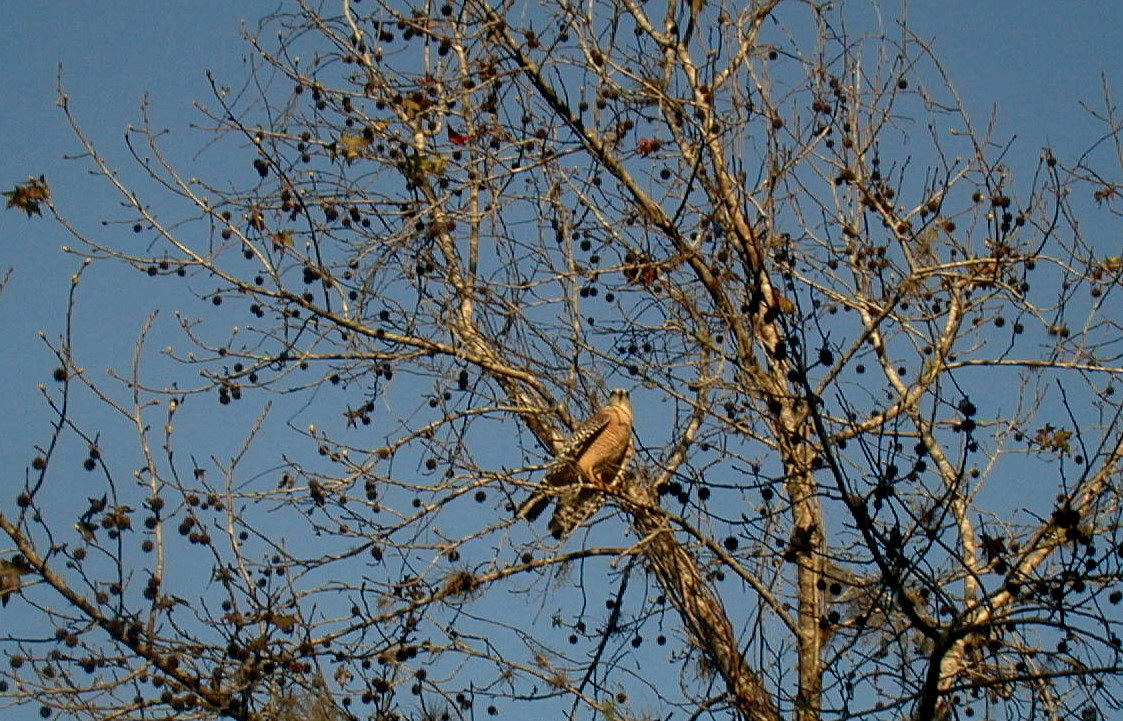
Red-shouldered hawk in the park

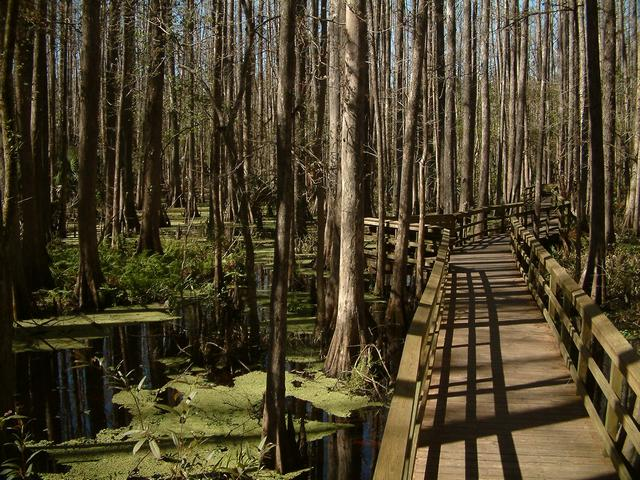
Catwalk through Bald Cypress Swamp

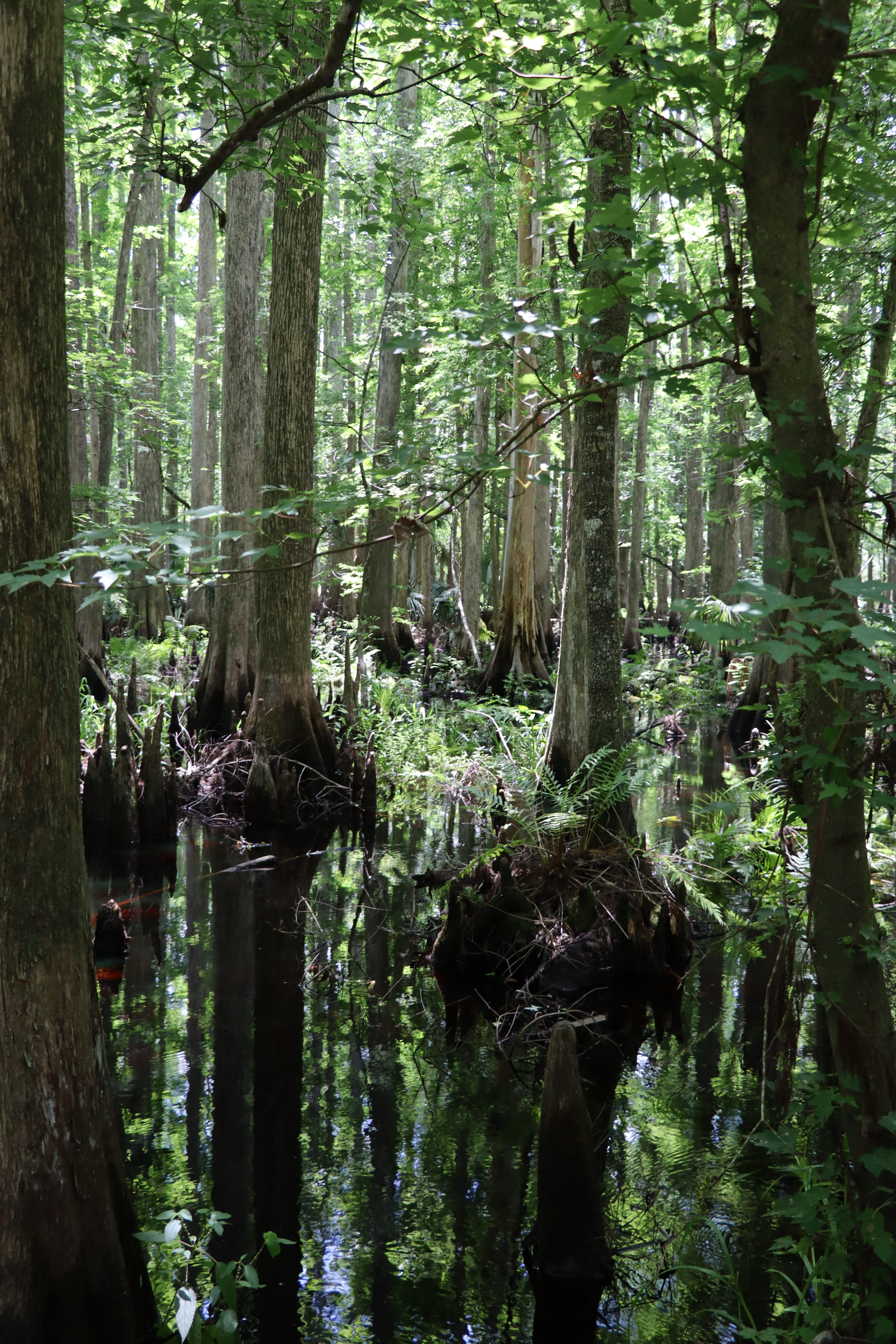
Bottoms of cypress trees

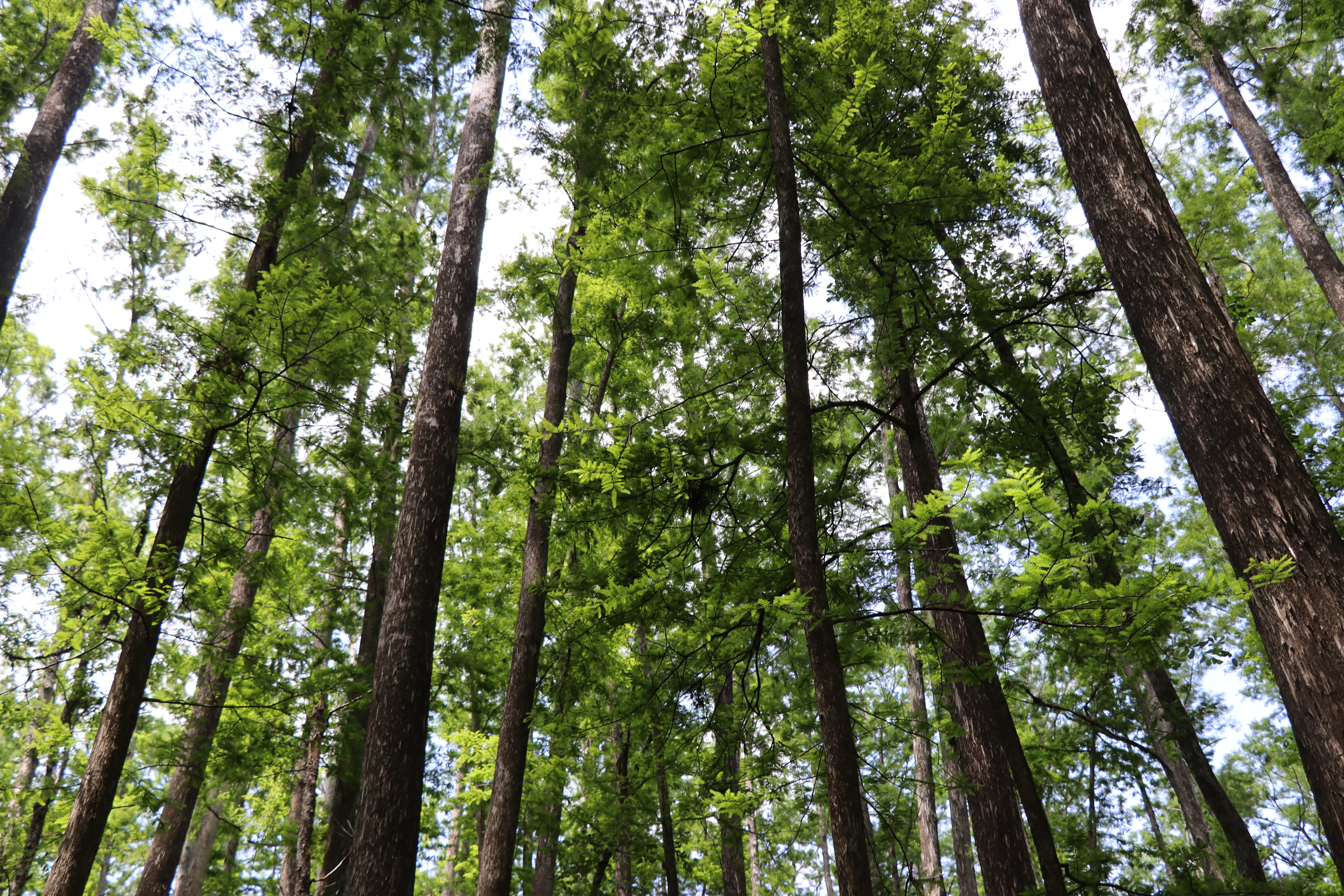
Tops of cypress trees

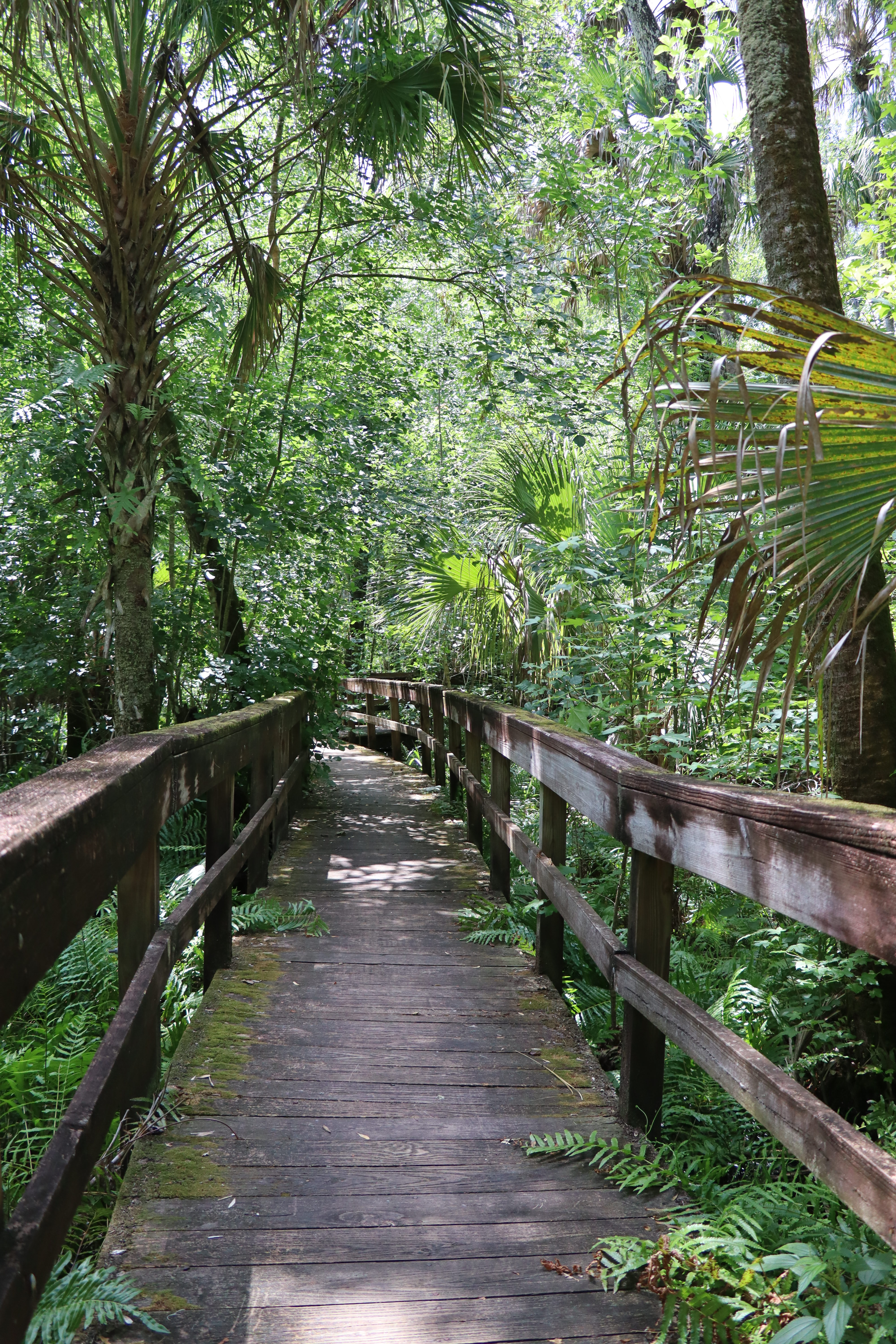
Boardwalk

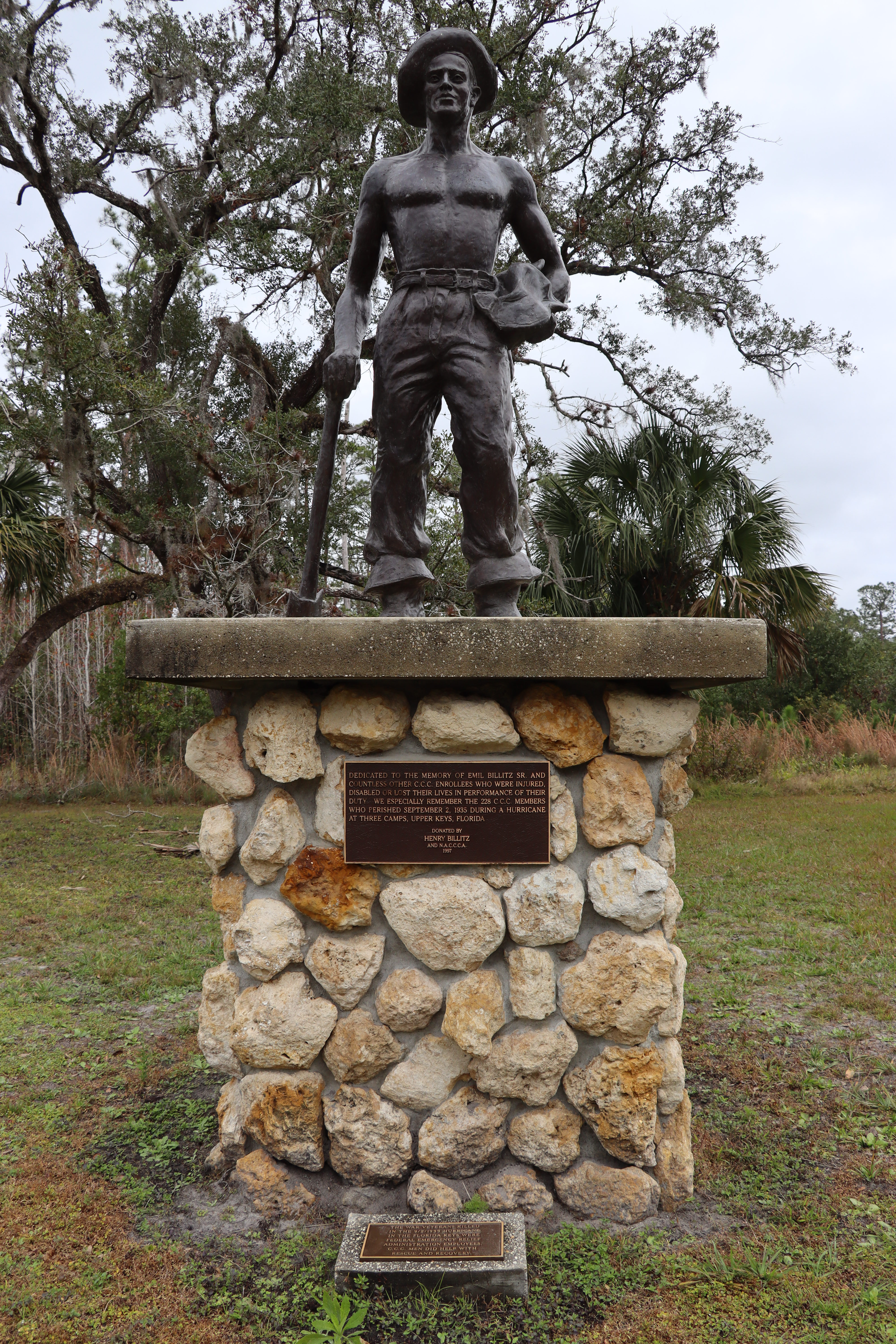
Statue for slain CCC workers

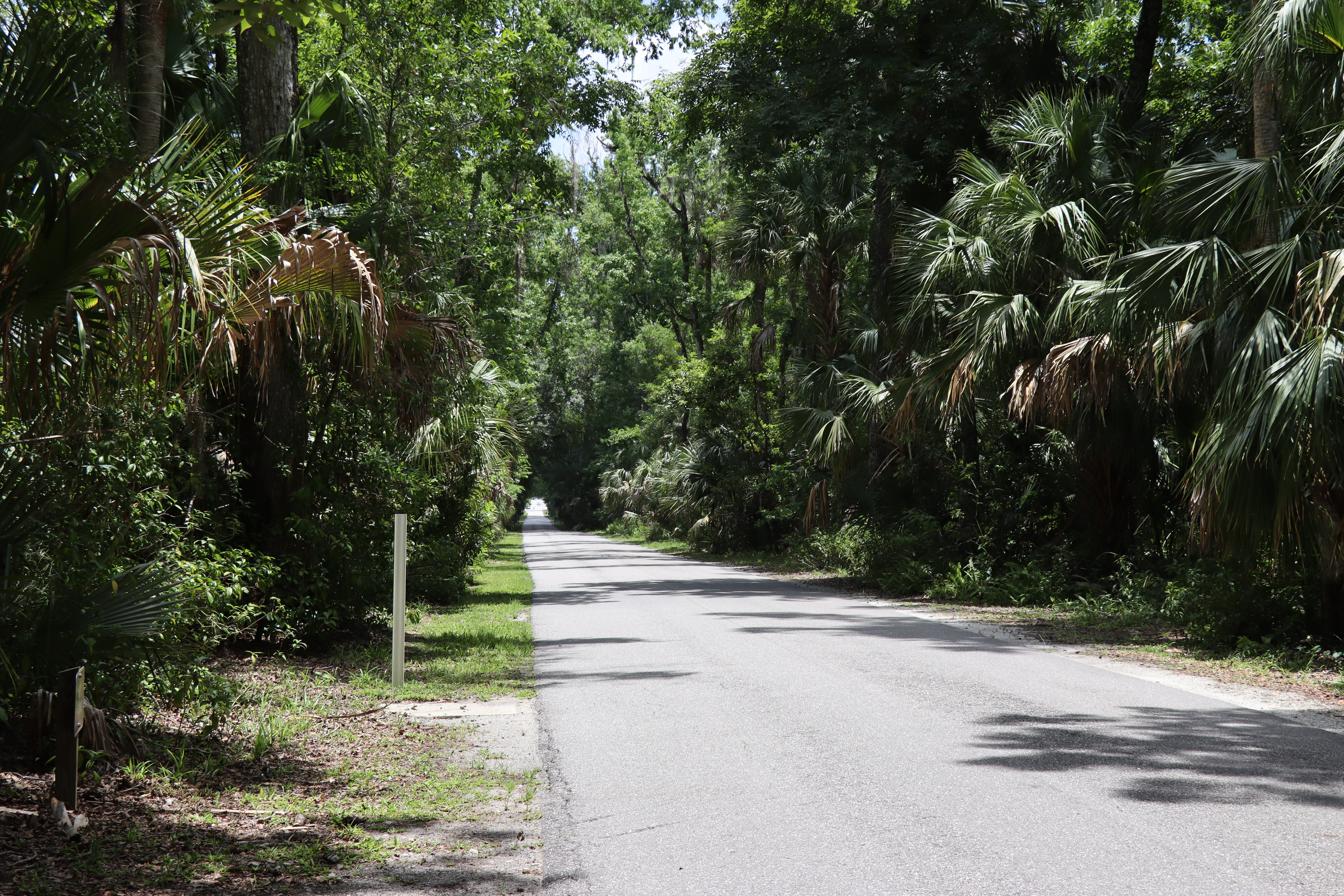
Road through the park

== See also ==
- List of Florida state parks
