= Helyx Bridge =

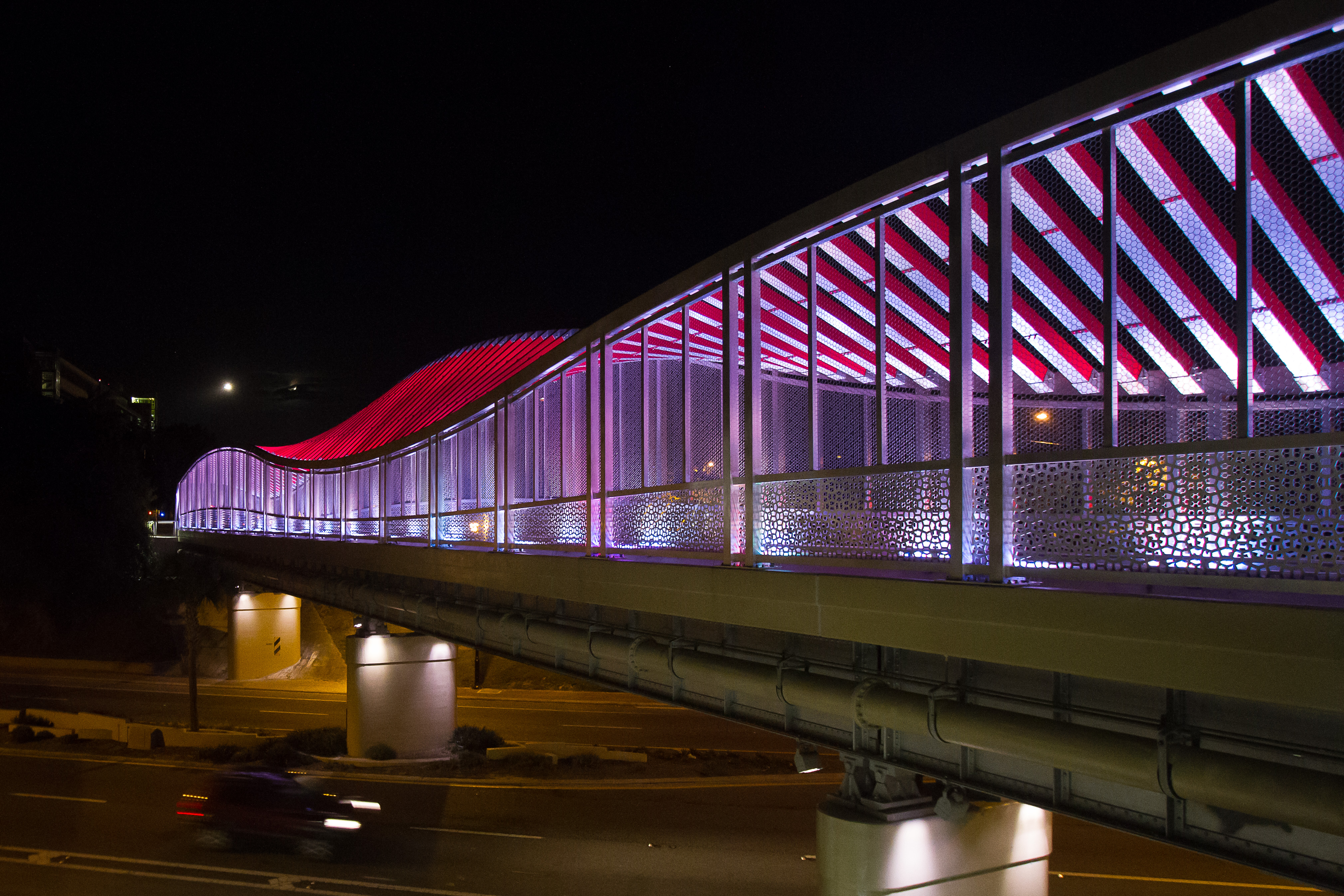
- Coordinates: 29°38′28″N 82°20′22″W
- Carries: Pedestrians, Cyclists
- Crosses: US 441
- Locale: Gainesville, Florida
- Official name: Helyx Bridge

Characteristics
- Material: Aluminum, concrete

History
- Opened: 1980s (as a rail trail), 2012 (re-opening)

Location
- Interactive map of Helyx Bridge

The Helyx Bridge, unofficially dubbed the DNA Bridge, is a pedestrian and bicycle overpass located in Gainesville, Florida. It crosses over U.S. Route 441 (US 441).

== History ==
The bridge was originally built to carry rail traffic on a line that paralleled the modern day Archer Road toward what is now the Old Gainesville Depot. Through numerous mergers and acquisitions, the line became a branch of the Seaboard Air Line Railroad. When the line was converted to a rail trail in the 1980s, the bridge was converted for pedestrian use, and a steel cage-like structure was installed. In 2009, the Gainesville Community Redevelopment Agency determined that a refresh would be needed to improve the structure's appearance and improve the image conveyed by what was a gateway to the city. In March 2012, construction started on a new design resembling a strand of DNA, with the bridge re-opening on Thanksgiving

== Design ==
When the bridge was rebuilt in 2012, it was designed as a nod to Gainesville's past as a railroad town, as well as its future in the high-tech industry and the nearby University of Florida Health Science Center. Although built to resemble a strand of DNA, the structure is not a true double helix, but instead a pair of connected sine waves 180 degrees out of phase. At night, the bridge is lit by an array of LED lights
