= Lorida, Florida =

- Unincorporated community
- Location within Florida Location within the United States
- Coordinates: 27°26′36″N 81°15′13″W
- Country: United States
- State: Florida
- County: Highlands
- Elevation: 49 ft (15 m)
- Time zone: UTC-5 (Eastern (EST))
  - Summer (DST): UTC-4 (EDT)
- ZIP code: 33857
- Area code: 863
- GNIS feature ID: 294839

Lorida (/lɒrˈiːdə/ lor-EE-duh) is an unincorporated community in eastern Highlands County, Florida, United States. It lies along U.S. Route 98 between the cities of Sebring and Okeechobee.

In addition to some light industry located along U.S. 98 corridor, Lorida and the surrounding area contains numerous fish camps and lodges on the north and east shore of Lake Istokpoga.

== History ==
Lorida was first named Istokpoga, a Seminole name, but it was afterwards changed because the U.S. postal authorities refused to accept that name, there being another post office in the state with a similar name. It was then named after an abbreviated form of Florida. Lorida, Florida has been noted for its unusual place name.

A post office was established under the name Istokpoga in 1924, and the name was changed to Lorida in 1937.

From time to time, the region has been rumored, with little evidence, to be the future home of a “Six Flags over Lorida” theme park.

== Notable natives and residents ==
- Ann Davison, first woman to cross the Atlantic Ocean by herself. During her final years, she resided in a ranch in Lorida where she raised exotic cats with her husband.
