= List of county roads in Orange County, Florida =

- County road shields used in Florida

Highway names
- Interstates: Interstate X (I-X)
- US Highways: U.S. Highway X (US X)
- State: State Road X (SR X)
- County: County Road X (CR X)

System links
- County roads in Florida; County roads in Orange County

Orange County, Florida (located in Central Florida), operates a system of county roads that serve all portions of the county. The Orange County Public Works Department, Roads and Drainage Division, is responsible for maintaining all of the Orange County roads. Most of the county roads are city streets and rural roads. There are over 2,600 miles (4,200 km) of county roads in Orange County.

The numbers and routes of all state roads are assigned by the Florida Department of Transportation (FDOT), while county road numbers are assigned by the counties, with guidance from FDOT. North-south routes are generally assigned odd numbers, while east-west routes are generally assigned even numbers.

== List of County Roads in Orange County, Florida ==
Route	Road Name(s)	From	To	Notes
CR 13		Pine Lilly Preserve	dead end	former SR 13 unsigned
CR 15	Narcoossee Road	Osceola County line	SR 528 / SR 15	former SR 15
CR 419	Chuluota Road	SR 50 (East Colonial Drive)	Seminole County line	former SR 419
CR 420	Lake Pickett Road, Fort Christmas Road	SR 50 (East Colonial Drive)	SR 50 (East Colonial Drive)	former SR 420
CR 423	John Young Parkway	Osceola County line	SR 408 (East-West Expressway)	extension of SR 423 (including a segment of former SR 423 between SR 528 and SR 482)
CR 424	Edgewater Drive, Apopka Boulevard, Old Dixie Highway			former SR 424
CR 424A	Silver Star Road, Maury Road			former SR 424A
CR 425	Dean Road			former SR 425
CR 427	Maitland Avenue	US 17 / US 92 (Orlando Avenue)	Seminole County line	former SR 427
CR 428	Michigan Street			former SR 428 unsigned
CR 431	Pine Hills Road			former SR 431
CR 435	Hiawassee Road, Apopka-Vineland Road, Mount Plymouth Road			former SR 435
CR 436A	Hall Road	University Boulevard	Seminole County line	former SR 436A
CR 437	Ocoee-Apopka Road, Binion Road, Plymouth-Sorrento Road			former SR 437
CR 437A	Ocoee-Apopka Road			
CR 438	Oakland Avenue, Plant Street			former SR 438; Part of the Green Mountain Scenic Byway
CR 438A	Kennedy Boulevard			former SR 438A
CR 439	Palm Parkway, Turkey Lake Road, Conroy Windermere Road, East 6th Avenue, Main Street, Maguire Road	CR 435 / CR 535 / SR 535	SR 50	former SR 439
CR 448	Sadler Road	Lake County Line	US 441 (Orange Blossom Trail)	former SR 448
CR 448 Truck	Jones Avenue	Lake County Line	US 441 (Orange Blossom Trail)	
CR 500A	Old Highway 441	Lake County Line	US 441 (Orange Blossom Trail)	former SR 500A (older US 441)
CR 506	Oak Ridge Road, Hoffner Avenue, Conway Road, Daetwyler Drive			former SR 506
CR 526	Bluford Avenue, Old Winter Garden Road, Washington Street	SR 50 (West Colonial Drive)	US 17 / US 92 / US 441 (Orange Blossom Trail)	former SR 526
CR 527	Orange Avenue	Osceola County line	SR 482 (Sand Lake Road)	former SR 527
CR 527A	Landstreet Road			former SR 527A
CR 530	Boggy Creek Road	Tradeport Drive	SR 528 (Beachline Expressway) / Jetport Drive	former SR 530 along Osceola County line
CR 532	Nova Road	Osceola County line	SR 520	former SR 532
CR 535	Winter Garden-Vineland Road	SR 535 south / CR 435 north / Palm Parkway	Story Road	former SR 535
CR 545	Avalon Road	US 192	SR 50	former SR 545
CR 5098	Anderson Street (eastbound), South Street (westbound)	SR 527 south (Orange Avenue)	SR 15 (Mills Avenue)	former SR 5098, earlier SR 15 until ca. 1975, when the Mills Avenue extension was built between South Street and Robinson Street (SR 526)
