= South Brooksville, Florida =

- Census-designated place
- Location in Hernando County and the state of Florida
- Coordinates: 28°32′35″N 82°23′41″W
- Country: United States
- State: Florida
- County: Hernando

Area
  - Total: 18.21 sq mi (47.17 km^{2})
  - Land: 17.91 sq mi (46.38 km^{2})
  - Water: 0.31 sq mi (0.79 km^{2})
- Elevation: 115 ft (35 m)

Population (2020)
  - Total: 4,311
  - Density: 240.7/sq mi (92.95/km^{2})
- Time zone: UTC-5 (Eastern (EST))
  - Summer (DST): UTC-4 (EDT)
- FIPS code: 12-67266
- GNIS feature ID: 1867206

South Brooksville is a census-designated place (CDP) in Hernando County, Florida, United States. As of the 2020 census, South Brooksville had a population of 4,311. It is a suburb included in the Tampa-St. Petersburg-Clearwater, Florida Metropolitan Statistical Area.

== Geography ==
South Brooksville is in the east-central part of Hernando County, located at 28°32′35″N 82°23′41″W (28.543005, -82.394738). It borders the city of Brooksville to the southwest, south, and southeast. It is in turn bordered to the south and west by unincorporated Spring Hill, and to the west by Wiscon.

U.S. Route 41 crosses the central portion of the CDP, leading north into Brooksville and south 6 miles (10 km) to Masaryktown. Florida State Road 50 crosses the northern portions of the CDP, leading east 14 miles (23 km) to Ridge Manor and west 12 miles (19 km) to Weeki Wachee.

According to the United States Census Bureau, the South Brooksville CDP has a total area of 18.5 square miles (47.9 km^{2}), of which 18.2 square miles (47.1 km^{2}) are land and 0.3 square miles (0.8 km^{2}), or 1.67%, are water.

== Demographics ==
Historical population
Census	Pop.	Note	%±
2020	4,311		—
U.S. Decennial Census

=== 2020 census ===
As of the 2020 census, South Brooksville had a population of 4,311. The median age was 53.5 years. 16.9% of residents were under the age of 18 and 31.8% of residents were 65 years of age or older. For every 100 females there were 88.0 males, and for every 100 females age 18 and over there were 89.7 males age 18 and over.

44.7% of residents lived in urban areas, while 55.3% lived in rural areas.

There were 1,900 households in South Brooksville, of which 23.0% had children under the age of 18 living in them. Of all households, 44.8% were married-couple households, 18.3% were households with a male householder and no spouse or partner present, and 29.7% were households with a female householder and no spouse or partner present. About 28.4% of all households were made up of individuals and 17.5% had someone living alone who was 65 years of age or older.

There were 2,280 housing units, of which 16.7% were vacant. The homeowner vacancy rate was 2.5% and the rental vacancy rate was 14.4%.

Racial composition as of the 2020 census
Race	Number	Percent
White	3,276	76.0%
Black or African American	497	11.5%
American Indian and Alaska Native	8	0.2%
Asian	54	1.3%
Native Hawaiian and Other Pacific Islander	2	0.0%
Some other race	123	2.9%
Two or more races	351	8.1%
Hispanic or Latino (of any race)	428	9.9%

=== 2000 census ===
As of the census of 2000, there were 1,376 people, 559 households, and 386 families residing in the CDP. The population density was 392.5 inhabitants per square mile (151.5/km^{2}). There were 636 housing units at an average density of 181.4 per square mile (70.0/km^{2}). The racial makeup of the CDP was 58.72% White, 37.35% African American, 0.15% Native American, 0.44% Asian, 1.16% from other races, and 2.18% from two or more races. Hispanic or Latino of any race were 4.36% of the population.

There were 559 households, out of which 29.0% had children under the age of 18 living with them, 43.3% were married couples living together, 20.2% had a female householder with no husband present, and 30.8% were non-families. 25.8% of all households were made up of individuals, and 14.3% had someone living alone who was 65 years of age or older. The average household size was 2.46 and the average family size was 2.93.

In the CDP, the population was spread out, with 25.9% under the age of 18, 8.6% from 18 to 24, 23.6% from 25 to 44, 23.0% from 45 to 64, and 18.8% who were 65 years of age or older. The median age was 39 years. For every 100 females, there were 84.5 males. For every 100 females age 18 and over, there were 80.7 males.

The median income for a household in the CDP was $28,073, and the median income for a family was $25,956. Males had a median income of $27,292 versus $20,938 for females. The per capita income for the CDP was $15,758. About 11.5% of families and 16.1% of the population were below the poverty line, including 16.9% of those under age 18 and 11.7% of those age 65 or over.

== See also ==
- South Brooksville Avenue Historic District
