= Cypress Lake Preserve =

Nature preserve in Ridge Manor, Florida

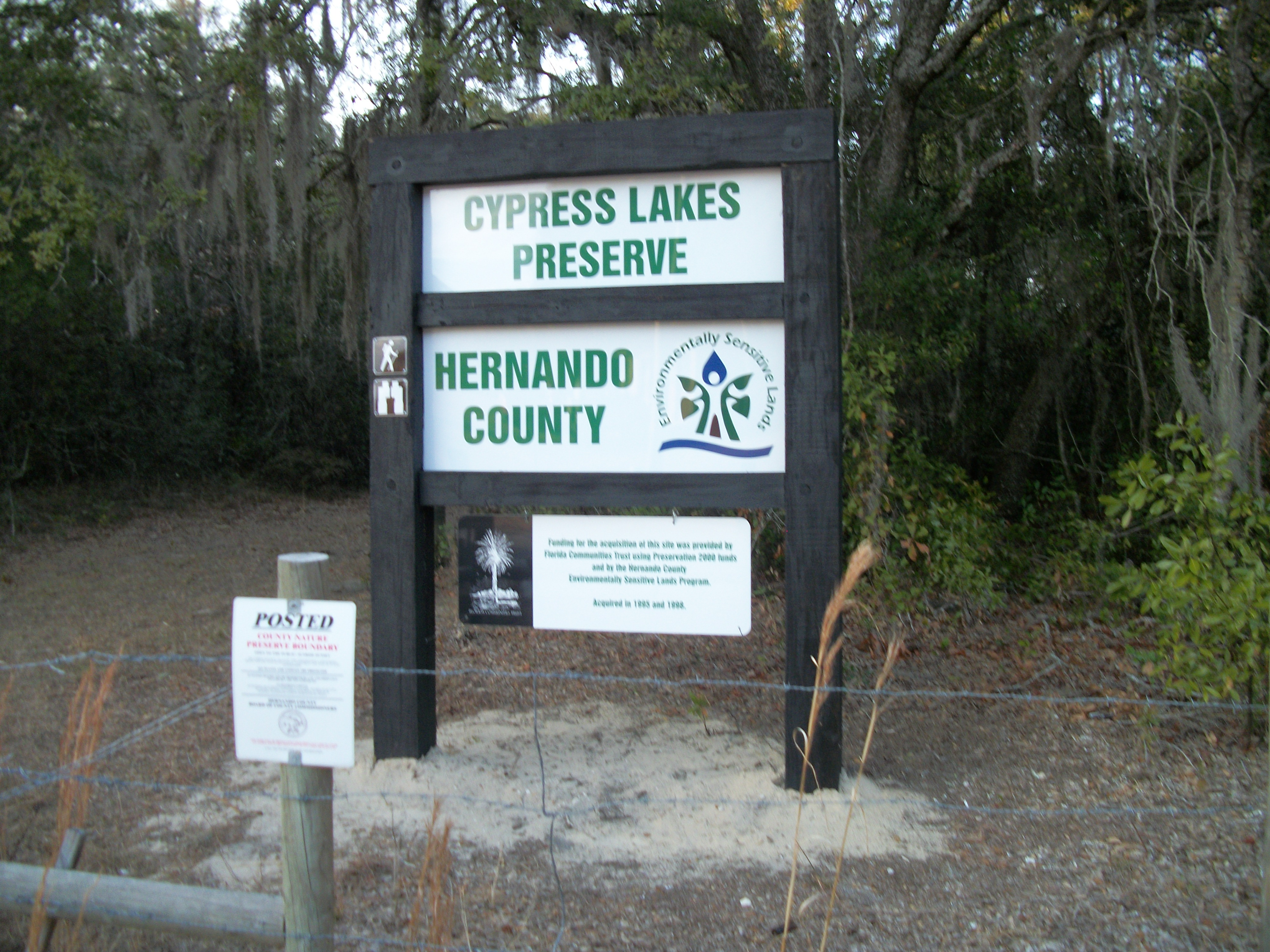
- One of two signs for the preserve. A gate and a Florida Trail entrance is to the left.

- Location within Florida
- Location: Ridge Manor, Florida
- Coordinates: 28.5169°N 82.201°W
- Area: 324 acres (1.31 km^{2})
- Governing body: Hernando County
- Website: www.co.hernando.fl.us/parks_rec/Parks/Park_detail.asp?Key=5

Cypress Lake Preserve is a 324-acre (1.31 km^{2}) nature preserve in Ridge Manor, Florida. The preserve is located in the vicinity of US 98/SR 50 and Ridge Manor Boulevard in Ridge Manor, Florida. It includes approximately 600 feet (180 m) of frontage on the Withlacoochee River and offers walking and hiking trails.

Cypress Lake Preserve has two signs. One of which is on Paul N. Steckle Drive between the Withlacoochee River and a Hernando County Firehouse, and the other on Ridge Manor Boulevard across from the intersection with Olancha Road.
