= Florida State Road 482 =

State highway in Florida, United States

State Road 482

Route information
- Maintained by FDOT
- Length: 7.813 mi (12.574 km)

Major junctions
- West end: I-4 in Doctor Phillips
- US 17 / US 92 / US 441 in Sky Lake
- East end: SR 528 in Belle Isle

Location
- Country: United States
- State: Florida
- Counties: Orange

Highway system
- Florida State Highway System; Interstate; US; State; Former; Pre‑1945; Toll; Scenic
← SR 472	→ SR 483

State Road 482 (SR 482), named Sand Lake Road and McCoy Road, is an east–west state highway in south Orlando, Florida, United States. It is a surface road providing access to some of Orlando's biggest tourist attractions.

== Route description ==
Sand Lake Road begins at Apopka-Vineland Road in Dr. Phillips. State maintenance as SR 482 begins between County Road 439 (Turkey Lake Road) and Interstate 4 (SR 400). SR 482 heads east past the International Drive area to a single-point urban interchange with State Road 435 (Kirkman Road) just north of the entrance to Lockheed Martin. East of that, SR 482 continues towards an interchange with County Road 423 (John Young Parkway), crossing over Florida's Turnpike, and intersects US 17/US 92/US 441 (Orange Blossom Trail) just west of The Florida Mall. It continues east passing by the SunRail Station that bears its name, then changes its name from Sand Lake Road to McCoy Road at State Road 527 (Orange Avenue). SR 482 ends at the interchange with State Road 528 (Beachline Expressway) and Boggy Creek Road west of Orlando International Airport; McCoy Road continues as the north-side frontage road to SR 528, cut in several places, to State Road 15 (Narcoossee Road).

=== Attractions ===
On this road features the World's Largest Entertainment McDonald's. The planned Skyplex complex was to be located at the corner of SR 482 and International Drive, but was cancelled after US Thrill Rides LLC and Polercoaster LLC went bankrupt.

== History ==
It was part of State Road 528 and then State Road 528A before being renumbered SR 482.

== Major intersections ==
The entire route is in Orange County.

Location	mi	km	Destinations	Notes
Doctor Phillips	0.000– 0.186	0.000– 0.299	I-4 / Sand Lake Road west – Orlando, Disney World, Tampa	Exit 74A on I-4 (SR 400); continues west without designation
Orlando	0.351	0.565	International Drive	
Orlando	1.100	1.770	SR 435 north (Kirkman Road)	Interchange; southern terminus of SR 435; Kirkman Road continues south without designation
Orlando	2.981	4.797	CR 423 (John Young Parkway)	Interchange
Orlando	3.25	5.23	Florida's Turnpike	Interchange under construction
Sky Lake	4.618	7.432	US 17 / US 92 / US 441 (Orange Blossom Trail) to Florida's Turnpike / I-4 east – Orlando, Kissimmee	Road is unsigned SR 500 / SR 600
Belle Isle	6.874	11.063	SR 527 north / CR 527A south (Orange Avenue) – Orlando, Taft	Termini of SR 527 and CR 527A
Belle Isle	7.813	12.574	SR 528 / Boggy Creek Road (CR 530) / Jetport Drive – Airport	Tolled highway; exit 8 on SR 528 (Beachline Expressway); northern terminus of CR 530
1.000 mi = 1.609 km; 1.000 km = 0.621 mi: Electronic toll collection
