= University, Florida =

University, Florida, may refer to either of two census-designated places in the state of Florida, United States:

- University, Hillsborough County, Florida
- University, Orange County, Florida

== See also ==
- University of Florida
- University Park, Florida
