= Minorville, Florida =

Coordinates: 28°33′08″N 81°32′15″W

Minorville is at the intersection of SR 50 (Colonial Drive) with former SR 439 (Bluford Avenue) and CR 526 (Old Winter Garden Road). It is inside the city of Ocoee, Florida
