= Florida State Road 537 =

Former state highway in Florida

State Road 537

Route information
- Maintained by FDOT
- Length: 1.027 mi (1.653 km)

Major junctions
- South end: SR 50 in Winter Garden
- North end: SR 438 in Winter Garden

Location
- Country: United States
- State: Florida
- Counties: Orange

Highway system
- Florida State Highway System; Interstate; US; State; Former; Pre‑1945; Toll; Scenic

State Road 537 was a short 1-mile (1.6 km) Florida State Road in Orange County, located entirely in Winter Garden and locally named Dillard Street. It was a commuter route of SR 535; the other commuter routes in Winter Garden are Colonial Drive and SR 438. The southern terminus was SR 50, and the northern terminus was SR 438. South of SR 50, it became Daniels Road. Beyond its northern terminus, it became a residential street that extends to the shore of Lake Apopka.

This road was decommissioned by the state in late 2009; all signage indicating the road number has been removed.

== Major intersections ==
The entire route was in Winter Garden, Orange County.

mi	km	Destinations	Notes
0.000	0.000	SR 50 (N. Colonial Drive)	
1.027	1.653	SR 438 (Plant Street) to SR 429	
1.000 mi = 1.609 km; 1.000 km = 0.621 mi
