= Apopka-Vineland Road =

Several roads in Orange County, Florida

Coordinates: 28.5644809°N 81.4920999°W

Apopka-Vineland Road
- County Road 435

Southern section
- Length: 11.2 mi (18.0 km)
- South end: SR 535 / CR 535 / CR 439 in Vineland
- North end: CR 526 near Gotha

Northern section
- Length: 16.9 mi (27.2 km)
- South end: SR 50 near Pine Hills
- Major intersections: US 441 in Apopka
- North end: CR 435 near Mount Plymouth

Location
- Country: United States
- State: Florida
- County: Orange

Highway system
- County roads in Florida; County roads in Orange County

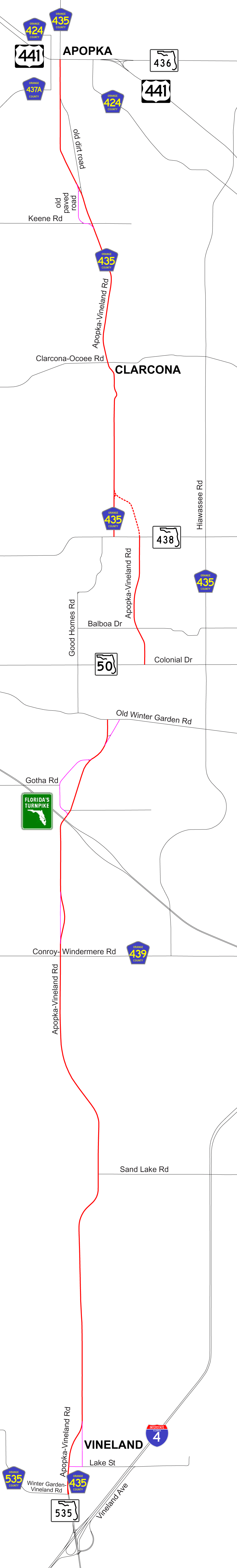
map

Apopka-Vineland Road is the name of several roads in Orange County, Florida, roughly forming a line from Apopka south to Vineland. As of now, there is one gap, from Old Winter Garden Road to State Road 50 (Colonial Drive), which contains a residential neighborhood and State Road 408, the tolled East-West Expressway.

The majority of the route is designated, but not always signed, as County Road 435 (CR 435). A small segment of CR 435, from SR 50 to SR 438, runs along the parallel Hiawassee Road just to the east.

== Route description ==
The whole southern section from Vineland to Old Winter Garden Road is four lanes wide (the last section, from Florida's Turnpike to Old Winter Garden Road, was completed in 2005). The north section from State Road 50 to A.D. Mims Road in Clarcona is newly constructed four lanes, but from there to Apopka the road remains two lanes. North of McCormick Road the name changes to Clarcona Road. This section connects to the Apopka Expressway State Road 414 via Keene Road.

In the city of Apopka, the name changes again to Park Avenue.

== History ==
Before 1926, there was no road named Apopka-Vineland Road. The only part of the south half to exist was the diagonal section from Old Winter Garden Road south to Gotha Road, part of the old dirt road from Orlando to Gotha. The north section (north of SR 438) was all there, but was known as Clarcona Road, as it passed through Clarcona.

On February 9, 1926, the Orange County Board of County Commissioners approved a $7 million bond issue to build a system of paved roads, supplementing the limited network already existing; the voters approved it 993 to 143 on March 23, 1926. Included in this system was road #24, "Apopka-Vineland to County Line". This road was planned to use what is now Apopka-Vineland Road and State Road 535 (Apopka-Vineland Road) from the existing brick road on Park Avenue in Apopka south to the Osceola County line. It would have used short sections of SR 438 and Old Winter Garden Road, connecting between the two using Good Homes Road (which was at the time a dirt road, and is now paved). Thus the original planned Apopka-Vineland Road all exists, but is not all called that.

Not all the roads in the bond issue were built; this included the center section of Apopka-Vineland Road. Over the years, plans were made to fill the gap; the most recent continued straight from Old Winter Garden Road across SR 50, north across SR 438 about ¼ mile east of the existing road, and curving back to join the road north of SR 438. This has been built between SR 50 and SR 438, and is being built north of SR 438, but housing subdivisions were built in the way south of SR 50.

Short realignments have also been built. Of note are the bypass around Vineland (the old road is Lake Street and Ruby Lake Road), the realignment at Keene Road south of Apopka (moving it back to the old location next to the Florida Central Railroad, now the West Orange Trail), the realignment just south of Old Winter Garden Road, and the realignment just north of Florida's Turnpike, crossing an arm of Lake Steer. As a result of these last two realignments, most of the old road towards Gotha is no longer used by through traffic.

The road named Old Clarcona Road, south of downtown Apopka, was never the paved through road; it served through traffic before the 1926 bond issue.

The part north of SR 438 was taken over by the state at some point, as SR 435, and is now a county road again, CR 435. SR 435 continued east on SR 438 and south on Hiawassee Road, jogging east on SR 50 to reach Kirkman Road, which is still SR 435. SR 435 also continued north into Lake County to end at SR 46 in Mount Plymouth; this is also CR 435.

A while ago, CR 435 signs were installed at the south end, where it meets CR 535 (former SR 535); this section was never SR 435 but may have been state-maintained (along with Good Homes Road). Orange County has stated that the road is not CR 435, but has not removed the signs, and in fact new county-installed green signs at the intersection still mention the number.

== Major intersections ==
The entire route is in Orange County.

Location	mi	km	Destinations	Notes
Vineland	0.0	0.0	SR 535 south (Apopka-Vineland Road / Palm Parkway / Winter Garden Vineland Road) / CR 535 north / CR 439 north to I-4 – Lake Buena Vista, Kissimmee, Winter Garden	Apopka Vineland Road continues south; termini of SR 535, CR 439, and CR 535
	11.2	18.0	Old Winter Garden Road (CR 526) to SR 408	
Gap in route
	0.0	0.0	SR 50 (Colonial Drive) to SR 408	
	1.8	2.9	SR 438 (Silver Star Road)	CR 435 designation resumes
South Apopka	6.4	10.3	Keene Road to SR 414 east	
Apopka	8.3	13.4	Michael Gladden Boulevard (CR 437A south) to SR 429 south	Northern terminus of CR 437A
Apopka	8.7	14.0	US 441 (Main Street)	
	16.6	26.7	SR 429 (Wekiva Parkway)	Former northern terminus of SR 429
	16.9	27.2	CR 435 north	Continuation into Lake County
1.000 mi = 1.609 km; 1.000 km = 0.621 mi: Closed/former; Route transition
