= Florida State Road 50 =

Highway in Florida, US

State Road 50
- SR 50 highlighted in red, SR 50A highlighted in blue

Route information
- Maintained by FDOT
- Length: 114.269 mi (183.898 km)
- Existed: 1945 renumbering (definition)–present

Major junctions
- West end: US 19 / CR 550 in Weeki Wachee
- US 41 in Brooksville; I-75 near Brooksville; US 301 in Ridge Manor; US 27 in Clermont; Florida's Turnpike in Oakland; US 17 / US 92 / US 441 in Orlando; I-4 in Orlando; SR 417 near Union Park; I-95 in Titusville
- East end: US 1 in Titusville

Location
- Country: United States
- State: Florida
- Counties: Hernando, Sumter, Lake, Orange, Brevard

Highway system
- Florida State Highway System; Interstate; US; State; Former; Pre‑1945; Toll; Scenic
← SR 49	→ SR 51

State Road 50 (SR 50) runs across the center of the U.S. state of Florida through Orlando, with its termini at SR 55 (US 19) at Weeki Wachee and SR 5 (U.S. Route 1) in Titusville.

SR 50 is signed east–west. Within various counties throughout the state, the highway is signed with various names such as Cortez Boulevard in Hernando County and Colonial Drive in Orange County. The former section includes the concurrency with US 98 between Brooksville and near Ridge Manor. US 98-SR 50 is the only interchange with Interstate 75 in Hernando County.

Several portions of SR 50 east of SR 436 follow the original Cheney Highway, which was named for John Moses Cheney and was the first road to the coast from Orlando. Full travel from Orlando to Titusville on the Old Cheney Highway, however, is not possible due to the demolition of a bridge over the Econlockhatchee River. At the eastern terminus of SR 50, NASA's Vehicle Assembly Building is visible.

State Road 408, also known as the East-West Expressway or Toll Road 408, from its western starting point near Ocoee to its eastern terminus near the University of Central Florida near Bithlo, runs almost directly parallel to SR 50, with most exits on the 408 being within a mile to 2 miles away from SR 50. The East-West Expressway was originally designed to, and still does, relieve traffic congestion on SR 50 during rush hour.

== Route description ==
=== Hernando and Sumter counties ===
State Road 50 begins at US 19 and County Road 550 in the former City of Weeki Wachee. The first intersection around the east side of the city limits is with Deltona Boulevard(CR 589), which can be found on the opposite side of the West Hernando County Public Library. From here the road is mostly lined with residential properties to the south and sparse commercial offices ranging from a Hernando County Firehouse, to an office for the Withlacoochee River Electric Cooperative, to random medical offices. East of Nightwalker Road and July Avenue, SR 50 enters land owned by the Southwest Florida Water Management District, and the right-of-way for a set of power lines. From there, the road becomes the official northern border between Spring Hill and unincorporated Brooksville as it approaches the Sand Hill Scout Reservation. Immediately after the entrance to the aforementioned Boy Scout Camp, the road intersects Oak Hill Hospital on the opposite side. Shortly after the hospital, SR 50 climbs a hill and intersects with the gateway to High Point.

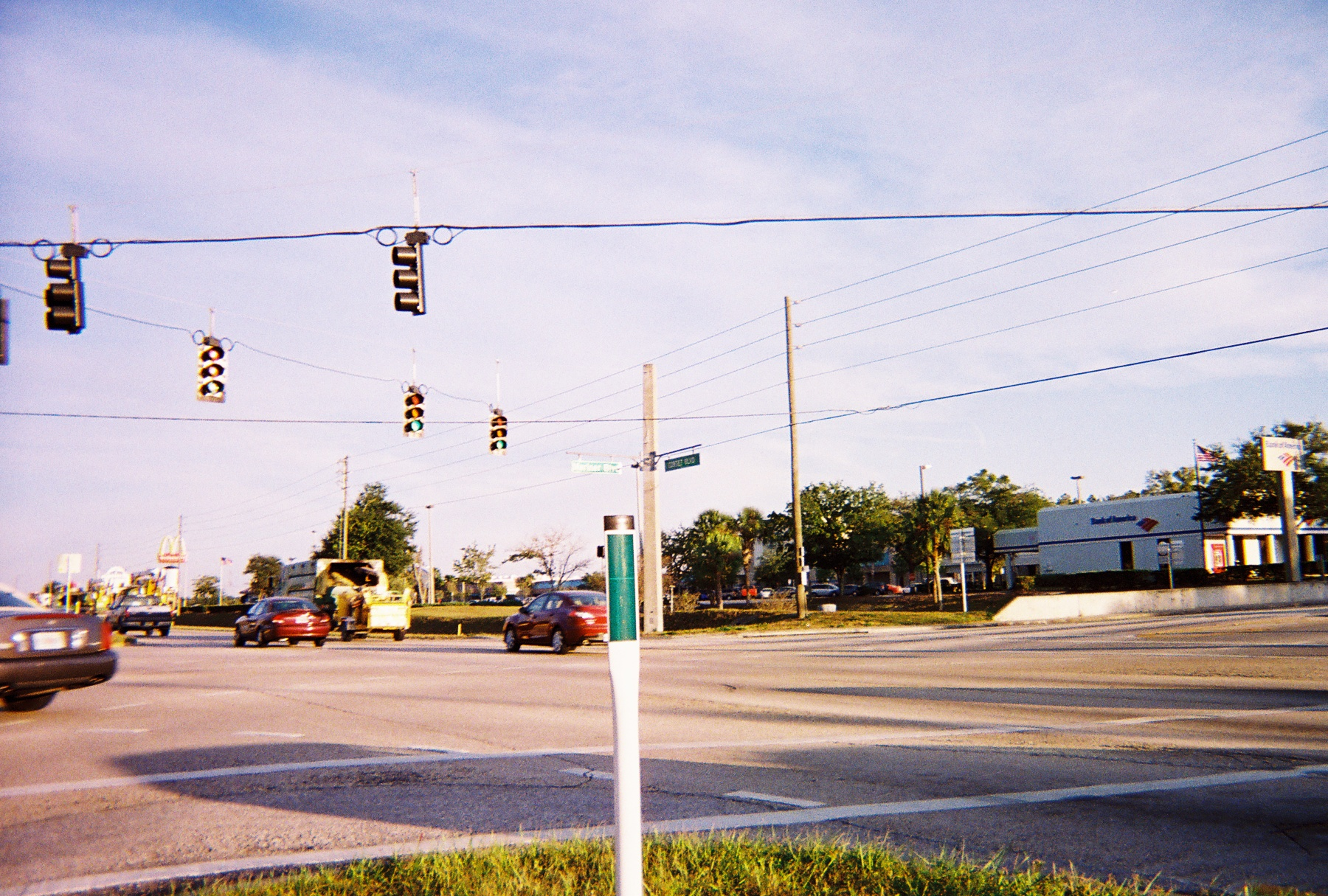
Suburban sprawl at the intersection of SR 50 and Mariner Boulevard.

From this point on, SR 50 is a symbol of the suburban sprawl that defines Hernando County. It also contains a series of disconnected frontage roads similar to those on US 19. Though most of the stores along these frontage roads consist of mini-malls, medical offices, and the occasional automotive repair shop, three major shopping centers can be found at the intersection with Mariner Boulevard, which is designated as CR 587 south of SR 50. East of those three major shopping centers is a Wal-Mart Supercenter and a Sam's Club Warehouse on the same side of the street. The Sam's Club is just west of the intersection of Sunshine Grove Road(CR 493) and Twin Dolphin Road, where SR 50 crosses the right-of-way for another set of power lines. While SR 50 climbs a hill and then descends, Twin Dolphin runs parallel to the eastbound lane as it climbs its own hill but then terminates at the same eastbound lane before SR 50 intersects CR 585(Barclay Avenue) and the entrance to Brookridge. From here the road runs along the southern edge of Brookridge until it intersects Oak Avenue, just before it passes under a pedestrian/bicycle bridge west of the interchange Suncoast Parkway, and instantly intersects CR 570(Wiscon Road), where the road curves to the northeast. Curving back to direct east, SR 50 intersects another former section at CR 484 and then serves as the northern terminus for CR 583(California Street). The right-of-way for the frontage road on the south side terminates in just east of Colorady Street, then the road descends towards Lykes Dublin Road and passes by Brooksville Regional Hospital, which moved out of the City of Brooksville in the first decade of the 21st century. The road then curves northeast towards the City of Brooksville. A right-of way for another frontage road was built on the north side of SR 50 in front of the hospital, and was assumed to be for nurses quarters for the hospital. This roadway was intended to stretch as far east as Mobley Road. Neither the road nor the nurses quarters have been built as of this writing.

At the southern end of CR 485 and the west end of State Road 50A, SR 50 takes a sharp right turn and joins US Truck Route 98 around downtown Brooksville, but never truly leaves the city limits. Curving to the southeast near the Hernando County Sheriff's Department headquarters, the remainder of the former rural characteristics of Brooksville can still be found, until it approaches US 41 where hidden State Road 700 secretly joins the road. Climbing another hill, the road turns direct east again where it passes in front of a pair of churches before the intersection of County Road 445(Main Street) and Mitchell Road, and then an at-grade crossing with CSX's Brooksville Subdivision. After the intersection with CR 581, the road turns northeast as it approaches the intersection of Jasmine Boulevard, but more importantly US 98 and the eastern terminus of SR 50A, as well as the eastern terminus of US Truck Route 98. From here the speed limit increases to 60 miles per hour. It moves primarily southeast through farmland and wooded swampland. US 98/SR 50 finally turns straight east again when it runs between a pair of lakebeds before the intersection with CRs 484 and 541. At this point, the road moves up and down a series of hills but first passes by communities such as Rolling Acres and Hill 'n Dale, where a residential frontage road can be found on the north side. The hills continue along the road, but along more farms and sparsely populated areas, among them Wildlife Lane. One trailer park can be found just west of Lockhart Road, which is the site of numerous dog shows. Entering the unincorporated community of Ridge Manor West, the road approaches some hotels, gas stations and restaurants serving motorist and tourists on Interstate 75. US 98-SR 50 is the only interchange along I-75 in Hernando County, and until the completion of the reconstruction of the interchange in September 2019, the left-turn lanes leading to the on-ramps were notoriously short. Directly east of I-75 is a development that shares the community's namesake as well as one shopping center.

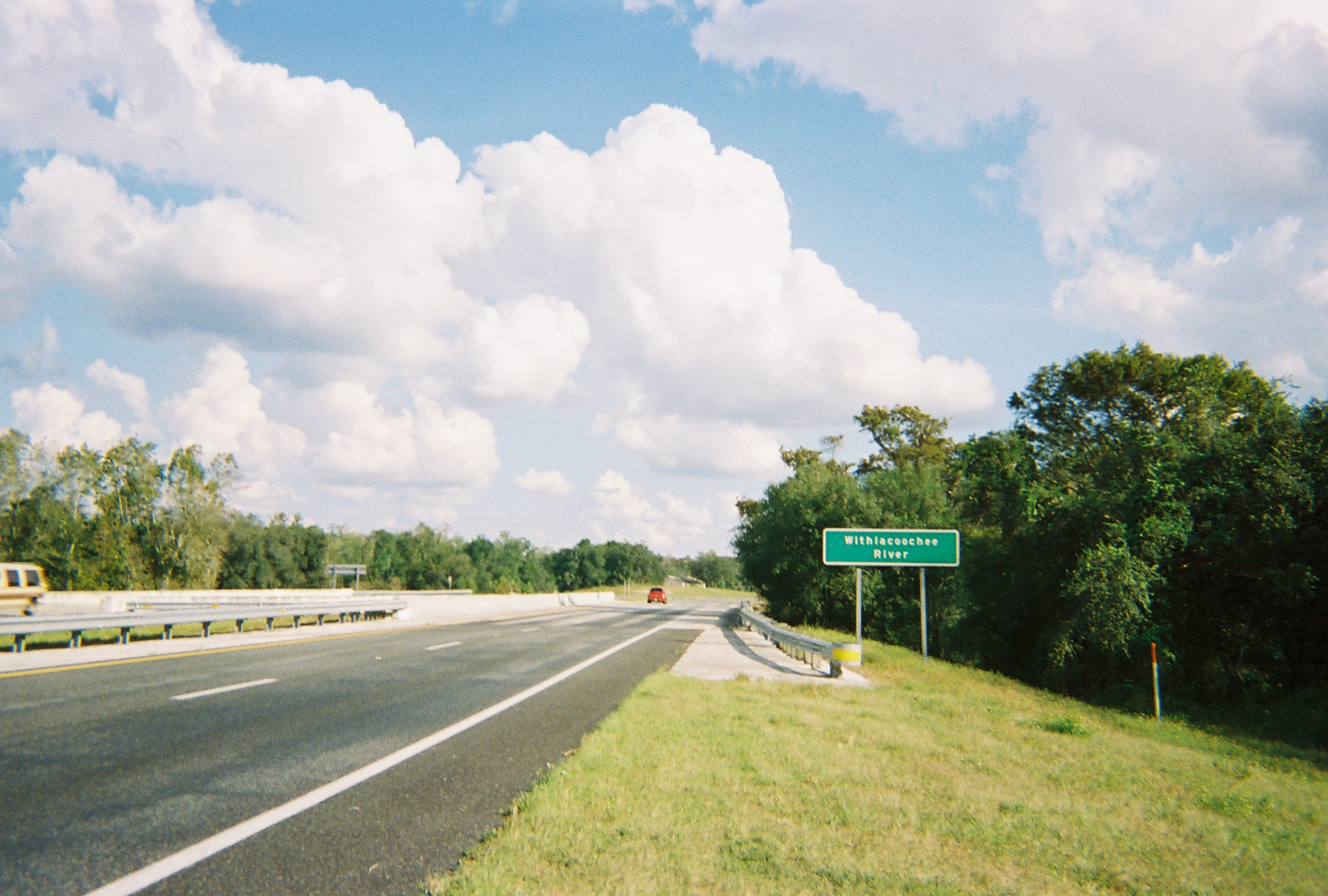
US 98-SR 50 both cross over the Withlacoochee River in Ridge Manor. The bridges were widened from four-to-six lanes since this photo was taken.

The road takes one last drop, only to rise again and officially enter Ridge Manor at the intersection of Kettering Road and Croom-Rital Road which leads to a trailhead for the Withlacoochee State Trail US 98-SR 50 pass under a bridge for this trail. At the crossing over the Withlacoochee River, two former sections of the road exist on the east side of the river; Paul N. Steckle Lane, and Ridge Manor Boulevard. The shorter Paul N. Steckle Lane exists on the north side and contains a Hernando County Firehouse, local residences, and one entrance to the Cypress Lake Preserve. Ridge Manor Boulevard begins on the south side, and crosses over to the north side east of the firehouse and west of the Hernando County Eastside Solid Waste Convenience Station. When US 98 turns southeast toward Trilby, Dade City, and West Palm Beach, SR 50 continues east and narrows down to two lanes. The final major intersection in Hernando County is with US 301. After this, the road passes by a sand mine, and the right-of way for an abandoned segment of Ridge Manor Boulevard, before it crosses the CSX's Wildwood Subdivision (part of the S-Line), and then serves as the northern terminus of CR 575 which becomes a State Road once it enters Pasco County. SR 50 turns northeast and enters Withlacoochee State Forest. Within the forest, the road crosses the Little Withlacoochee River, a tributary of the Withlacoochee River, where it crosses the Hernando-Sumter County Line.

As SR 50 enters Sumter County, it continues to move further north, however at the intersection of CR 478A, it turns back east before it enters Tarrytown and eventually intersects State Road 471 where one can find a clear view of a lumber mill. East of here, SR 50 runs along the north side of the former Orange Belt Railway right-of-way. Both SR 50 and the railroad bed pass through the rural unincorporated communities of Linden and then Mabel, which serves as the northern terminus for the General James A. Van Fleet State Trail. Access to the trail is available from both Sumter County Road 773 northwest of the trailhead as well as Southeast 121st Avenue northeast of the trailhead. The last intersection in Sumter County is CR 469, which takes motorists to Center Hill. SR 50 crosses the Sumter-Lake County Line in the vicinity of a series of power lines.

=== Lake County and western Orange County ===
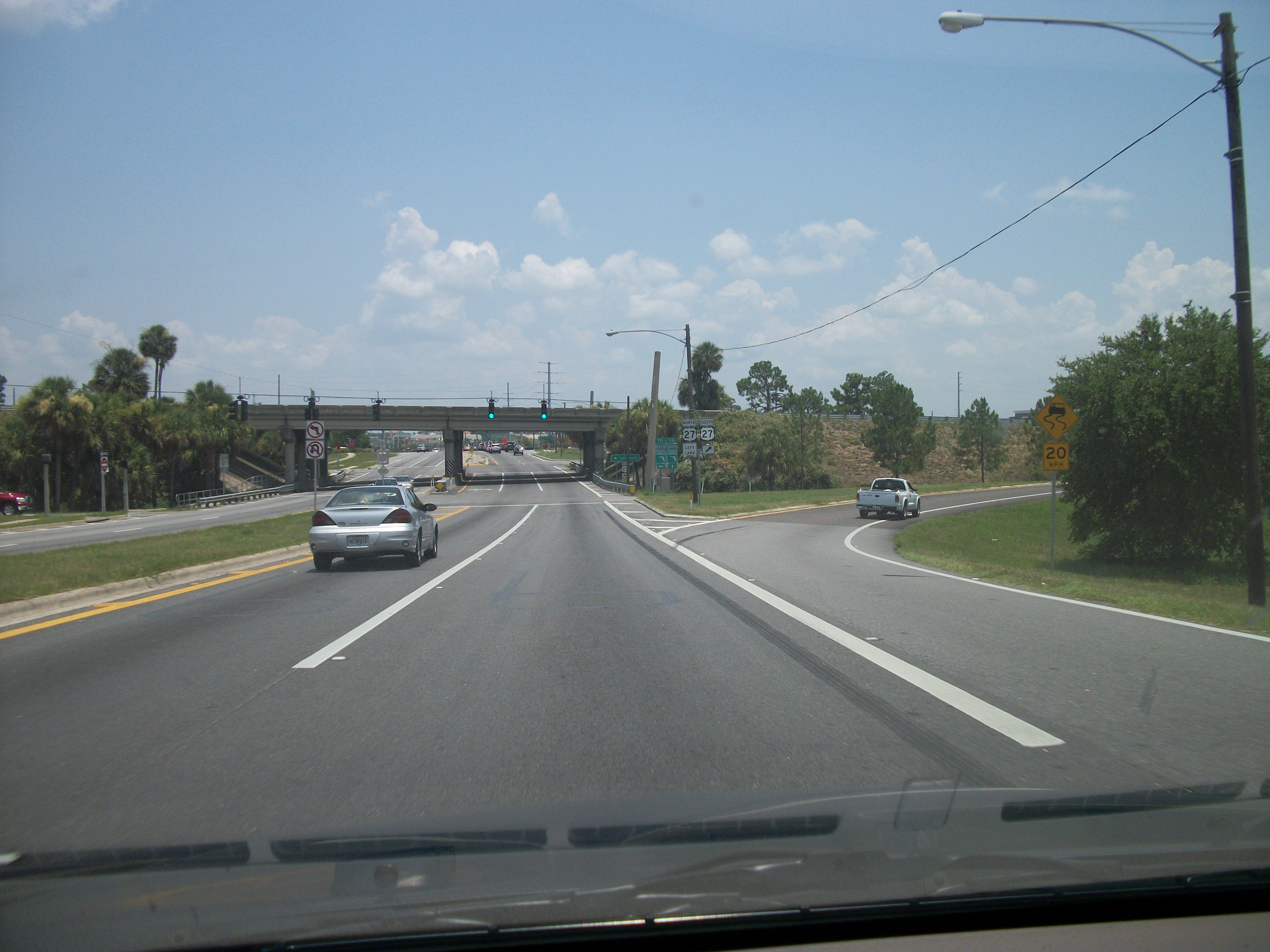
Eastbound SR 50 at the interchange with US 27 in Clermont, in July 2011. The interchange was rebuilt by FDOT between 2012 and 2014.

Upon entering Lake County, SR 50 maintains its rural surroundings as it runs through unincorporated communities such as Sloans Ridge, but even after running through Stuckey those characteristics diminish as the road moves further east. Within the City of Mascotte, the name of SR 50 changes to West Myers Boulevard. After the former Orange Belt Railway right-of-way crosses the road, a multiplex with State Road 33 begins at CR 33(Bluff Lake Road), where SR 50 suddenly becomes a four-lane divided highway named East Myers Boulevard. After the intersection with Atlantic Avenue, SR 33-50 also acquires the name Broad Street. These two names are shared until the road enters the city limits of Groveland, and Myers Boulevard terminates. The divider is widened further at a BP gas station in a former fork in the road when SR 50 becomes a pair of one-way streets in Downtown Groveland. Eastbound SR 33-50 becomes Orange Street, while westbound SR 33-50 remains Broad Street. After passing by Lake David the road intersects State Road 19. The two streets that carry two directions of SR 50 merge again at the east end of the multiplex with State Road 33. Broad Street continues to take SR 50 further east as a four-lane divided highway. Roughly two blocks east of CR 565A, the road crosses into the City of Clermont, where it passes two developments before dipping down slightly and to the southeast to run over the Palatlakaha River between Lakes Hiawatha and Palatlakaha, the latter of which has a trailer park on the eastbound lane. Motorists used to be able to see the bell towers of the Clermont Blessed Sacrament Catholic Church well before the intersection with CR 561(12th Street). The church is on the northwest corner, but today both the church and its bell towers are obstructed by trees. Three intersections later at West Avenue the road turns directly east again in front of Center Lake to the north side and two blocks north of Lake Winona on the south side. After passing by Crystal Lake to the north SR 50 runs along the north edge of Lake Sunnyside, where it then runs southeast before reaching an unnumbered interchange with US 27.

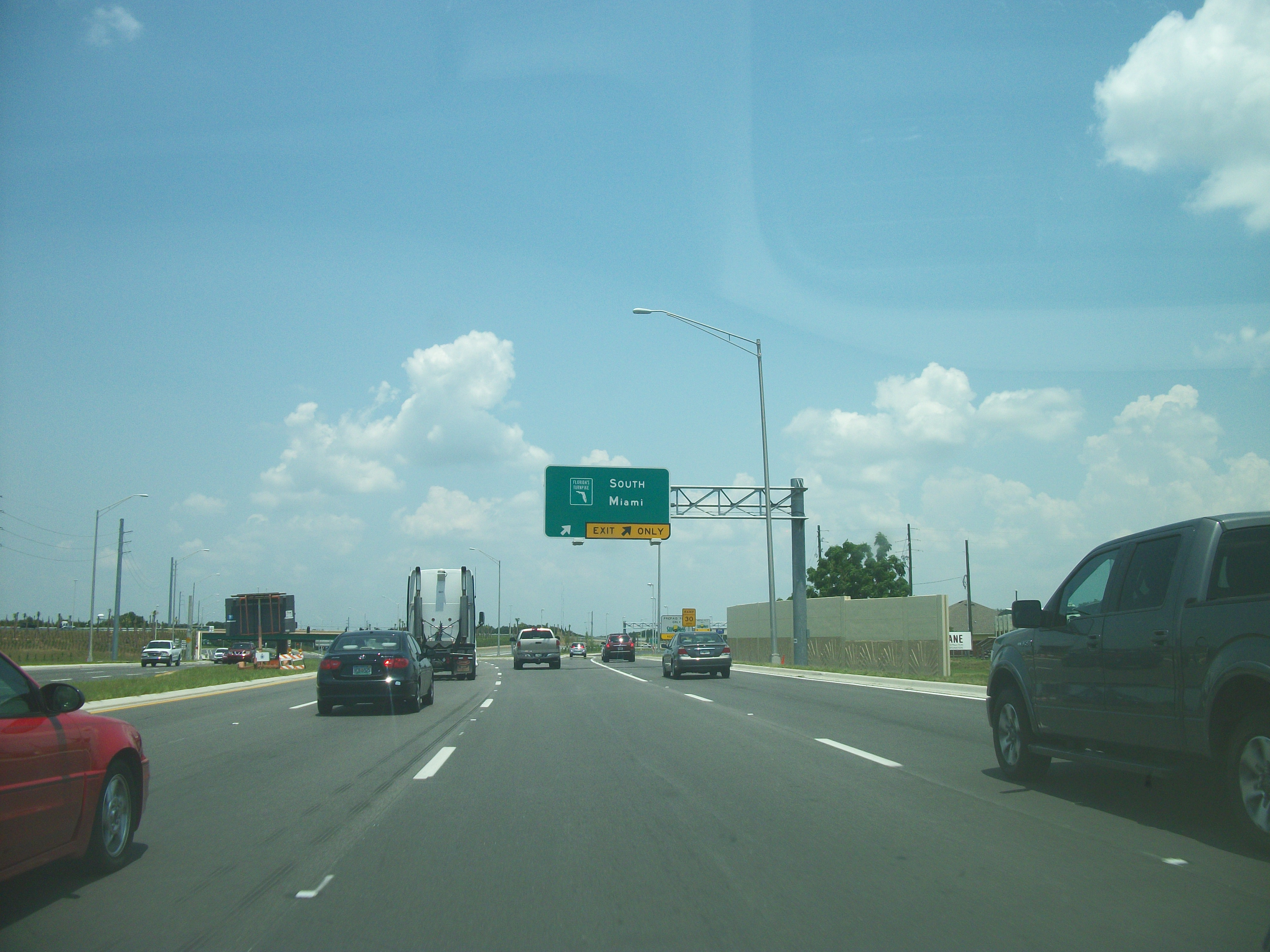
SR 50 just before it approaches Florida's Turnpike.

As the road crosses the Lake-Orange County Line, it instantly enters the census-designated place of Killarney. Here, SR 50 is officially named "West Colonial Drive." On both sides of the border are connecting roads to Old State Road 50, as well as trailheads for the Lake Minneola Scenic Trail and West Orange Trail. The road's time in Killarney is short-lived though as it enters Oakland where it curves briefly to the northeast to encounter Florida's Turnpike, and the recently rebuilt Exit 272. The road evolves into a total commercial strip in Winter Garden, and serves as the terminus of County Road 545 north of Tildenville. It also intersects such roads as County Road 535 as well as State Road 537. The one and only interchange in Winter Garden is with State Road 429's (Western Expressway's) Exit 23, but immediately after this interchange SR 50 enters Ocoee where it intersects with Exit 267B on Florida's Turnpike, at another connector ramp without a crossing. The next major intersection in Ocoee is State Road 439 (Bluford Avenue) in Minorville, which also doubles as the western terminus of State Road 526 and leads to Old Winter Garden Road. Right after the intersection of Blackwood Avenue and the grounds of the Health Central Hospital, the road intersects both Clarke Road and the connecting ramps to and from State Road 408, which is considered Exit 1. Past this, the road heads south of the West Oaks Mall. The final segment in Ocoee runs along more strip malls and cluster developments, then runs along a causeway over Lake Lotta before it enters Orlando proper. The first intersection in Orlando is Good Homes Road, but then SR 50 goes over another causeway over Lake Sherwood. After this, the road intersects the still incomplete County Road 435(Apopka-Vineland Road). Currently CR 435 is detoured at Hiawassee Road. Other major intersections in western Orlando include the northern terminus of State Road 435 (Kirkman Road). Briefly, SR 50 runs through Orlando Chinatown and then resumes the previous commercial strip. Important intersections include State Road 423 (John Young Parkway). East of that intersection as SR 50 meets North Tampa Avenue the road narrows down to four lanes.

=== Downtown Orlando and vicinity ===
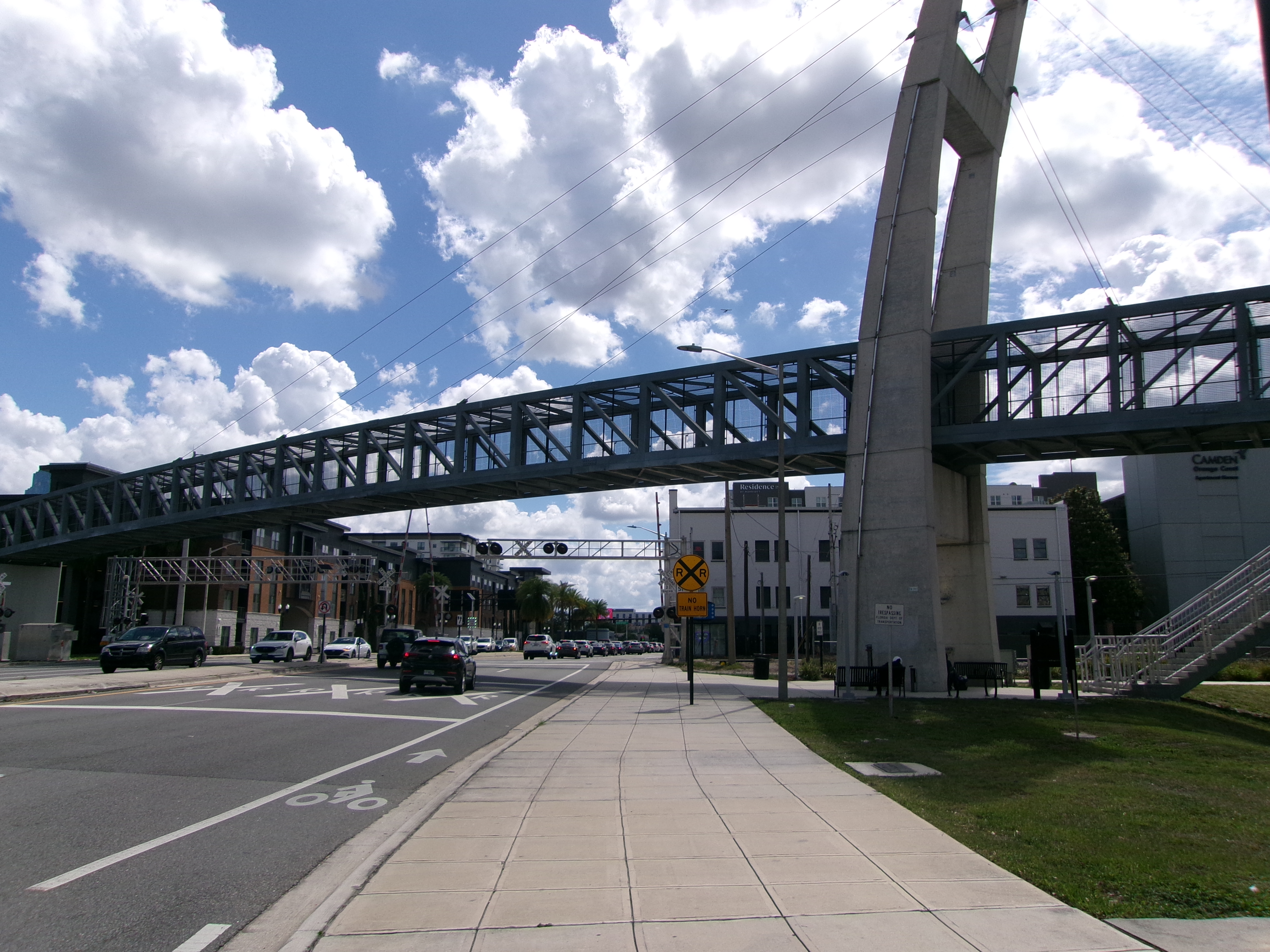
The Colonial Drive Pedestrian Bridge over US 17-92 and State Road 50 at the railroad crossing with SunRail in Downtown Orlando,

US 17-US 92-US 441 (Orange Blossom Trail) serves as the western end of the U.S. Route 17/92 (SR 500/SR 600) concurrency. Here, US 17-92 (and SR 600) end their concurrency with US 441, and join SR 50, while US 441 and the Orange Blossom Trail move further northwest in Florida and beyond. A railroad line runs along the right side of this intersection, and the first feature along the US 17/92-SR 50 multiplex is a grade crossing. US 17/92 with SR 50 (and SR 600), meets the south end of Edgewater Drive and passes by Lake Dot Park and then Don Dudley Park before it crosses Interstate 4 (SR 400; Exits 83B & 84) then crosses the SunRail tracks (former CSX A-Line) and State Road 527 (Orange Avenue southbound and Magnolia Avenue northbound) before meeting State Road 15 (Mills Avenue), where US 17/92 turns north thereby marking the eastern end of US 17/92 (SR 600) concurrency. Between Maguire Boulevard and Lake Barton, SR 50 runs along the northern border of Orlando Executive Airport, however the view of the airport is obstructed by numerous stores and shopping malls. Along this stretch, the road passes north of Colonial Plaza and south of Orlando Fashion Square. Across from Lake Barton is the western terminus of Old Cheney Highway, a former section of SR 50. East of this intersection is Little Lake Barton, and SR 50 begins to curve to the northeast, but not as sharply as the former segment. Lake Barton stretches from the vicinity of this intersection to the southwest corner of State Road 436 (Semoran Boulevard), which has had an interchange since 2010. The road continues its northeast curve into Azalea Park as it passes by the nearby Colonial High School named in honor of SR 50, it then intersects Old Cheney Highway a second time but then moves directly east again before the intersection with State Road 551 (Goldenrod Road).

=== East of Orlando and the Space Coast ===
Though leaving Orlando, SR 50 remains in Orange County as it enters Union Park, Here the road has one interchange with State Road 417 (Central Florida GreeneWay) at Exit 34, but signs also point towards State Toll Road 408. Entering University Park, SR 50 intersects such major highways as State Road 434 (Alafaya Trail), and then the eastern terminus of State Road 408 at Exit 23, which is also the southern terminus of the Challenger Parkway at the University of Central Florida. After crossing a bridge over the Econlockhatchee River, the road curves to the southeast and passes through Lockwood and then Bithlo which is near the Orange County Raceway complex, which includes the Orlando Speed World Dragstrip and the Orange Speed World Speedway. Further east within Bithlo, SR 50 serves as the western terminus of State Road 520 at an interchange with no exit numbers. East of this interchange the road turns direct east again and passes through Christmas, a rural community containing various Christmas shops, trailer parks and the Jungle Adventures Nature Animal Park which boasts of having "Swampy" the world's largest alligator.

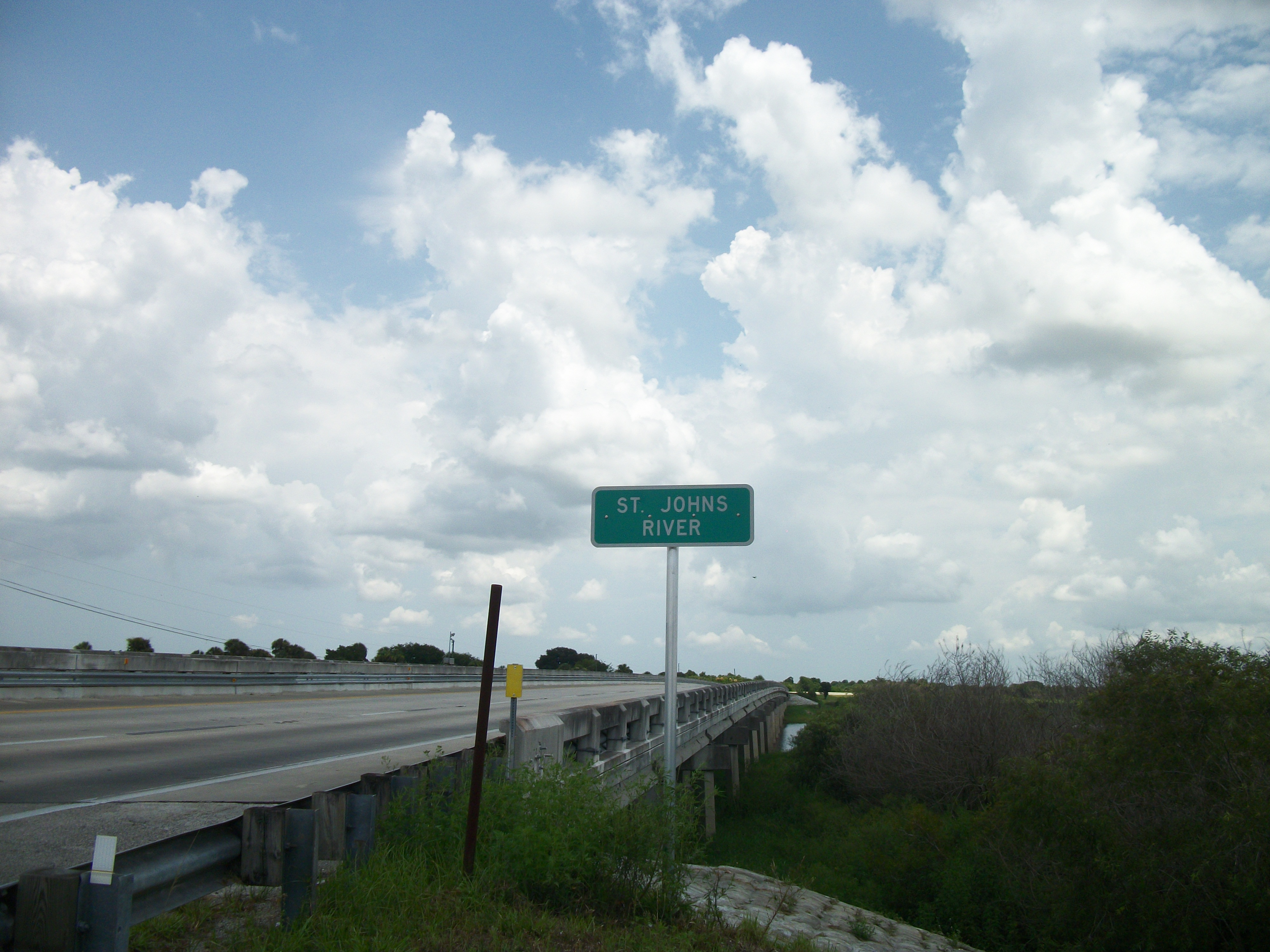
SR 50 crosses one of three bridges over the St. Johns River.

Before crossing the St. Johns River, SR 50 runs along the northern border of the Tosohatchee State Reserve. The westbound bridge over the river was built in 1967, while the eastbound bridge was built in 1971. After crossing the third bridge along the river, it enters Brevard County and the name changes from East Colonial Drive to Cheney Highway. From here it runs along the southern border of the Saint Johns National Wildlife Refuge, which terminates at the interchange with Interstate 95 at Exit 215. SR 50 officially enters Titusville after passing by the entrance to The Great Outdoors Golf and Recreational Vehicle Resort, west of the I-95 interchange. Immediately the road is lined with hotels gas stations and restaurants as it curves to the northeast to intersect State Road 405, which serves as a half-loop around Titusville to Kennedy Space Center. From here the road curves east again, and stays straight throughout most of the rest of the segment, with the exception of an area known as The Meadows between Hood Avenue and Moon Road. After the Florida East Coast Railroad crossing, NASA's Vehicle Assembly Building is visible just before the east end of SR 50 at US Route 1.

== History ==
Before the 1945 renumbering, the route that became SR 50 had the following numbers:

- SR 15 from Weeki Wachee to Brooksville
- SR 34 from Brooksville to Rolling Acres
- SR 51 from Brooksville to Tildenville
- SR 210 from east of Ridge Manor to east of Mabel
- SR 22 from east of Mabel to Tildenville
- SR 2 from Mascotte to Groveland
- SR 208 from Tildenville south 1/4 mile
- SR 434 from south of Tildenville to Minorville
- SR 22 from Minorville to Indian River City
- SR 51 from Minorville to Orlando
- SR 322 from near Gotha to Orlando

SR 50 was defined in the 1945 renumbering as:

- From Weekiwachee Springs on SR 55 Northeasterly via Wiscon and Spring Hill to a junction with SR 45 in Brooksville and East along SR 45 to intersection with Main St. then South on Main St. to a point near the South City Limits of Brooksville. Then East and Southeasterly via Rital to Richloam thence Northeasterly via Riverland - Tarrytown and Mable[sic] to a junction with SR 33 in Mascotte and along SR 33 to intersection with SR 459 at Groveland. Thence in an Easterly direction via Minneola - Oakland - Minorville and Orlovista[sic] to a junction with SR 500 in Orlando and North along SR 500 to Colonial Drive then East along Colonial Drive and Easterly via Bithlo - Ft. Christmas to junction with SR 5 at Indian River City in Brevard County.
- Also from intersection of SR 50 and Massachusetts St. in Mascotte North along Massachusetts St. to intersection with SR 33.

Since then, the following changes have been made:

- SR 50 was extended west from its west end to Bayport, on the Gulf of Mexico. Later it was given back to Hernando County (now CR 550).
- A new alignment for SR 50 was built east of Brooksville, removing the section on Main Street (which may have become SR 581) and a part east of Main Street.
- Later, SR 50 was realigned around Brooksville, and the old road through downtown became SR 50A.
- Near the Withlacoochee River a higher four-lane bridge was built on a short realigned section. The old road, which only exists on the east side of the river is now called Paul N. Steckle Lane, and can be found behind a Hernando County Firehouse.
- Three dirt roads inside Withlacoochee State Forest were once part of SR 50. They include Richloam-Clay Sink Road, Riverland Road, and Ham Road.
- The spur in Mascotte is no longer state-maintained.
- A whole new alignment was built from east of Groveland to south of Tildenville, via Clermont. The old road became, in order from west to east, SR 565A (now CR 565A), SR 561A (now CR 561), SR 561 (now partly abandoned and partly maintained by Clermont), an unknown number (now CR Old 50), and SR 438 (now CR 438). The short north–south connector at Tildenville became an extension of SR 545 (now CR 545).
- A whole new alignment was built from Minorville to west of downtown Orlando. The old road became an extension of SR 526 (now CR 526), and the concurrency with SR 500/SR 600 was removed.
- Several minor realignments were built in 1948 (at least the eastern two) at SR 436 and west of and at Bithlo. The old roads are now Old Cheney Highway.
- In Mabel, a railroad bridge that went over the right-of-way for a former railroad line once used by Seaboard Air Line Railroad spanning from Coleman to Auburndale in Polk County until the 1980s. This bridge was removed by the Florida Department of Transportation in the early-2010s.
- State Road 50 from U.S. 27 in Clermont through the turnpike to Pine Hills Road was widened from four lanes to six-lanes, a divided highway with improvements to the on and off ramps of the Florida Turnpike. The construction project for six-laning from SR 436 to Dean Road has been completed, and next phase from Dean Road to Avalon Park Boulevard was started in early 2014. Improvements include the new overpass at the State Road 436 Semoran Boulevard intersection which has access ramps to Semoran Boulevard either southbound to the Orlando International Airport or northbound. This overpass was completed in 2010.

== Plans ==
State Road 50 is being widened from a two-lane undivided highway to a four-lane divided highway from U.S. 301 in Ridge Manor to east of Sumter County Road 478A near Tarrytown.

== Major intersections ==
County	Location	mi	km	Destinations	Notes
Hernando	Weeki Wachee	0.000	0.000	US 19 (Commercial Way / SR 55) / CR 550 west (Cortez Boulevard) – Spring Hill, St. Petersburg, Homosassa Springs	
Hernando	Spring Hill	0.462	0.744	CR 589 south (Deltona Boulevard)	
Hernando	Spring Hill	3.877	6.239	CR 587 south (Mariner Boulevard)	
Hernando	Spring Hill	4.590	7.387	CR 493 north (Sunshine Grove Road)	
Hernando	Spring Hill	5.089	8.190	CR 585 south (Barclay Avenue)	
Hernando	Spring Hill	5.84	9.40	SR 589 (Suncoast Parkway) – Crystal River, Tampa	SR 589 exit 46
Hernando	Spring Hill	6.024	9.695	CR 570 east (Wiscon Road)	
Hernando	Wiscon	7.049	11.344	CR 484 (Fort Dade Avenue)	
Hernando	Wiscon	7.248	11.665	CR 583 south (California Street)	
Hernando	Brooksville	9.872	15.887	SR 50A east (Jefferson Street) / US 98 Truck north / CR 485 north (Cobb Road) – Brooksville	west end of US 98 Truck overlap
Hernando	Brooksville	11.406	18.356	US 41 (Broad Street / SR 45) to US 98 north – Brooksville, Masaryktown	
Hernando		12.404	19.962	CR 445 north (Main Street) / Mitchell Road	
Hernando		13.167	21.190	CR 581 (Emerson Road)	
Hernando		13.732	22.100	US 98 north / SR 50A west (Jefferson Street / SR 700 north) / Jasmine Drive – Brooksville	east end of US 98 Truck overlap; west end of US 98 / SR 700 overlap
Hernando	Hill 'n Dale	17.927	28.851	CR 484 west (Mondon Hill Road) / CR 541 south (Spring Lake Highway) – Spring Lake, Dade City	
Hernando		21.95	35.33	I-75 (SR 93) – Tampa, St. Petersburg, Ocala	I-75 exit 301; Single-point urban interchange
Hernando	Ridge Manor	24.953	40.158	US 98 south (McKethan Road / SR 700) – Dade City	east end of US 98 / SR 700 overlap
Hernando	Ridge Manor	26.470	42.599	US 301 (Treiman Boulevard / SR 35) – Ocala, Dade City	
Hernando	Ridge Manor	27.446	44.170	CR 575 south (Burwell Road) – Lacoochee, Trilby	
Sumter		33.876	54.518	CR 478A north	
Sumter	Tarrytown	35.648	57.370	SR 471 – Webster, Lakeland	
Sumter		41.736	67.168	CR 469 north – Center Hill	
Lake	Mascotte	45.719	73.578	CR 565 south (South Bay Lake Road)	
Lake	Mascotte	46.362	74.612	CR 33 north – Leesburg	west end of SR 33 (eastbound) / CR 33 (westbound) overlap
Lake	Groveland	47.737	76.825	CR 565 north (Villa City Road)	
Lake	Groveland	48.501	78.055	SR 19 north (Lake Avenue) to Florida's Turnpike north – Howey-in-the-Hills	
Lake	Groveland	48.832	78.587	SR 33 south – Polk City	east end of SR 33 (eastbound) / CR 33 (westbound) overlap
Lake	Groveland	49.832	80.197	CR 565A south (Montevista Road) – Green Isle Ranch	
Lake	Groveland	50.586	81.410	CR 565A east	
Lake	Clermont	53.515	86.124	CR 561 (12th Street) – Minneola, Polk City	
Lake	Clermont	55.62	89.51	US 27 (SR 25) to Florida's Turnpike north – Leesburg, Haines City	interchange
Lake	Clermont	59.263	95.375	CR 455 north – Montverde	
Orange	Oakland	61.124	98.370	Oakland Avenue (CR 438)	
Orange	Oakland	61.96	99.71	Florida's Turnpike (SR 91) – Miami	FLTP exit 272
Orange	Oakland	62.611	100.763	Tubb Street (CR 438)	
Orange	Winter Garden	63.827	102.720	CR 545 south (Avalon Road)	
Orange	Winter Garden	65.073	104.725	CR 535 south (Vineland Road)	
Orange	Winter Garden	65.316	105.116	Daniels Road / Dillard Street - Winter Garden Historic District	former SR 537 north
Orange	Ocoee	66.82	107.54	SR 429 – Tampa, Apopka	SR 429 exit 23
Orange	Ocoee	67.25	108.23	Florida's Turnpike (SR 91) to SR 408 east / I-75 north – Ocala, Miami	FLTP exit 267B
Orange	Ocoee	67.826	109.155	CR 439 south (Maguire Road) – Windermere	
Orange	Ocoee	68.084	109.571	Bluford Avenue (CR 526 east) - Downtown Ocoee	former SR 439 north
Orange	Ocoee	69.146	111.280	SR 408 east / Clarke Road – Orlando, Titusville	SR 408 exit 1
Orange	Pine Hills	71.848	115.628	To SR 408 / Hiawassee Road (CR 435 north)	
Orange	Pine Hills	73.024	117.521	SR 435 south (Kirkman Road) to SR 408 / I-4 – Valencia Community College, Orlando Area Attractions	
Orange	Pine Hills	73.572	118.403	Pine Hills Road (CR 431)	
Orange	Orlando	75.616	121.692	SR 423 (John Young Parkway) to SR 408	
Orange	Orlando	76.724	123.475	US 17 south / US 92 west / US 441 (Orange Blossom Trail / SR 500 / SR 600 west) – Apopka, Kissimmee	west end of US 17 / US 92 / SR 600 overlap
Orange	Orlando	77.52	124.76	I-4 (SR 400) to SR 408	I-4 exit 84
Orange	Orlando	77.720	125.078	SR 527 south (Orange Avenue)	
Orange	Orlando	77.859	125.302	SR 527 north (North Magnolia Avenue) to I-4	
Orange	Orlando	78.622	126.530	US 17 north / US 92 east / SR 15 south (Mills Avenue / SR 15 north / SR 600 east) to SR 408	east end of US 17 / US 92 / SR 600 overlap
Orange	Azalea Park	81.94	131.87	SR 436 (Semoran Boulevard) – Orlando International Airport	Single-point urban interchange
Orange	Azalea Park	83.668	134.651	SR 551 (Goldenrod Road) to SR 408 – St. Cloud	
Orange		84.88	136.60	SR 417 to SR 408 – Orlando International Airport, Sanford	SR 417 exit 34
Orange	Union Park	86.169	138.676	Dean Road (CR 425)	
Orange	Alafaya–University line	88.460	142.363	SR 434 west (Alafaya Trail) – University of Central Florida, Oviedo	
Orange	Alafaya–University line	89.47	143.99	SR 408 west – Orlando, Ocoee	SR 408 exit 22
Orange	Alafaya–University line	90.006	144.851	CR 420 east (Lake Pickett Road)	
Orange	Bithlo	93.262	150.091	CR 419 north (Chuluota Road)	
Orange	Bithlo	94.770	152.518	County Road 13	
Orange	Bithlo	96.77	155.74	SR 520 east – Cocoa, Cape Canaveral	interchange
Orange	Christmas	100.533	161.792	CR 420 west (Fort Christmas Road) – Fort Christmas Museum Park	
Brevard	Titusville	110.86	178.41	I-95 (SR 9) – Jacksonville, Miami	I-95 exit 215
Brevard	Titusville	111.218	178.988	SR 405 (Columbia Boulevard / South Street) – Downtown Titusville, Kennedy Space Center	
Brevard	Titusville	114.269	183.898	US 1 (Washington Avenue / SR 5) – Titusville Historic District	
1.000 mi = 1.609 km; 1.000 km = 0.621 mi: Concurrency terminus

== Related routes ==
=== State Road 50A ===
State Road 50A
- Location: Brooksville

State Road 50A (SR 50A) is a former segment of SR 50 that runs primarily along West and East Jefferson Street, entirely in the city of Brooksville in the State of Florida. Like its parent route, it is signed east–west.

The road begins at the intersection of SR 50 (Cortez Boulevard, including the realigned section) and CR 485 (Cobb Road). The realigned section of SR 50 serves as Truck Route 50 as well as part of Truck US 98, while CR 485 also serves as Truck US 98. At Ponce de Leon Boulevard (US 98/SR 700), it becomes concurrent with US 98, until its eastern terminus with SR 50 and Jasmine Drive. Shortly after this new concurrence, it makes a right along North Mildred Avenue, for eastbound traffic only, and both merge with US 41. Between North Mildred Avenue and May Avenue, eastbound SR 50A, US 41, and US 98 are concurrent along Broad Street, while westbound SR 50A, US 41, and US 98 are concurrent along East Jefferson Avenue, then West Jefferson Avenue. US 41 reunites with Broad Street at North Mildred Avenue. This one-way configuration for Broad Street and Jefferson Street has been in effect since November 1993, according to the Florida Department of Transportation. While both segments go up and down steep hills in the heart of the city, the Broad Street (eastbound) section runs over an old railroad bridge built in 1936.

Turning south along East Jefferson Street near Roger's Christmas House, SR 50A & US 98 go down an easier hill where it curves to the left before the intersection with Martin Luther King Jr. Boulevard (formerly Summit Street/CR 581A), then zips past the northern terminus of CR 581 (Emerson Road), finally reuniting with SR 50, which US 98 becomes concurrent with until breaking away in Ridge Manor more than 12 miles (19 km) east.

=== County Road 550 ===
County Road 550
- Cortez Boulevard
- Location: Bayport – Weeki Wachee

County Road 550 is a former segment and coastal spur of SR 50. It runs from the Gulf of Mexico in Bayport to US 19 in Weeki Wachee, where it becomes SR 50. Like its parent route, it is signed east–west, and is named Cortez Boulevard.

County Road 550 begins at Bayport Park heading east, then later curves to the northeast until it approaches a seafood restaurant on the southwest corner of an intersection with CR 495, only to turn back east again over the tidal swamps of the coast, which are owned by the Chassahowitzka National Wildlife Refuge. Curving southeast, the road passes by a fishing encampment and another restaurant before intersecting with CR 597 north of Weeki Wachee Gardens. From there, a sparse residential area can be found, but after more woods, a semi-commercial area turns up. The road finally curves to the east before approaching preserved land near Weeki Wachee Springs and terminates at the intersection of US 19 and SR 50.

=== County Road Old 50 ===
County Road Old 50
- Location: Minneola – Killarney

County Road Old 50 is another former segment of SR 50. Like its parent route, it is signed east–west. Though other county roads were also part of State Road 50, the only portion signed as CR Old 50 is between Minneola and the Lake-Orange County Line. The segment east of CR 455 is part of the Green Mountain Scenic Byway.
