= Mabel, Florida =

- Unincorporated community
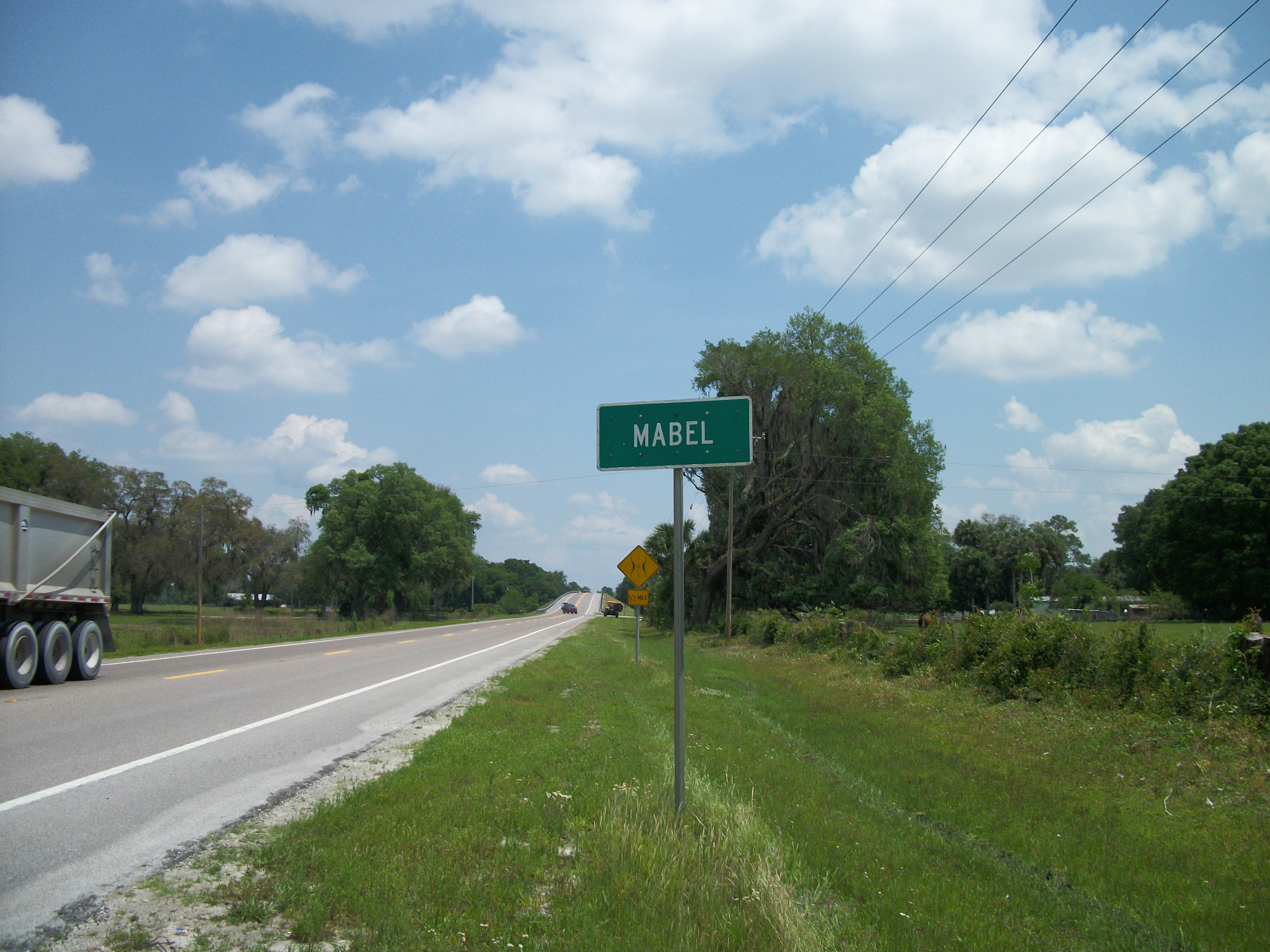
- Eastbound SR 50 as it approaches Mabel, Florida in April 2010.

- Location within Florida
- Coordinates: 28°34′46″N 81°58′37″W
- Country: United States
- State: Florida
- County: Sumter
- Elevation: 98 ft (30 m)
- Time zone: UTC-5 (Eastern (EST))
  - Summer (DST): UTC-4 (EDT)
- ZIP code: 33597, 33514
- Area code: 352
- GNIS feature ID: 295425

Mabel is an unincorporated community in central Sumter County, Florida, United States. The postal codes are 33597, which is shared by Webster to the northwest and 33514, which is shared by Center Hill to the north.

== Geography ==
Mabel is bordered by the Withlacoochee State Forest to the south, Linden to the west, Center Hill to the north, and Lake County to the east.

== Transportation and economy ==
The main road through Mabel is State Road 50. Two abandoned railroad lines also run through Mabel. One was the Orange Belt Railway line that spans from Trilby in Pasco County to Sylvan Lake in Seminole County. The other was a Seaboard Air Line Railroad line that spans from Coleman to Auburndale in Polk County.

Aside from local farms, the main attraction of Mabel is the northern terminus of the General James A. Van Fleet State Trail, which runs along the former railroad line between Coleman and Auburndale. SR 50 ran over a bridge above the former SAL line, and was kept for a future extension of the trail toward Coleman, aimed primarily at horse riders. The extension was never built, and the bridge was demolished in the early-2010s by the Florida Department of Transportation.

== History ==
Mabel began in the late 1800s, receiving a Post Office in 1894. The town was named after the daughter of Postmaster J.P. Phelps. This was a small community of 40-50 people, with a sawmill that made bean hampers (wooden fruit baskets) and other wood products. There was also a packing house called "Maybell". The sawmill and packing house closed as the residents slowly migrated to nearby Linden. The Post Office closed in 1918 and Mabel has remained a quiet spot on the map ever since.
