= General James A. Van Fleet State Trail =

State park in Florida, United States

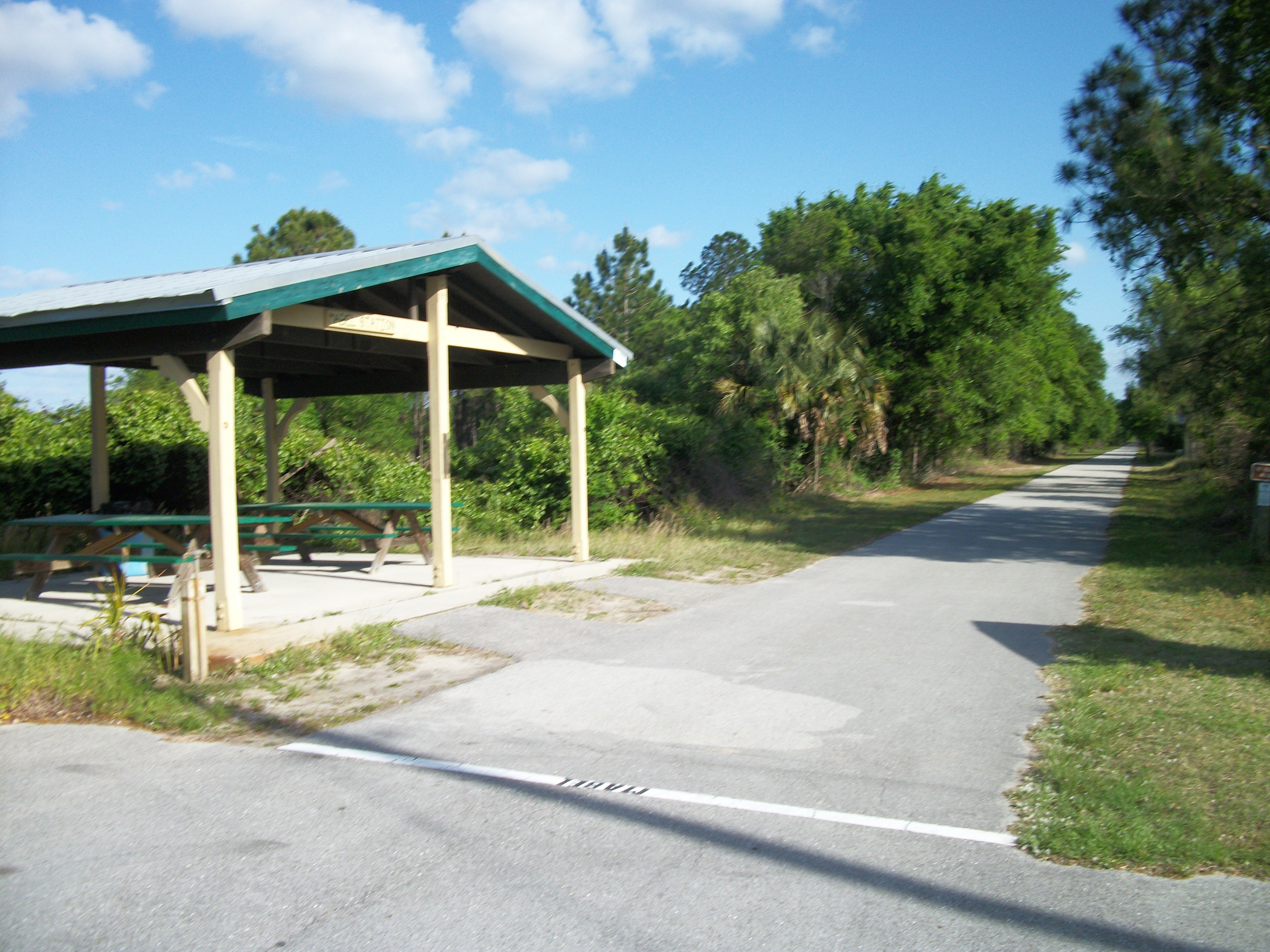
- Mabel Trailhead's picnic shelter, a.k.a. Mabel Station.
- Length: 29.2 mi (47.0 km)
- Location: Polk, Lake and Sumter counties, USA
- Designation: IUCN category V (protected landscape/seascape)
- Trailheads: Mabel; Bay Lake; Green Pond; Polk City

General James A. Van Fleet State Trail is a rail trail in Florida, named after General James A. Van Fleet, who was a distinguished combat commander in both World Wars and the Korean War.

It is protected as a Florida State Park and occupies a 29.2-mile (47.0 km) abandoned portion of the Seaboard Air Line Railroad's Miami Subdivision through Central Florida's Green Swamp area. It extends from Polk City in the south to Mabel in the north.

It passes through Bay Lake and crosses Lake, Polk and Sumter counties.

The entire 29.2-mile (47.0 km) length of the trail is paved approximately 12-foot (3.7 m) wide and is mostly straight, containing only one slight curve toward the southern end of the trail just north of the Polk City trailhead.

== Fauna ==
Among the wildlife species that can be seen along the trail are egret, heron and various raptor. Also sighted are white-tailed deer, Florida gopher tortoise, American alligator, common raccoon and Mexican long-nosed armadillo.

== Recreational activities ==
Activities include walking, running, inline skating, hiking, horseback riding, biking, and viewing wildlife.

== Hours and fees ==
Florida state parks are open between 8 a.m. and sundown every day of the year (including holidays). There is no admission necessary to use the park.

== Accessibility ==
The trail has four trailheads with parking areas specifically for the trail, each spaced approximately 9.6 miles (15.4 km) apart. These are located in Polk City at the intersection of State Road 33 and County Road 665; Green Pond at the intersection of Green Pond Road and the trail itself; Bay Lake at the intersection of Bay Lake Road (County Road 565) and the trail itself; and finally in Mabel where the trail intersects just south of State Road 50. The right of way for the former railroad line continues north on its way to Coleman. This line carried the Silver Meteor between Coleman and Auburndale until 1988, and had a bridge under SR 50. The bridge was kept intact for a future horses-only extension of the trail toward Coleman. The extension was never built, and the bridge was dismantled the early-2010s.

== Amenities ==
Amenities include a picnic pavilion, several picnic tables, restrooms, and drinking fountains.

Parking, restrooms, and drinking fountains are available at all four trailheads.

== Gallery ==
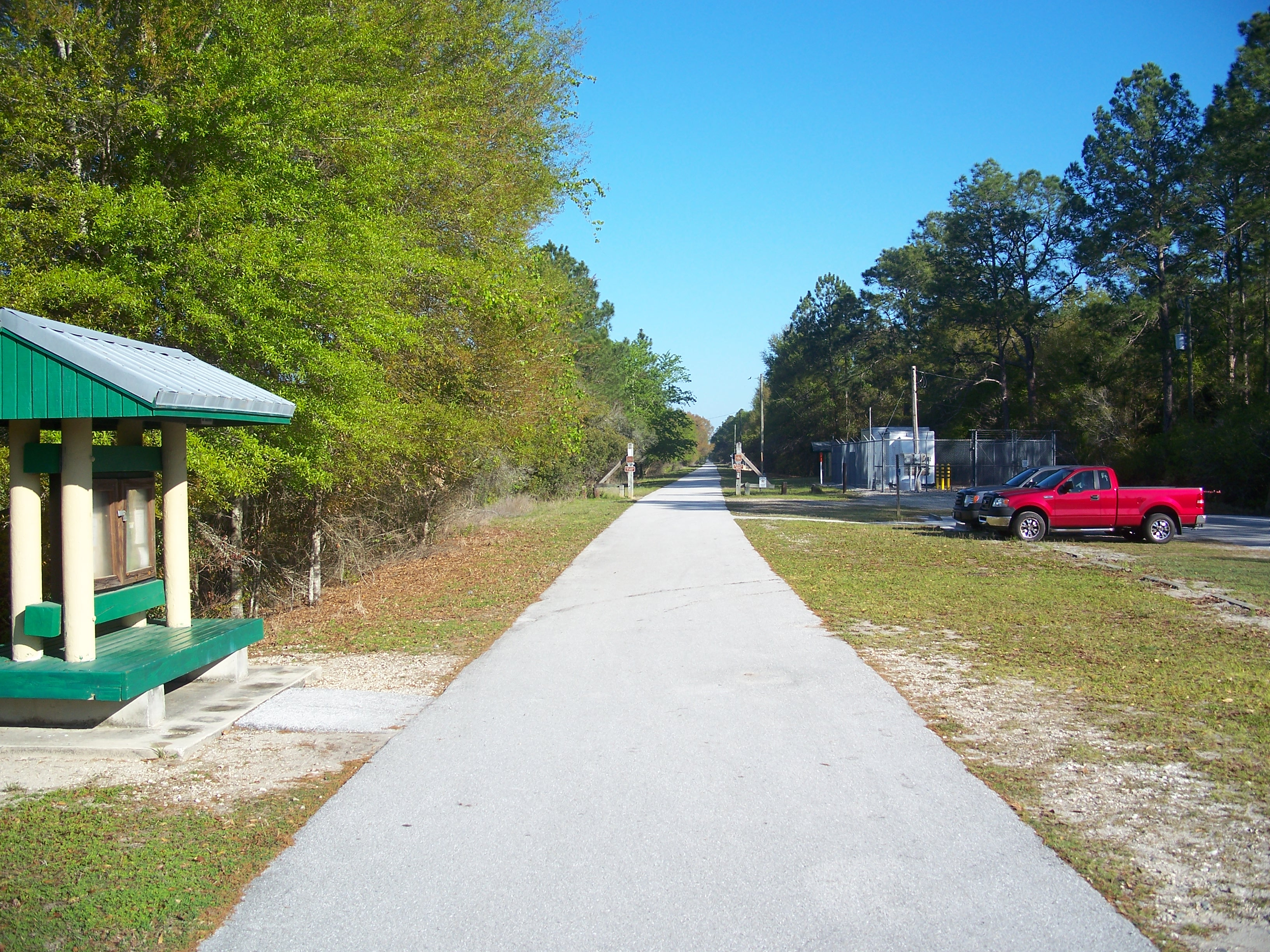
Green Pond Trailhead

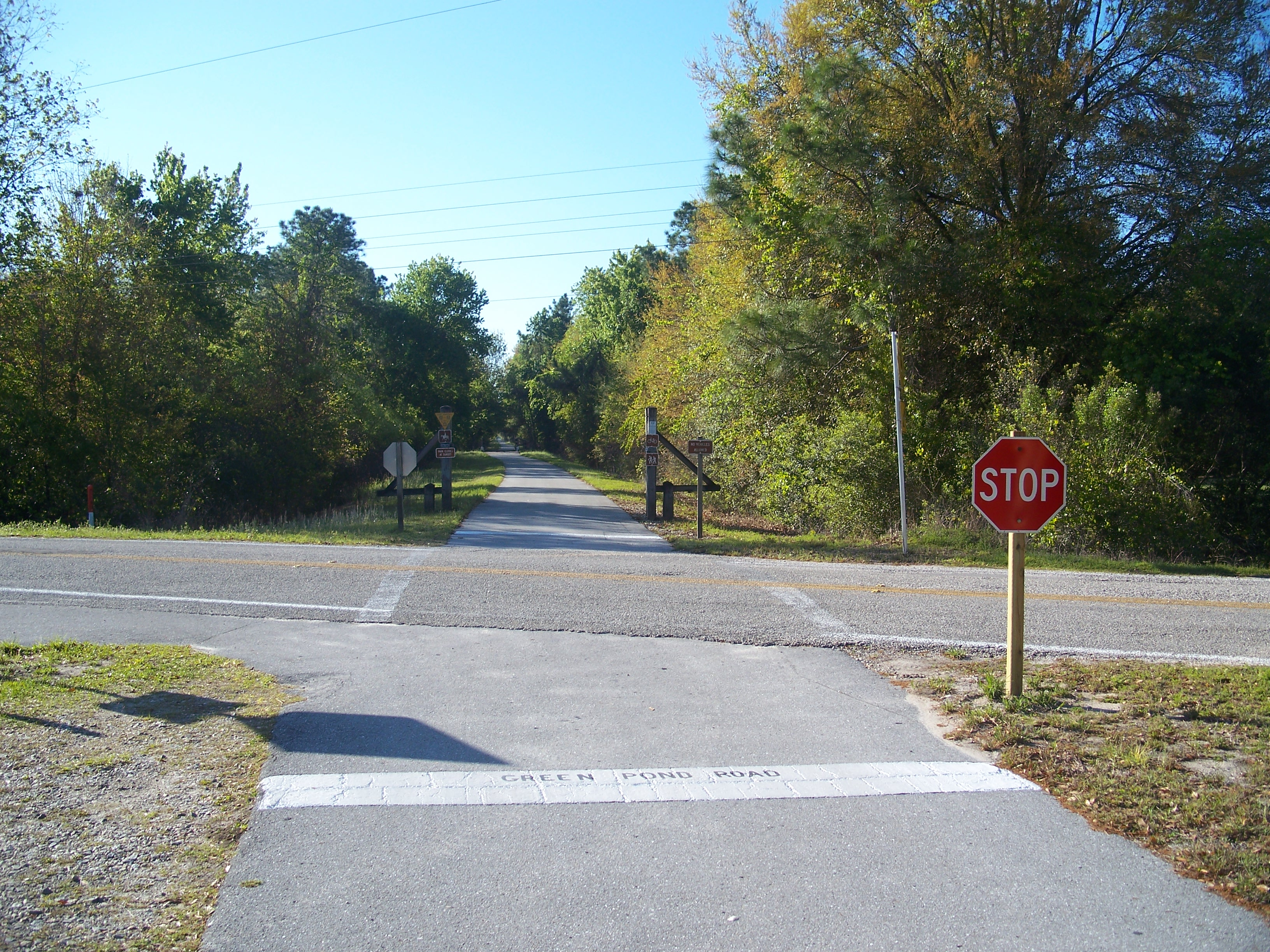
Green Pond Trailhead

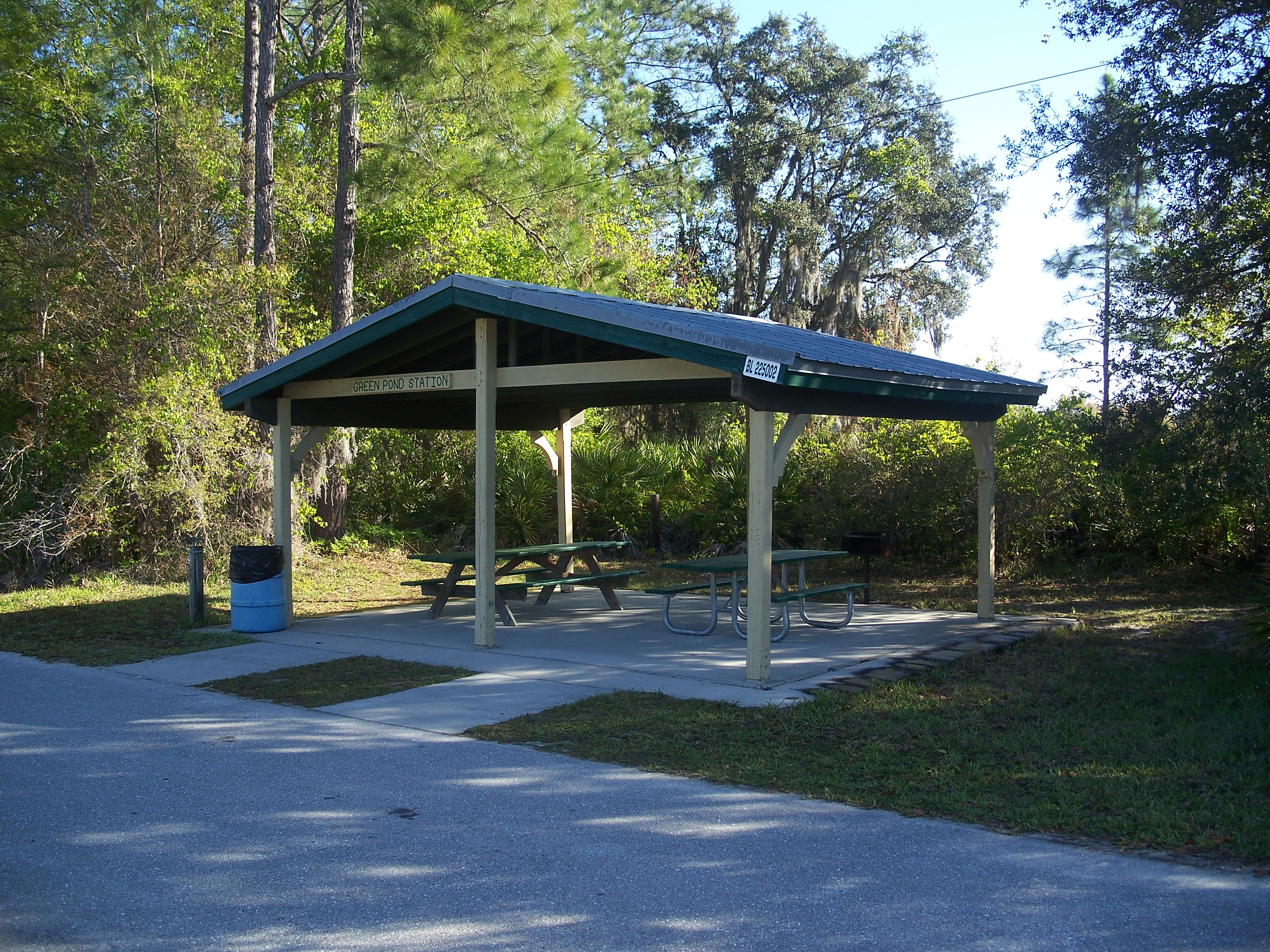
Green Pond Trailhead

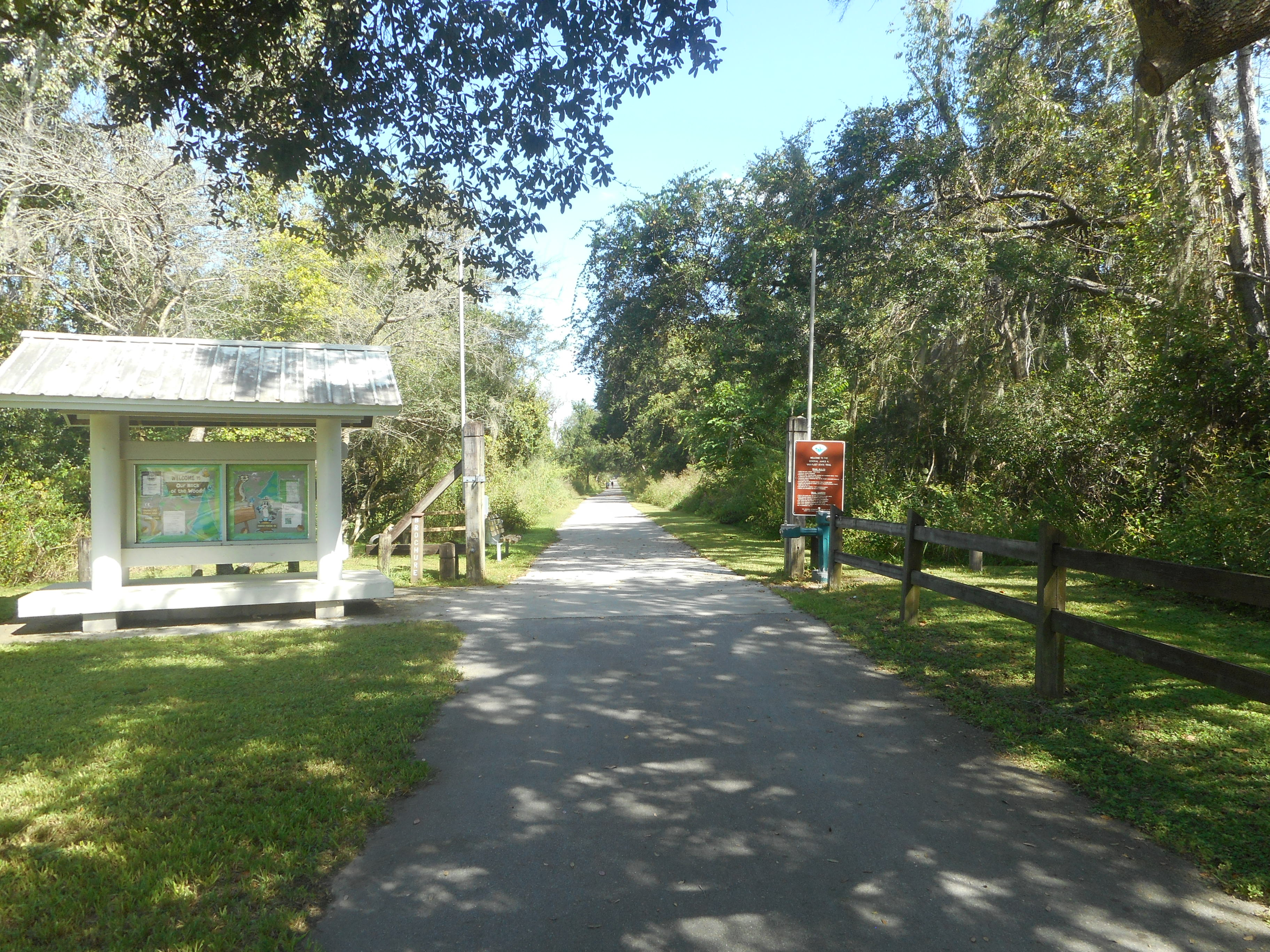
Polk City Trailhead

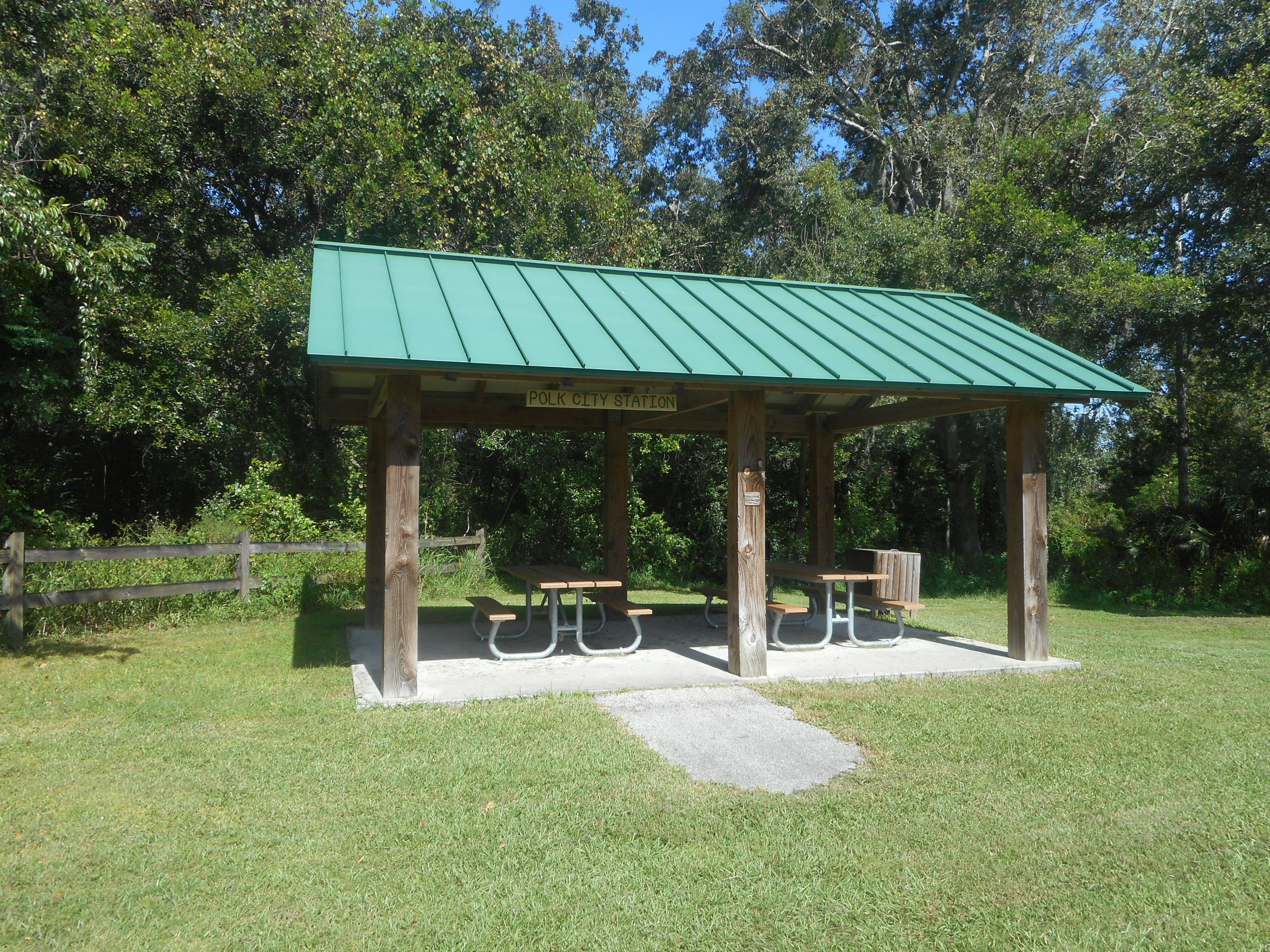
Polk City Trailhead
