= Florida State Road 435 =

Highway in Florida

State Road 435
- Kirkman Road

Route information
- Maintained by FDOT
- Length: 7.101 mi (11.428 km)

Major junctions
- South end: SR 482 in Orlando; Universal Epic Universe in Orlando
- I-4 in Orlando; SR 408 in Orlo Vista
- North end: SR 50 in Pine Hills

Location
- Country: United States
- State: Florida
- Counties: Orange

Highway system
- Florida State Highway System; Interstate; US; State; Former; Pre‑1945; Toll; Scenic
← SR 434	→ SR 436

State Road 435 (SR 435), signed as Kirkman Road along its entire route, is a state highway in Florida, existing entirely within Orange County. Kirkman Road is a major arterial on the west side of Orlando, and bounds the east side of Universal Orlando Resort. It also connects on its south end into a Lockheed Martin research facility.

== Route description ==
State Road 435 begins at a single-point urban interchange with SR 482. Not too long after, it intersects International Drive, followed by an interchange with Interstate 4 (I-4), and one of the entrances to Universal Orlando Resort. After this, State Road 435 continues for another 4.854 miles (7.812 km), passing by many hotels and resorts before its final major intersection with the tolled East–West Expressway, and then finally terminates at State Road 50 (Colonial Drive) soon after.

== Major intersections ==
The entire route is in Orange County.

Location	mi	km	Destinations	Notes
Orlando	0.000	0.000	SR 482 (Sand Lake Road) / Kirkman Road south	Interchange; continues south without designation
Orlando	0.886	1.426	International Drive to I-4 west – Tampa	
Orlando	1.400	2.253	I-4 – Orlando, Tampa	Northbound access to I-4 west via International Drive; exit 75 on I-4 (SR 400)
Orlo Vista	6.103	9.822	Old Winter Garden Road (CR 526)	
Orlo Vista	6.860	11.040	SR 408 – Orlando, Titusville, Ocoee	Exit 5 on SR 408 (East-West Expressway)
Pine Hills	7.101	11.428	SR 50 (Colonial Drive) / Governors Avenue north	Continues north without designation
1.000 mi = 1.609 km; 1.000 km = 0.621 mi

== Construction ==
Work began in April 2023 to rebuild the south terminus of Kirkman Road at Sand Lake Road to interface with Universal Epic Universe. A circle ramp will be constructed to feed into the new theme park and separate its traffic from traffic going into Lockheed Martin's research facility. Universal Orlando is contributing $160 million of the total $301 million construction costs. The intersection is planned to be completed in late 2024 ahead of the 2025 opening of Epic Universe.
