= Vineland, Florida =

Unincorporated community in Florida, US

Vineland
- Unincorporated community
- Location within the state of Florida Vineland (the United States)
- Coordinates: 28°23′43″N 81°30′11″W
- Country: United States
- State: Florida
- County: Orange
- Elevation: 115 ft (35 m)
- Time zone: UTC-5 (Eastern (EST))
  - Summer (DST): UTC-4 (EDT)
- ZIP codes: 32836
- Area code: 407
- GNIS ID: 295689

Vineland is an unincorporated community in southwest Orange County, Florida, United States, located just north of Interstate 4 along State Road 535 and continues along County Road 435, which is South Apopka Vineland Road. The name is no longer often used since the more well-known City of Lake Buena Vista lies just to the south and west. Orange County officially calls the area Buena Vista North or Orange Center, its original name. Mailing addresses for residents in the area are typically Orlando, Florida except many businesses in the area use Lake Buena Vista as their address. The area is most famous due to the name appearing on many major Orange County roads, including Apopka-Vineland Road, Winter Garden-Vineland Road, Kissimmee-Vineland Road and Taft-Vineland Road. There was also a small town which was abandoned in the 1960s called Vineland. An ACL Railway Depot, Housing, a schoolhouse, a church, the Vineland Cemetery, and many more community facilities were a part of the original town. These roads begin/terminate in the area known as Vineland and Lake Buena Vista, Florida.

Vineland is mainly residential, with a mosque Jama Masjid of Orlando, a synagogue, Southwest Orlando Jewish and four shopping center areas with 15 plus restaurants and several hotels and time share resorts, and the eastern entrance to Walt Disney World on Hotel Plaza Blvd. being other land uses. There are about 50 houses in the neighborhood, apartment complex, Mobile Home park (55 yr,+). It is part of the Orlando–Kissimmee Metropolitan Statistical Area.

The area was given the name Orange Center when it was platted in 1911. Previously it had the name Englewood, probably given to it by the Florida Midland Railroad. The name was changed to Vineland in 1924, supposedly due to confusion with Orange City, Florida. A Post Office opened at Orange Center in 1912, and was renamed Vineland in 1918. The Vineland Post Office closed in 1940.

In the 2000s and 2010s, many of the remnants of the Abandoned Town, including houses, buildings, and roads began being demolished and replaced with Hotels, Shopping Plazas, and other Businesses.

As of 2022, a few houses remain, some being abandoned, along with a small Confederate Cemetery, the original Schoolhouse (Now part of a Montessori School), and fragments of the original roads.
