= Orlo Vista, Florida =

Unincorporated area in Florida, US

Orlo Vista, Florida Orlovista CDP
- Census-designated place & Unincorporated community
- Location in Orange County and the state of Florida
- Coordinates: 28°32′39″N 81°27′46″W
- Country: United States
- State: Florida
- County: Orange
- Incorporated (city): 1927
- Unincorporated: 1929

Area
  - Total: 1.88 sq mi (4.87 km^{2})
  - Land: 1.84 sq mi (4.76 km^{2})
  - Water: 0.042 sq mi (0.11 km^{2})
- Elevation: 115 ft (35 m)

Population (2020)
  - Total: 6,806
  - Density: 3,702.2/sq mi (1,429.43/km^{2})
- Time zone: UTC-5 (Eastern (EST))
  - Summer (DST): UTC-4 (EDT)
- ZIP code: 32811
- Area codes: 407, 321, 689
- FIPS code: 12-53100
- GNIS feature ID: 2403380

Orlo Vista or Orlovista is an unincorporated community and census-designated place in Orange County, Florida, United States. While the spelling "Orlo Vista" is used by the U.S. Postal Service, the community is shown as Orlovista on federal maps. The population of the Orlovista census-designated place was 6,806 at the 2020 census. It is part of the Orlando–Kissimmee Metropolitan Statistical Area. The boundaries of the Orlovista CDP are West Colonial Drive (SF 50) on the north, Pine Hills Road on the east, Old Winter Garden Road (CR 526) and Carter Street at the Orlando city limits on the south, and Hiawassee Road on the west.

The name is a portmanteau of Orlando and "vista".

== Geography ==
According to the United States Census Bureau, the CDP has a total area of 1.9 square miles (4.9 km^{2}), of which 1.8 square miles (4.7 km^{2}) is land and 0.039 square miles (0.1 km^{2}) (2.40%) is water.

== Demographics ==
Historical population
Census	Pop.	Note	%±
1980	6,474		—
1990	5,990		−7.5%
2000	6,047		1.0%
2010	6,123		1.3%
2020	6,806		11.2%

As of the census of 2000, there were 6,047 people, 2,077 households, and 1,362 families residing in the CDP. The population density was 1,209.7/km^{2} (3,133.1/mi^{2}). There were 2,230 housing units at an average density of 446.1/km^{2} (1,155.4/mi^{2}). The racial makeup of the CDP was 58.91% White, 26.61% African American, 0.60% Native American, 3.54% Asian, 0.05% Pacific Islander, 6.50% from other races, and 3.80% from two or more races. Hispanic or Latino of any race were 14.78% of the population.

There were 2,077 households, out of which 34.8% had children under the age of 18 living with them, 41.0% were married couples living together, 17.4% had a female householder with no husband present, and 34.4% were non-families. 24.9% of all households were made up of individuals, and 5.0% had someone living alone who was 65 years of age or older. The average household size was 2.81 and the average family size was 3.38.

In the CDP, the population was spread out, with 27.7% under the age of 18, 11.1% from 18 to 24, 31.6% from 25 to 44, 19.4% from 45 to 64, and 10.2% who were 65 years of age or older. The median age was 32 years. For every 100 females, there were 99.8 males. For every 100 females age 18 and over, there were 96.0 males.

The median income for a household in the CDP was $34,795, and the median income for a family was $39,896. Males had a median income of $26,524 versus $20,512 for females. The per capita income for the CDP was $14,584. About 12.0% of families and 16.8% of the population were below the poverty line, including 20.6% of those under age 18 and 22.9% of those age 65 or over.
