= Florida State Road 527 =

State highway in Florida, United States

State Road 527
- SR 527 in red, CR 527 in blue, CR 527A in purple

Route information
- Maintained by FDOT
- Length: 9.8 mi (15.8 km)
- Existed: 1945–present

Major junctions
- South end: SR 482 / CR 527 near Belle Isle
- SR 408 in Orlando; SR 50 in Orlando
- North end: US 17 / US 92 in Winter Park

Location
- Country: United States
- State: Florida
- Counties: Orange

Highway system
- Florida State Highway System; Interstate; US; State; Former; Pre‑1945; Toll; Scenic
← SR 526	→ SR 528

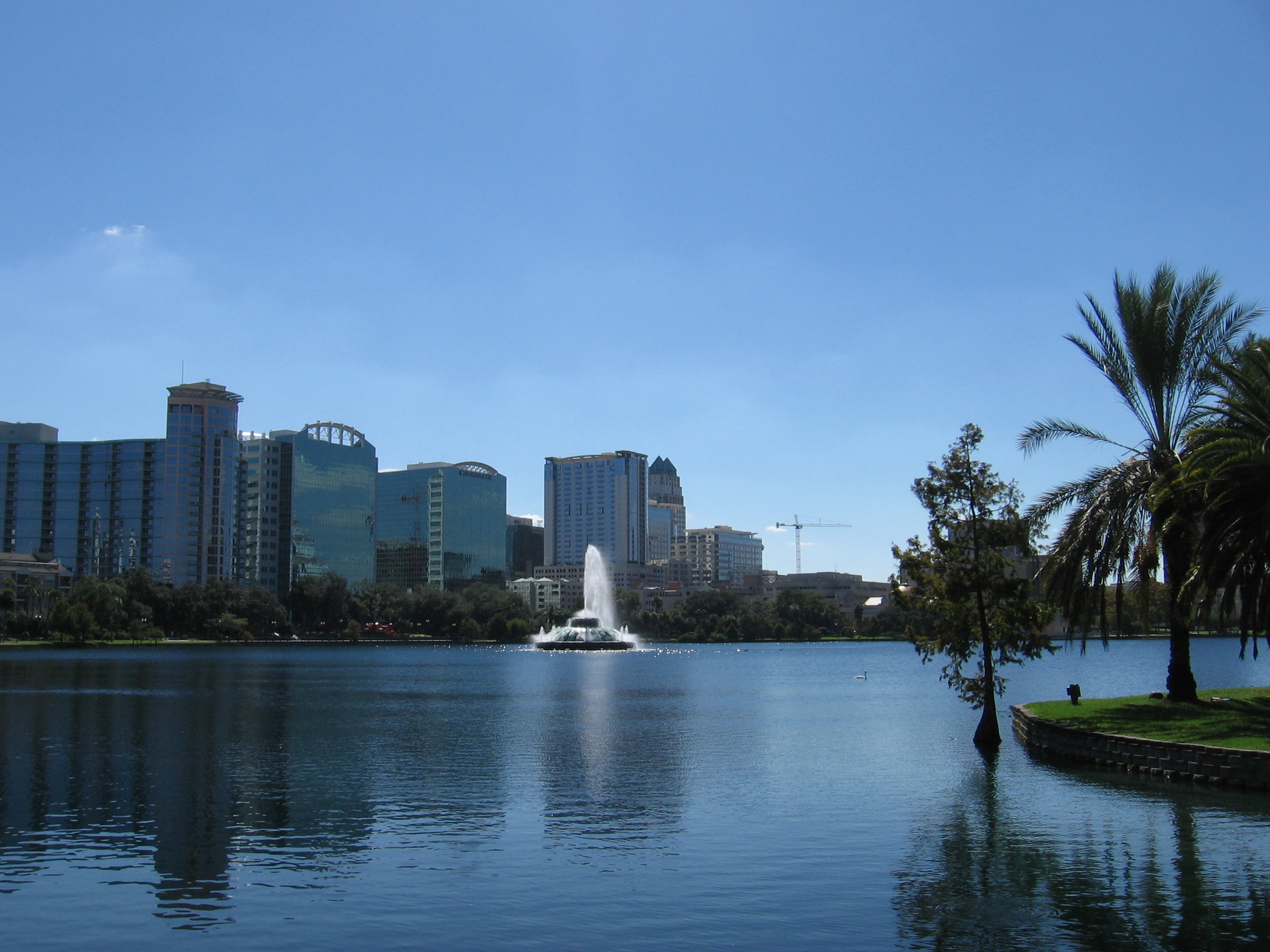
Lake Eola is one of the destinations along SR 527

State Road 527 (SR 527) is a major arterial road through the Orlando MSA extending 20 miles (32 km) through Orange County. Its southern terminus is at SR 482. Much of the route runs in close proximity to the SunRail commuter railroad line.

== Route description ==
Florida State Route 527 originates at an intersection with Sand Lake Road, also known as Florida State Route 482. It travels northward along South Orange Avenue, eventually passing through the center of downtown Orlando. Over Lake Lucerne, State Road 527 becomes a one-way pair with southbound SR 527 occupying Orange Avenue and northbound SR 527 occupying Rosalind Avenue. At Central Boulevard, South Orange Avenue and South Rosalind Avenue become North Orange Avenue and North Rosalind Avenue respectively, but north of Lake Eola, northbound SR 527 veers to the northwest onto North Magnolia Avenue. After crossing the SunRail Main Line, the one way pair ends and the route continues as North Orange Avenue in a north-easterly direction, crossing Orlando Avenue and terminating its ten and a half-mile journey its intersection with Fairbanks Avenue in Winter Park.

== History ==
SR 3A was defined by number in 1935 state law, chapter 17341, approved May 27, 1935:

- A certain road described as extending from the intersection of Orange Avenue and Fairbanks Avenue in Winter Park, then Southerly on Orange Avenue to its intersection with State Road 22 in the City of Orlando.

This was established to keep this section of former SR 3, which was to be bypassed around 1937 along the Orlando Shortcut (now Orlando Avenue) and Mills Avenue, a state road (and probably part of US 17/US 92). South of SR 22 (Colonial Drive), Orange Avenue was still part of SR 2.

SR 3A was extended in both directions by number in 1939 state law chapter 19049, approved May 12, 1939:

- Beginning at the point where the new location of State Road No. 3 intersects with the old location near the south line of the Town of Lake Maitland, thence along said old location thereof and along Park, Fairbanks and Orange Avenue in Winter Park, Orange Avenue in Orlando, and such route as may be selected by the State Road Department from Orange Avenue to Kuhl Avenue in Orlando, to the South city limits thereof, thence along the present Orlando and Kissimmee road to the county-line between Orange and Osceola Counties.

This kept the rest of old SR 3 in Winter Park in the State Road system, as well as old SR 2 south of SR 22 (Colonial Drive), which was bypassed around 1939.

Some state maps show SR 3A on old SR 2 north of Kissimmee in Osceola County and through Maitland into Seminole County, but it doesn't appear that these were added, unless they were added in 1941 when most of the through roads in Orange County were designated as State Roads.

In the 1945 renumbering, most of SR 3A became SR 527; SR 527 extended south into Osceola County but not north to Seminole County. The part between Orlando Avenue and the Park Avenue/Fairbanks Avenue intersection in Winter Park instead became part of SR 426, and was a gap in SR 527.

== Major intersections ==
The entire route is in Orange County.

Location	mi	km	Destinations	Notes
Pine Castle	0.000	0.000	SR 482 (McCoy Road / Sand Lake Road) / CR 527A south (Orange Avenue) – Orlando International Airport, Florida Mall	
Belle Isle	1.537	2.474	Oak Ridge Road (CR 506 west)	
Edgewood	1.695	2.728	Hoffner Avenue (CR 506 east)	
Orlando	5.640	9.077	To I-4 / Gore Street	north end of state maintenance
Orlando	5.9	9.5	To SR 408 west / Lucerne Circle North	
Orlando	6.1	9.8	To SR 408 east / I-4 east / Anderson Street	former SR 5098 east
Orlando	6.2	10.0	To I-4 / South Street	
Orlando	6.7	10.8	SR 526 (Robinson Street)	
Orlando	7.2	11.6	US 17 / US 92 / SR 50 (Colonial Drive / SR 600) to I-4 west	south end of state maintenance
Orlando	7.6	12.2	To I-4 / North Magnolia Avenue / South Ivanhoe Boulevard	
Orlando	8.6	13.8	To I-4 / Princeton Street	
Winter Park	9.8	15.8	US 17 / US 92 (Orlando Avenue / SR 15 / SR 600)	
1.000 mi = 1.609 km; 1.000 km = 0.621 mi: Route transition

== See also ==
- List of county roads in Orange County, Florida
- List of county roads in Osceola County, Florida
