= Wiscon, Florida =

- Census-designated place
- Coordinates: 28°32′27″N 82°27′43″W
- Country: United States
- State: Florida
- County: Hernando

Area
  - Total: 0.84 sq mi (2.18 km^{2})
  - Land: 0.84 sq mi (2.18 km^{2})
  - Water: 0 sq mi (0.00 km^{2})
- Elevation: 85 ft (26 m)

Population (2020)
  - Total: 681
  - Density: 809/sq mi (312.4/km^{2})
- Time zone: UTC-5 (Eastern (EST))
  - Summer (DST): UTC-4 (EDT)
- Area code: 352
- GNIS feature ID: 294978

Wiscon is an unincorporated community and census-designated place in Hernando County, Florida, United States. Its population was 681 as of the 2020 census. Florida State Road 50 passes through the community.

== Geography ==
Wiscon is located near the center of Hernando County and is bordered by Spring Hill to the south and South Brooksville to the east. Florida State Road 50 runs through the CDP, leading east 5 miles (8 km) to Brooksville, the county seat, and west 7 miles (11 km) to U.S. Route 19 at Weeki Wachee.

According to the U.S. Census Bureau, Wiscon CDP has an area of 0.843 square miles (2.18 km^{2}), all of it land.

== Demographics ==
Historical population
Census	Pop.	Note	%±
2020	681		—
U.S. Decennial Census

Wiscon first appeared as a census designated place in the 2010 U.S. census.
