= Green Pond, Florida =

Area in Polk County

Coordinates: 28°18′28″N 81°53′57″W

Green Pond is a small area in Polk County, Florida, United States, south of Clermont and north of Polk City, on the edge of the Green Swamp.

== Overview ==
The area was settled by many families in the early-to-mid-19th century. Some common surnames in the area were "Judy," "Grimmes," and "Roberts."

The family with the largest number of descendants in the area is likely "Judy." It is an Irish name dating back to the 14th century. In 1867, William Judy moved to the Green Pond area with one son (Jasper). Both married local Cherokee women. Many family descendants still raise oranges in the area. The site is also a trailhead for the General James A. Van Fleet State Trail.
