= Union Park, Florida =

Unincorporated area in Florida, US

- Census-designated place
- Location in Orange County and the state of Florida
- Coordinates: 28°34′07″N 81°14′45″W
- Country: United States
- State: Florida
- County: Orange

Area
  - Total: 2.88 sq mi (7.47 km^{2})
  - Land: 2.85 sq mi (7.38 km^{2})
  - Water: 0.035 sq mi (0.09 km^{2})
- Elevation: 75 ft (23 m)

Population (2020)
  - Total: 10,452
  - Density: 3,667.2/sq mi (1,415.91/km^{2})
- Time zone: UTC-5 (Eastern (EST))
  - Summer (DST): UTC-4 (EDT)
- ZIP codes: 32817, 32825
- Area codes: 407, 689
- FIPS code: 12-73075
- GNIS feature ID: 2402944

Union Park is a census-designated place (CDP) in Orange County, Florida, United States. The population was 10,452 at the 2020 census. It is part of the Orlando–Kissimmee Metropolitan Statistical Area. The ZIP codes for Union Park are 32817 and 32825. The community is southwest of the University of Central Florida.

== Geography ==
According to the United States Census Bureau, the CDP has a total area of 7.8 km^{2} (3.0 mi^{2}), of which 7.7 km^{2} (3.0 mi^{2}) is land and 0.1 km^{2} (0.04 mi^{2}) (0.99%) is water. The elevation is 82 feet (25 m) above sea level.

The boundaries of Union Park are North Dean Road to the west, the Econlockhatchee River to the west and north, J Blanchard Trail to the north, Rouse Road to the east, and Bloomfield Drive to the south.

== Demographics ==
Historical population
Census	Pop.	Note	%±
1970	2,827		—
1980	19,175		578.3%
1990	6,890		−64.1%
2000	10,191		47.9%
2010	9,765		−4.2%
2020	10,452		7.0%
Source: 1980 census boundaries included the separate community of University Park; the boundaries were scaled back significantly in the 1990 census.

=== 2020 census ===
As of the 2020 census, Union Park had a population of 10,452. The median age was 35.4 years. 19.1% of residents were under the age of 18 and 13.8% of residents were 65 years of age or older. For every 100 females there were 98.8 males, and for every 100 females age 18 and over there were 97.5 males age 18 and over.

100.0% of residents lived in urban areas, while 0.0% lived in rural areas.

There were 3,718 households in Union Park, of which 29.8% had children under the age of 18 living in them. Of all households, 40.9% were married-couple households, 19.1% were households with a male householder and no spouse or partner present, and 28.9% were households with a female householder and no spouse or partner present. About 20.8% of all households were made up of individuals and 6.6% had someone living alone who was 65 years of age or older.

There were 3,853 housing units, of which 3.5% were vacant. The homeowner vacancy rate was 1.0% and the rental vacancy rate was 3.2%.

Racial composition as of the 2020 census
Race	Number	Percent
White	4,614	44.1%
Black or African American	990	9.5%
American Indian and Alaska Native	81	0.8%
Asian	497	4.8%
Native Hawaiian and Other Pacific Islander	9	0.1%
Some other race	1,881	18.0%
Two or more races	2,380	22.8%
Hispanic or Latino (of any race)	5,249	50.2%

=== 2000 census ===
As of the 2000 census, there were 10,191 people, 3,644 households, and 2,507 families residing in the CDP. The population density was 1,316.0/km^{2} (3,411.5/mi^{2}). There were 3,791 housing units at an average density of 489.5/km^{2} (1,269.1/mi^{2}). The racial makeup of the CDP was 78.16% White, 4.94% African American, 0.32% Native American, 3.45% Asian, 0.06% Pacific Islander, 9.43% from other races, and 3.64% from two or more races. Hispanic or Latino of any race were 26.07% of the population. The ancestral population are German (12.3%), Irish (10.5%), English (8.1%), United States (6.8%), Italian (6.6%) and Polish (3.2%). 10.2% of the community's population is foreign born (6.4% Latin America, 1.8% Asia).

There were 3,644 households, out of which 33.3% had children under the age of 18 living with them, 50.6% were married couples living together, 13.2% had a female householder with no husband present, and 31.2% were non-families. 17.3% of all households were made up of individuals, and 3.6% had someone living alone who was 65 years of age or older. The average household size was 2.79 and the average family size was 3.19.

In the CDP, the population was spread out, with 24.9% under the age of 18, 14.8% from 18 to 24, 32.6% from 25 to 44, 19.0% from 45 to 64, and 8.7% who were 65 years of age or older. The median age was 31 years. For every 100 females, there were 100.5 males. For every 100 females age 18 and over, there were 97.9 males.

The median income for a household in the CDP was $44,174, and the median income for a family was $45,191. Males had a median income of $31,982 versus $23,384 for females. The per capita income for the CDP was $19,087. About 7.9% of families and 11.3% of the population were below the poverty line, including 13.9% of those under age 18 and 9.5% of those age 65 or over.

== Schools ==
Union Park has five schools: two elementary, one middle, one charter and one high school.

=== Public Schools ===
- Union Park Elementary School
- Lawton Chiles Elementary School
- Union Park Middle School
- University High School

=== Independent Schools ===
- Renaissance Charter School

== Neighboring communities ==
The nearest communities are Azalea Park (4 miles southwest), Goldenrod (5 miles northwest), Oviedo (8 miles north), Winter Park (8.5 miles northwest), Conway (8 miles southwest), and Bithlo (8 miles east). Downtown Orlando is 9 miles to the west.
