= University, Orange County, Florida =

Unincorporated area in Florida, US

- Census-designated place
- Location within the state of Florida University, Orange County, Florida (the United States)
- Coordinates: 28°35′24″N 81°11′57″W
- Country: United States
- State: Florida
- County: Orange

Area
  - Total: 9.4 sq mi (24.4 km^{2})
  - Land: 9.1 sq mi (23.5 km^{2})
  - Water: 0.35 sq mi (0.9 km^{2})
- Elevation: 72 ft (22 m)

Population (2010)
  - Total: 31,084
  - Density: 3,430/sq mi (1,320/km^{2})
- Time zone: UTC-5 (Eastern (EST))
  - Summer (DST): UTC-4 (EDT)
- ZIP codes: 32816, 32817
- Area codes: 407, 689
- GNIS ID: 2583384

University is a census-designated place (CDP) and unincorporated community in Orange County, Florida, United States, east of Orlando. The community is centered around the University of Central Florida (formerly known as Florida Technological University) and includes a location on its south side known as University Park. It is part of the Orlando–Kissimmee–Sanford, Florida Metropolitan Statistical Area.

== History and development ==
University was first designated as a CDP in the 2010 United States Census, at which point it had a population of 31,084. By the time of the 2020 census, the population had increased to 45,284.

In October 1990, the East-West Expressway rout was extended to State Road 50, immediately south of UCF, as part of a $100 million project.

By the mid-2000s, the wider area of East Orange County, located between the UCF and Orlando International Airport, was undergoing development. This included residential and retail construction, as well as the extension of the road from International Corporate Park to UCF.

In November 2012, the University Shoppes retail centre near the University of Central Florida was demolished to make way for a mixed-use development known as The Plaza at University. The changes included student accommodation with capacity for around 1,300 people, as well as retail space and a ten-storey parking garage. Several businesses relocated before the demolition.

The University CDP is also home to the Acrisure Bounce House, UCF's on-campus football stadium, which was formerly known as the FBC Mortgage Stadium prior to its rebranding in 2025. The stadium occupies a 25 acres (100,000 m^{2}) site and has a facility area of approximately 1,089,000 square feet (101,200 m^{2}) and seats up to 45,301 people. Construction started in 2006, with the stadium opening in September 2007. It has hosted several conference championship games in the past.

The CDP's university has undergone some improvements in the past. In 2020, a $41.1 million renovation project began with the aim of improving the Chemistry Building at the UCF. This included exterior and corridor enclosures, restroom fixtures and fittings, and updates to the building systems. The project is expected to be completed in August 2026. UCF is also carrying out a $31.6 million renovation of the Biological Sciences Building, involving updates the building's systems and interior finishes. Work on the project began in 2022, with completion to be expected in October 2026. In January 2018, UCF opened Research I, an 105,775 square feet (9,826.8 m^{2}) interdisciplinary research facility located on its main campus. Designed to support interdisciplinary research in fields including nanoscience, advanced materials, photonics and energy, the facility offers 79 laboratories and 84 individual offices. CREOL was founded in 1987. It first started out as a specialised centre but was subsequently developed into UCF's College of Optics and Photonics.

The safety of pedestrians along the roads surrounding UCF has been the subject of studies and infrastructure projects. Crash data from 2016 to 2021 recorded 126 collisions involving pedestrians and cyclists, seven of which were fatal. Subsequently in 2023, construction had begun on a $13 million pedestrian safety project near UCF. This project focuses on University Boulevard from Quadrangle Boulevard to Alafaya Trail, as well as the section of Alafaya between McCulloch Road and Research Parkway. The project included pedestrian fencing and media landscaping, wider pavements, improved intersections and high-visibility crosswalks, as well as upgraded traffic lighting, to discourage crossing between crosswalks.

In 2022, developers proposed replacing part of the 113,239 square feet (10,520.2 m^{2}) of office space that had previously been approved for development at the Quadrangle business park with student accommodation. In 2023, Orange County approved the conversion, allowing for up to 896 student beds. Later plans retained 40,000 square feet (3,700 m^{2}) of office space. The project began in 2024 and is being led by Trammell Web Partners Inc.

== Geography ==
The University CDP is located at 28.5900 north, 81.2045 west, or approximately 15 miles (24 km) east of downtown Orlando.

According to the U.S. Census Bureau, the CDP has a total area of 9.4 square miles (24.4 km^{2}), of which 9.1 square miles (23.5 km^{2}) is land and 0.35 square miles (0.9 km^{2}), or 3.50%, is water.

The University CDP is northeast of Union Park and north of Alafaya. The community is reachable by SR 408, SR 434, and SR 50 (Colonial Drive), which forms the CDP's southern edge.

== Demographics ==
Historical population
Census	Pop.	Note	%±
2010	31,084		—
2020	45,284		45.7%

University first appeared as a census designated place in the 2010 U.S. census.

=== Racial and ethnic composition ===
University CDP, Orange County, Florida – Racial and ethnic composition Note: the US Census treats Hispanic/Latino as an ethnic category. This table excludes Latinos from the racial categories and assigns them to a separate category. Hispanics/Latinos may be of any race.
Race / Ethnicity (NH = Non-Hispanic)	Pop 2010	Pop 2020	% 2010	% 2020
White alone (NH)	18,759	23,342	60.35%	51.55%
Black or African American alone (NH)	3,497	4,448	11.25%	9.82%
Native American or Alaska Native alone (NH)	84	76	0.27%	0.17%
Asian alone (NH)	1,691	3,051	5.44%	6.74%
Native Hawaiian or Pacific Islander alone (NH)	27	19	0.09%	0.04%
Other race alone (NH)	79	479	0.25%	1.06%
Mixed race or Multiracial (NH)	420	2,086	1.35%	4.61%
Hispanic or Latino (any race)	6,527	11,783	21.00%	26.02%
Total	31,084	45,284	100.00%	100.00%

=== 2020 census ===
As of the 2020 United States census, there were 45,284 people, 7,586 households, and 3,592 families residing in the CDP.

As of the 2010 United States census, there were 31,084 people, 6,738 households, and 3,280 families residing in the CDP.

== Culture and community ==
Memory Mall is an open space on the UFC campus that is used for student gatherings, outdoor events, and football-game tailgating. It is also used for commemorations of veterans at the Veterans Commemoration Site. In 2023, more than 1,000 American flags were displayed there to represent military-connected UCF students.

Spirit Splash is a UCF Homecoming tradition that began in the 1990s. It is described to attract thousands of students to the Reflecting Pond each year for the Pond Rush and accompanying performances.

== Education ==
The University of Central Florida is within the CDP.

The K-12 school district is Orange County Public Schools.
