= Florida State Road 438 =

State highway in Florida, United States

State Road 438
- SR 438 in red, SR 437 in purple, former segments of SR 438 in grey

Route information
- Maintained by FDOT
- Length: 10.144 mi (16.325 km)

Major junctions
- West end: SR 429 in Ocoee
- SR 423 in Orlando; US 441 in Orlando
- East end: SR 15 in Orlando

Location
- Country: United States
- State: Florida
- Counties: Orange

Highway system
- Florida State Highway System; Interstate; US; State; Former; Pre‑1945; Toll; Scenic
| ← SR 437 | → US 441 |
| ← SR 436 | → SR 438 |

State Road 438 (SR 438) is an east–west state highway in Orange County, Florida. Its western terminus is an interchange with State Road 429 (Western Beltway) in Ocoee and it runs east to U.S. 17/92/State Road 15 in Orlando. The road formerly extended further west to CR 455 near Montverde and further east to U.S. Route 17 (US 17) and US 92 in Orlando, for a historic total mileage of 22.00 miles (35.41 km). The current route is truncated to 10.144 miles (16.325 km).

A 0.106-mile-long (0.171 km) segment of the road in Ocoee is also officially designated State Road 437 (SR 437). A former segment of this state road is now designated County Road 437 (CR 437).

== Route description ==
SR 438 officially begins in Winter Garden at an interchange with SR 429 (Western Expressway). The road formerly continued west, but this is not signed and the mileage has been removed from FDOT databases.

At Ocoee Apopka Road and HM Bowness Road, it supports the former northern terminus of SR 439 and the southern terminus SR 437. SR 438 runs concurrent with SR 437 for one block. Then at Silver Star Road, SR 437 ends (with CR 437 continuing north) and SR 438 turns to the east along Silver Star Road. It goes around Starke Lake. Leaving Ocoee, it next enters unincorporated Pine Hills. SR 438 is now six lanes wide. It started to widen east of Clarke Road. At the easternmost point of Pine Hills, it forms a fork at SR 416. SR 438 becomes Princeton Street and took away a lane in each direction. East of Mercy Drive, SR 438 enters Orlando. The next traffic light forms the intersection of John Young Parkway, with the elevation dropping below 100 feet (30 m). Widening to six lanes again, it meets US 441, as it nears Interstate 4 (I-4). After splitting into a one-way pair along Princeton Avenue (eastbound) and Smith Street (westbound). The road's official eastern terminus is just west of Rio Grande Avenue.

The road becomes a one-way pair as it enters a historic district. Before Interstate 4, it intersects SR 424, a four lane alternate route of US 441. SR 438 is now four lanes wide and meets Interstate 4 as a diamond interchange. As it approaches the Orlando Science Center, it meets SR 527. SR 438 makes three bends to get to its eastern terminus, US 92/US 17 in Orlando.

== Major intersections ==
The entire route is in Orange County.

| Location | mi | km | Destinations | Notes |
|---|---|---|---|---|
| Ocoee | 0.000 | 0.000 | SR 429 to Florida's Turnpike / Plant Road west – Tampa, Apopka | Exit 24 on SR 429 (Western Beltway); state highway formerly continued west |
| Ocoee | 0.399 | 0.642 | Bowness Road / Franklin Street | Southern terminus of SR 437 |
| Ocoee | 0.505 | 0.813 | CR 437 north (Ocoee-Apopka Road) | Northern terminus of SR 437 |
| Pine Hills | 4.383 | 7.054 | CR 435 north (Apopka-Vineland Road) | Western terminus of CR 435 concurrency |
| Pine Hills | 5.292 | 8.517 | CR 435 south (Hiawassee Road) | Eastern terminus of CR 435 concurrency |
| Pine Hills | 6.784 | 10.918 | Pine Hills Road (CR 431) | |
| Orlando | 7.753 | 12.477 | SR 416 east (Silver Star Road) | western terminus of SR 416 |
| Orlando | 9.289 | 14.949 | SR 423 (John Young Parkway) | |
| Orlando | 9.918 | 15.961 | US 441 (Orange Blossom Trail) to I-4 | Road is unsigned SR 500 |
| Orlando | 10.144 | 16.325 | Rio Grande Avenue / Princeton Street east | State highway formerly continued east |
1.000 mi = 1.609 km; 1.000 km = 0.621 mi: Concurrency terminus; Incomplete access; Tolled
