= Ridge Manor, Florida =

- Census-designated place
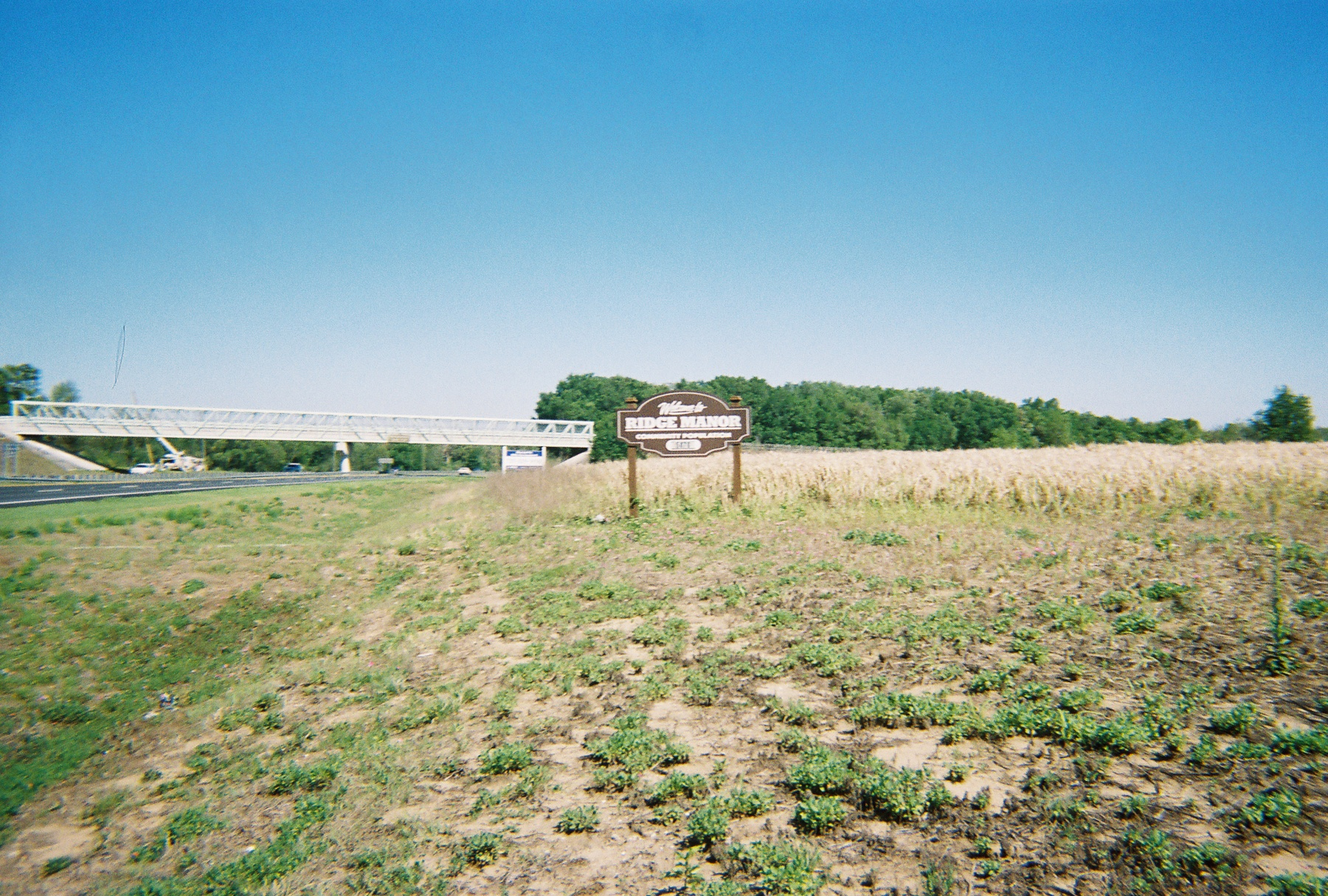
- US 98-SR 50 enter Ridge Manor before crossing under the Withlacoochee State Trail.

- Location in Hernando County and the state of Florida
- Coordinates: 28°30′15″N 82°11′05″W
- Country: United States
- State: Florida
- County: Hernando

Area
  - Total: 9.04 sq mi (23.41 km^{2})
  - Land: 8.63 sq mi (22.35 km^{2})
  - Water: 0.41 sq mi (1.07 km^{2})
- Elevation: 62 ft (19 m)

Population (2020)
  - Total: 4,743
  - Density: 549.7/sq mi (212.24/km^{2})
- Time zone: UTC-5 (Eastern (EST))
  - Summer (DST): UTC-4 (EDT)
- ZIP codes: 33523, 33597, 34602
- FIPS code: 12-60325
- GNIS feature ID: 2403474

Ridge Manor is a census-designated place (CDP) in Hernando County, Florida, United States. As of the 2020 census, Ridge Manor had a population of 4,743.

== Geography ==
Ridge Manor is located in eastern Hernando County. It is bordered to the south by Lacoochee in Pasco County. The north-flowing Withlacoochee River winds through the southern and western parts of Ridge Manor and in October 2024 caused "unprecedented flooding" when many days after Hurricane Milton it continued to rise and crest.

U.S. Route 301 runs through the east side of Ridge Manor, leading north 12 miles (19 km) to Bushnell and south 10 miles (16 km) to Dade City. U.S. Route 98 crosses the western side of Ridge Manor, leading west 13 miles (21 km) to Brooksville, the Hernando County seat, and south 10 miles to Dade City. Florida State Road 50 runs across the northern part of Ridge Manor, connecting US 98 and 301. SR 50 leads east 20 miles (32 km) to Mascotte and west with US 98 to Brooksville. Interstate 75 is 3 miles (5 km) west of Ridge Manor, with access via US 98 / SR 50 at Exit 301. A portion of Ridge Manor along US 98 / SR 50 in the vicinity the Withlacoochee State Trail (originally the South Florida Railroad Pemberton Ferry Branch) was the location of the ghost town of Rital.

According to the United States Census Bureau, the CDP has a total area of 9.0 square miles (23.4 km^{2}), of which 8.6 square miles (22.4 km^{2}) are land and 0.42 square miles (1.1 km^{2}), or 4.55%, are water.

== Demographics ==
Historical population
Census	Pop.	Note	%±
2020	4,743		—
U.S. Decennial Census

=== 2020 census ===
As of the 2020 census, Ridge Manor had a population of 4,743. The median age was 47.0 years. 18.6% of residents were under the age of 18 and 24.3% of residents were 65 years of age or older. For every 100 females there were 103.0 males, and for every 100 females age 18 and over there were 102.3 males age 18 and over.

0.0% of residents lived in urban areas, while 100.0% lived in rural areas.

There were 1,974 households in Ridge Manor, of which 22.6% had children under the age of 18 living in them. Of all households, 46.1% were married-couple households, 22.2% were households with a male householder and no spouse or partner present, and 24.2% were households with a female householder and no spouse or partner present. About 31.2% of all households were made up of individuals and 16.5% had someone living alone who was 65 years of age or older.

There were 2,266 housing units, of which 12.9% were vacant. The homeowner vacancy rate was 2.0% and the rental vacancy rate was 8.1%.

Racial composition as of the 2020 census
Race	Number	Percent
White	3,893	82.1%
Black or African American	148	3.1%
American Indian and Alaska Native	20	0.4%
Asian	26	0.5%
Native Hawaiian and Other Pacific Islander	0	0.0%
Some other race	220	4.6%
Two or more races	436	9.2%
Hispanic or Latino (of any race)	636	13.4%

=== 2000 census ===
As of the census of 2000, there were 4,108 people, 1,712 households, and 1,225 families residing in the CDP. The population density was 471.2 inhabitants per square mile (181.9/km^{2}). There were 2,099 housing units at an average density of 240.8 per square mile (93.0/km^{2}). The racial makeup of the CDP was 95.52% White, 1.85% African American, 0.49% Native American, 0.29% Asian, 1.07% from other races, and 0.78% from two or more races. Hispanic or Latino of any race were 2.87% of the population.

There were 1,712 households, out of which 24.2% had children under the age of 18 living with them, 59.5% were married couples living together, 7.7% had a female householder with no husband present, and 28.4% were non-families. 22.5% of all households were made up of individuals, and 11.6% had someone living alone who was 65 years of age or older. The average household size was 2.40 and the average family size was 2.79.

In the CDP, the population was spread out, with 21.4% under the age of 18, 5.6% from 18 to 24, 23.6% from 25 to 44, 25.9% from 45 to 64, and 23.6% who were 65 years of age or older. The median age was 45 years. For every 100 females, there were 96.9 males. For every 100 females age 18 and over, there were 93.1 males.

The median income for a household in the CDP was $30,875, and the median income for a family was $33,724. Males had a median income of $30,421 versus $24,492 for females. The per capita income for the CDP was $18,722. About 9.9% of families and 15.1% of the population were below the poverty line, including 29.0% of those under age 18 and 6.5% of those age 65 or over.

== See also ==
- List of census-designated places in Florida
- Hernando County Library
