= Florida State Road 526 =

State highway in Florida, United States

State Road 526
- SR 526 highlighted in red

Route information
- Maintained by FDOT
- Length: 3.306 mi (5.320 km)

Major junctions
- West end: US 17 / US 92 / US 441 in Orlando
- East end: Crystal Lake Drive in Orlando

Location
- Country: United States
- State: Florida
- Counties: Orange

Highway system
- Florida State Highway System; Interstate; US; State; Former; Pre‑1945; Toll; Scenic
← SR 524	→ SR 527

State Road 526 (SR 526) is a 3.306-mile-long (5.320 km) east–west route in the Orlando, Orange County. It runs from State Road 50 in Ocoee, to State Road 15, the frontage roads of State Road 408, in Orlando. After the western terminus of SR 526, State Road 50, it becomes W Washington St. Between US 441 and the western terminus, it is known as County Road 526, and locally known as Old Winter Garden Road. It crosses State Road 408 twice. At the overpass of Interstate 4, State Road 526 runs north–south for 1 block, specifically northbound along North Garland Avenue and southbound along North Hughey Avenue. It then heads into Downtown Orlando via Robinson Street and follows the northern shore of Lake Eola. SR 526 next intersects State Road 15. At the Orlando Executive Airport, it heads north–south and then ends at State Road 15, the frontage roads of State Road 408.

== Major intersections ==
The entire route is in Orlando, Orange County.

mi	km	Destinations	Notes
0.000	0.000	US 17 / US 92 / US 441 (Orange Blossom Trail)	Road is unsigned SR 500 / SR 600
0.913	1.469	To I-4	Access via frontage roads
1.223	1.968	SR 527 south (Orange Avenue)	
1.414	2.276	SR 527 north (Rosalind Avenue) to SR 50 west	
2.118	3.409	SR 15 (Mills Avenue)	
3.306	5.320	Maguire Boulevard north / Crystal Lake Drive south	
1.000 mi = 1.609 km; 1.000 km = 0.621 mi
