= Timber Pines, Florida =

- Census-designated place
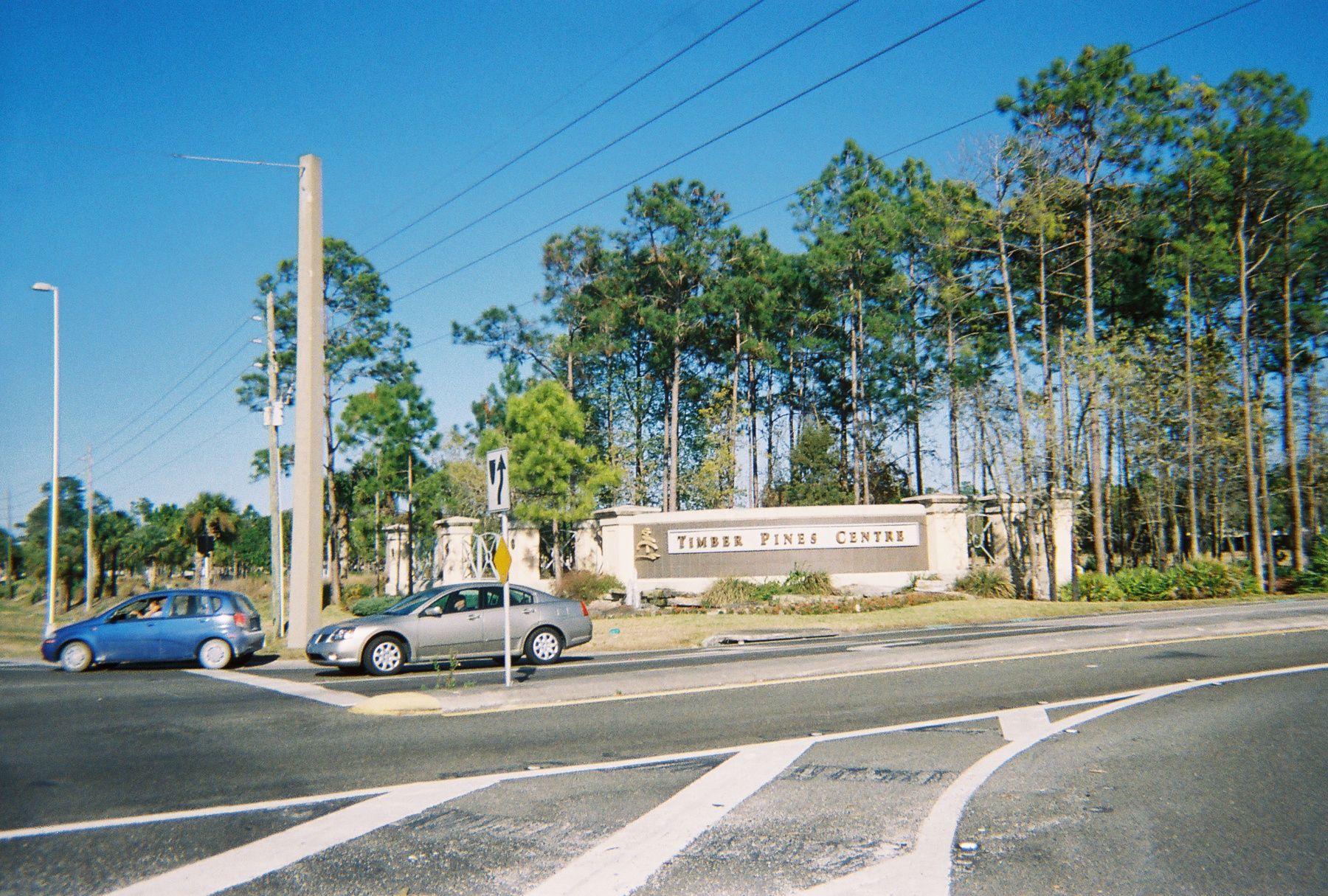
- US 19 and Pine Forest Drive

- Location in Hernando County and the state of Florida
- Coordinates: 28°28′08″N 82°35′59″W
- Country: United States
- State: Florida
- County: Hernando

Area
  - Total: 2.29 sq mi (5.92 km^{2})
  - Land: 2.20 sq mi (5.70 km^{2})
  - Water: 0.085 sq mi (0.22 km^{2})
- Elevation: 49 ft (15 m)

Population (2020)
  - Total: 5,163
  - Density: 2,347.6/sq mi (906.41/km^{2})
- Time zone: UTC-5 (Eastern (EST))
  - Summer (DST): UTC-4 (EDT)
- ZIP code: 34606
- Area code: 352
- FIPS code: 12-71867
- GNIS feature ID: 2402934

Timber Pines is a census-designated place (CDP) in Hernando County, Florida, United States. As of the 2020 census, Timber Pines had a population of 5,163.

== Geography ==
Timber Pines is located in southwestern Hernando County. It is bordered to the north, east, and south by Spring Hill and to the west by U.S. Route 19, which leads north 4 miles (6 km) to Weeki Wachee and south 9 miles (14 km) to Hudson. Brooksville, the Hernando County seat, is 16 miles (26 km) to the northeast.

According to the United States Census Bureau, the Timber Pines CDP has a total area of 2.3 square miles (6.0 km^{2}), of which 2.2 square miles (5.8 km^{2}) are land and 0.1 square miles (0.2 km^{2}), or 3.63%, are water.

== Demographics ==
Historical population
Census	Pop.	Note	%±
2020	5,163		—
U.S. Decennial Census

=== 2020 census ===
As of the 2020 census, Timber Pines had a population of 5,163. The median age was 75.2 years. 1.6% of residents were under the age of 18 and 83.1% of residents were 65 years of age or older. For every 100 females there were 80.0 males, and for every 100 females age 18 and over there were 80.1 males age 18 and over.

100.0% of residents lived in urban areas, while 0.0% lived in rural areas.

There were 3,157 households in Timber Pines, of which 4.0% had children under the age of 18 living in them. Of all households, 50.7% were married-couple households, 15.3% were households with a male householder and no spouse or partner present, and 30.2% were households with a female householder and no spouse or partner present. About 39.9% of all households were made up of individuals and 35.8% had someone living alone who was 65 years of age or older.

There were 3,757 housing units, of which 16.0% were vacant. The homeowner vacancy rate was 1.3% and the rental vacancy rate was 19.1%.

Racial composition as of the 2020 census
Race	Number	Percent
White	4,995	96.7%
Black or African American	22	0.4%
American Indian and Alaska Native	1	0.0%
Asian	10	0.2%
Native Hawaiian and Other Pacific Islander	6	0.1%
Some other race	19	0.4%
Two or more races	110	2.1%
Hispanic or Latino (of any race)	129	2.5%

=== 2000 census ===
As of the 2000 census, there were 5,840 people, 3,229 households, and 2,408 families residing in the CDP. The population density was 2,456.3 inhabitants per square mile (948.4/km^{2}). There were 3,551 housing units at an average density of 1,493.5 per square mile (576.6/km^{2}). The racial makeup of the CDP was 98.94% White, 0.38% African American, 0.05% Native American, 0.27% Asian, 0.09% from other races, and 0.27% from two or more races. Hispanic or Latino of any race were 0.63% of the population.

There were 3,229 households, out of which 0.9% had children under the age of 18 living with them, 72.7% were married couples living together, 1.4% had a female householder with no husband present, and 25.4% were non-families. 23.3% of all households were made up of individuals, and 21.2% had someone living alone who was 65 years of age or older. The average household size was 1.81 and the average family size was 2.05.

In the CDP, the population was spread out, with 1.0% under the age of 18, 0.5% from 18 to 24, 1.5% from 25 to 44, 18.5% from 45 to 64, and 78.4% who were 65 years of age or older. The median age was 72 years. For every 100 females, there were 84.8 males. For every 100 females age 18 and over, there were 84.3 males.

The median income for a household in the CDP was $43,666, and the median income for a family was $50,526. Males had a median income of $20,278 versus $50,078 for females. The per capita income for the CDP was $34,900. About 1.5% of families and 2.6% of the population were below the poverty line, including 100.0% of those under age 18 and 1.4% of those age 65 or over.
