= North Brooksville, Florida =

- Census-designated place
- Location in Hernando County and the state of Florida
- Coordinates: 28°34′28″N 82°22′40″W
- Country: United States
- State: Florida
- County: Hernando

Area
  - Total: 6.54 sq mi (16.93 km^{2})
  - Land: 6.52 sq mi (16.89 km^{2})
  - Water: 0.015 sq mi (0.04 km^{2})
- Elevation: 157 ft (48 m)

Population (2020)
  - Total: 3,506
  - Density: 537.7/sq mi (207.59/km^{2})
- Time zone: UTC-5 (Eastern (EST))
  - Summer (DST): UTC-4 (EDT)
- ZIP code: 34601
- Area code: 352
- FIPS code: 12-49237
- GNIS feature ID: 2403344

North Brooksville is a census-designated place (CDP) in Hernando County, Florida, United States. As of the 2020 census, North Brooksville had a population of 3,506. It is a suburb included in the Tampa-St. Petersburg-Clearwater, Florida Metropolitan Statistical Area.

== Geography ==
North Brooksville is located in east-central Hernando County. It borders the northwest, north, and northeast sides of the city of Brooksville, the Hernando County seat.

U.S. Route 98 runs through the western part of North Brooksville, leading south into Brooksville and northwest 20 miles (32 km) to Homosassa Springs. U.S. Route 41 crosses the central reach of North Brooksville, leading south into Brooksville and north 19 miles (31 km) to Inverness.

According to the United States Census Bureau, the CDP has a total area of 6.6 square miles (17.1 km^{2}), of which 0.02 square miles (0.05 km^{2}), or 0.29%, are water.

== Demographics ==
Historical population
Census	Pop.	Note	%±
2020	3,506		—
U.S. Decennial Census

=== 2020 census ===
As of the 2020 census, North Brooksville had a population of 3,506. The median age was 49.5 years. 19.1% of residents were under the age of 18 and 23.4% of residents were 65 years of age or older. For every 100 females there were 97.3 males, and for every 100 females age 18 and over there were 96.7 males age 18 and over.

66.3% of residents lived in urban areas, while 33.7% lived in rural areas.

There were 1,374 households in North Brooksville, of which 25.1% had children under the age of 18 living in them. Of all households, 42.6% were married-couple households, 18.0% were households with a male householder and no spouse or partner present, and 28.2% were households with a female householder and no spouse or partner present. About 26.1% of all households were made up of individuals and 14.2% had someone living alone who was 65 years of age or older.

There were 1,597 housing units, of which 14.0% were vacant. The homeowner vacancy rate was 3.7% and the rental vacancy rate was 11.1%.

Racial composition as of the 2020 census
Race	Number	Percent
White	2,873	81.9%
Black or African American	233	6.6%
American Indian and Alaska Native	24	0.7%
Asian	20	0.6%
Native Hawaiian and Other Pacific Islander	2	0.1%
Some other race	65	1.9%
Two or more races	289	8.2%
Hispanic or Latino (of any race)	274	7.8%

=== 2000 census ===
As of the census of 2000, there were 1,461 people, 551 households, and 359 families residing in the CDP. The population density was 528.7 inhabitants per square mile (204.1/km^{2}). There were 636 housing units at an average density of 230.2 per square mile (88.9/km^{2}). The racial makeup of the CDP was 90.76% White, 5.48% African American, 0.55% Native American, 0.75% Asian, 0.27% from other races, and 2.19% from two or more races. Hispanic or Latino of any race were 3.01% of the population.

There were 551 households, out of which 31.8% had children under the age of 18 living with them, 44.6% were married couples living together, 14.9% had a female householder with no husband present, and 34.7% were non-families. 28.1% of all households were made up of individuals, and 10.2% had someone living alone who was 65 years of age or older. The average household size was 2.50 and the average family size was 3.06.

In the CDP, the population was spread out, with 25.7% under the age of 18, 8.3% from 18 to 24, 25.8% from 25 to 44, 22.0% from 45 to 64, and 18.3% who were 65 years of age or older. The median age was 38 years. For every 100 females, there were 86.1 males. For every 100 females age 18 and over, there were 86.3 males.

The median income for a household in the CDP was $27,917, and the median income for a family was $37,455. Males had a median income of $24,728 versus $20,781 for females. The per capita income for the CDP was $13,531. About 7.1% of families and 13.7% of the population were below the poverty line, including 4.7% of those under age 18 and 36.0% of those age 65 or over.
