= Hernando County, Florida =

County in Florida, United States

- County
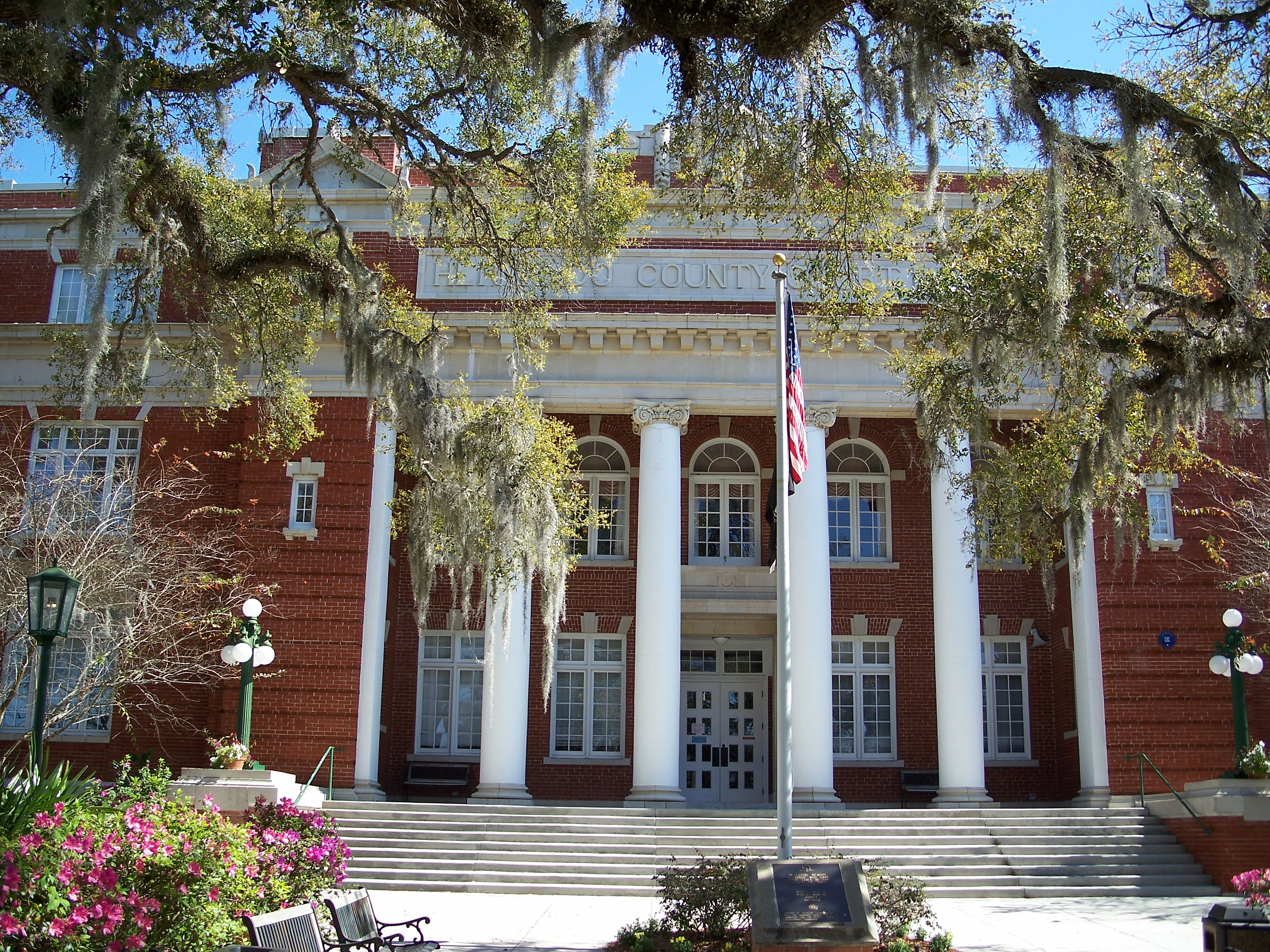
- Hernando County Courthouse

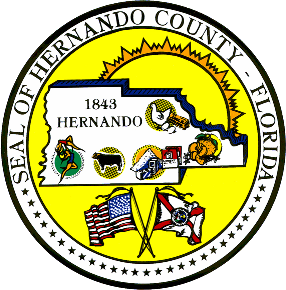
- Seal

- Location within the U.S. state of Florida
- Coordinates: 28°33′N 82°28′W
- Country: United States
- State: Florida
- Founded: February 24, 1843
- Named for: Hernando de Soto
- Seat: Brooksville
- Largest community: Spring Hill

Area
  - Total: 589 sq mi (1,530 km^{2})
  - Land: 473 sq mi (1,230 km^{2})
  - Water: 116 sq mi (300 km^{2}) 19.8%

Population (2020)
  - Total: 194,515
  - Estimate (2025): 221,701 ▲
  - Density: 411/sq mi (159/km^{2})
- Time zone: UTC−5 (Eastern)
  - Summer (DST): UTC−4 (EDT)
- Congressional district: 15th
- Website: www.hernandocounty.us

Hernando County (Spanish: Condado de Hernando) is a county located on the west central coast of the U.S. state of Florida. As of the 2020 census, the population was 194,515. Its county seat is Brooksville, and its largest community is Spring Hill. Hernando County is included in the Tampa-St. Petersburg-Clearwater, FL Metropolitan Statistical Area. It is also part of the Nature Coast of Florida.

== History ==
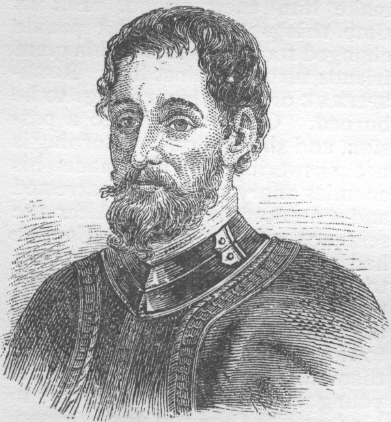
Spanish explorer Hernando de Soto

In 1767, a group of Upper Creeks from Eufaula, Alabama, migrated to the Tampa Bay region and settled in what is now Hernando County. They would eventually become a part of the Muskogee speaking Seminole.

=== Early European Pioneers and Founding ===
Roughly 100 settlers and over 50 slaves arrived in what would become Hernando County in February 1842. Fort DeSoto was soon established in the northeast edge of present-day Brooksville to protect these settlers in the area from Native Americans. The fort became a small community center, trading post, and way station on the route to Tampa. Further settlements started to grow near the fort beginning around 1845; two towns developed, Melendez and Pierceville, which would later merge to create Brooksville in 1856.

Then encompassing a significantly larger area of west central Florida than it does today, Hernando County was officially established on February 27, 1843, two years prior to Florida's admission into the Union. It was created from portions of Alachua, Hillsborough and Orange Counties and included all of present-day Citrus and Pasco Counties. Named for Spanish explorer Hernando de Soto, whose name has also been honored in DeSoto County, Hernando County was briefly renamed Benton County in 1844 for Missouri Senator Thomas Hart Benton, a strong supporter of territorial expansion who aided in the county's creation. However, Benton fell out of favor with the county's residents later in the decade due to his decision to support the Missouri Compromise and the overall reversal of his stance on slavery, and the county's name reverted in 1850.

In December 1854, the legislature designated the small port town of Bayport the county seat. Residents living in the eastern section of the county instead desired a more central place for the county government, and by 1855, voters had selected an inland site within five miles (8.0 km) of the center of the county at the town of Melendez. In 1856, the citizens of Hernando County chose to rename the town, their new County Seat, Brooksville in honor of South Carolina Representative Preston Brooks, who in the same year beat fierce abolitionist Massachusetts Senator Charles Sumner with a cane in the Senate chambers, winning the Congressman great renown in the South.

In 1855, town founder Joseph Hale donated land for a county courthouse in the center of present-day Brooksville. Soon thereafter, the structure was completed.

=== American Civil War ===
During the Civil War, Hernando County primarily contributed foodstuffs, cotton, and lumber to the Confederacy. Although Union ships imposed a blockade on the port of Bayport, runners enjoyed a great deal of success—enough to lead the Union in June 1864 to order some 150–250 troop to destroy Confederate stockpiles in the county. In early July, the expeditions, including 2 companies from the 2nd U.S. Florida Cavalry, marched northward from Anclote River to Brooksville, meeting some resistance from assembled Confederate troops hastily organized to protect the city. The Federal troops won this engagement (known locally as the Brooksville Raid and marched to Bayport, where they and an auxiliary force landing from gunboats sacked Rebel operations. The skirmish between Union raiders and local Confederates is reenacted annually in the county.

At least one unit that fought in the Civil War was mustered in Hernando County. The Hernando County "Wildcats," formed Company C of 3rd Florida Infantry Regiment. The unit was captained by Walter Terry Saxon who was reportedly well liked by his men. He was paid roughly $20,000 for work surveying the Everglades. He used most of this money to arm and equip the Wildcats.

=== Reconstruction ===
Despite many citizens', including new immigrants, attempts at making Hernando an open and welcoming place, the county became one of the many Florida plantation counties that was a hotbed for Ku Klux Klan activity. Arthur St. Clair, a minister, was lynched in Hernando County, Florida, in 1877 for performing the wedding of a black man and white woman.

The county courthouse was destroyed by a fire on September 29, 1877. On June 2, 1887, the Florida State Legislature divided Hernando County into three independent counties: Pasco County to the south, Citrus County to the north, and Hernando County in the middle. Since then, Hernando County's borders have remained unchanged.

== Geography ==
According to the U.S. Census Bureau, the county has a total area of 589 square miles (1,530 km^{2}), of which 473 square miles (1,230 km^{2}) is land and 116 square miles (300 km^{2}) (19.8%) is water. According to the World Atlas USA, Hernando County is the geographic center of Florida. Elevation in the county ranges from mean sea level along the Gulf coast to its highest natural point of 269 feet at Chinsegut Hill.

=== Adjacent counties ===
- Citrus County, Florida - north
- Sumter County, Florida - east
- Pasco County, Florida - south

=== National protected area ===
- Chassahowitzka National Wildlife Refuge

=== State protected areas ===
Weeki Wachee Springs

Withlacoochee State Forest

=== Other points of interest ===
- Croom Motorcycle Park
- Bayport Park
- Brooksville Railroad Depot Museum
- Delta Woods Park
- Weeki Wachee Preserve
- Veterans Memorial Park
- Tom Varn Park
- Annutteliga Hammock

== Demographics ==
Historical population
Census	Pop.	Note	%±
1850	926		—
1860	1,200		29.6%
1870	2,938		144.8%
1880	4,248		44.6%
1890	2,476		−41.7%
1900	3,638		46.9%
1910	4,997		37.4%
1920	4,548		−9.0%
1930	4,948		8.8%
1940	5,641		14.0%
1950	6,693		18.6%
1960	11,205		67.4%
1970	17,004		51.8%
1980	44,469		161.5%
1990	101,115		127.4%
2000	130,802		29.4%
2010	172,778		32.1%
2020	194,515		12.6%
2025 (est.)	221,701	▲	14.0%
U.S. Decennial Census; 1790-1960 1900-1990; 1990-2000 2010-2015 2019

=== Racial and ethnic composition ===
Hernando County, Florida – Racial and ethnic composition Note: the US Census treats Hispanic/Latino as an ethnic category. This table excludes Latinos from the racial categories and assigns them to a separate category. Hispanics/Latinos may be of any race.
Race / Ethnicity (NH = Non-Hispanic)	Pop 1980	Pop 1990	Pop 2000	Pop 2010	Pop 2020	% 1980	% 1990	% 2000	% 2010	% 2020
White alone (NH)	40,691	93,701	116,670	141,847	144,060	91.50%	92.67%	89.20%	82.10%	74.06%
Black or African American alone (NH)	2,736	3,812	5,149	8,165	9,507	6.15%	3.77%	3.94%	4.73%	4.89%
Native American or Alaska Native alone (NH)	78	237	361	483	553	0.18%	0.23%	0.28%	0.28%	0.28%
Asian alone (NH)	98	382	820	1,815	2,566	0.22%	0.38%	0.63%	1.05%	1.32%
Native Hawaiian or Pacific Islander alone (NH)	x	x	23	62	86	x	x	0.02%	0.04%	0.04%
Other race alone (NH)	32	21	111	244	868	0.07%	0.02%	0.08%	0.14%	0.45%
Mixed race or Multiracial (NH)	x	x	1,081	2,366	7,830	x	x	0.83%	1.37%	4.03%
Hispanic or Latino (any race)	834	2,962	6,587	17,796	29,045	1.88%	2.93%	5.04%	10.30%	14.93%
Total	44,469	101,115	130,802	172,778	194,515	100.00%	100.00%	100.00%	100.00%	100.00%

A map of racial demographics in Hernando County, Florida by Census tract Legend: Non-Hispanic White 50–60% 60–70% 70–80% 80–90% >90%

=== 2020 census ===
As of the 2020 census, the county had a population of 194,515 and a median age of 49.7 years. 18.4% of residents were under the age of 18 and 28.1% of residents were 65 years of age or older. For every 100 females there were 92.5 males, and for every 100 females age 18 and over there were 90.4 males age 18 and over.

The racial makeup of the county was 78.4% White, 5.3% Black or African American, 0.4% American Indian and Alaska Native, 1.4% Asian, 0.1% Native Hawaiian and Pacific Islander, 4.2% from some other race, and 10.3% from two or more races. Hispanic or Latino residents of any race comprised 14.9% of the population.

79.9% of residents lived in urban areas, while 20.1% lived in rural areas.

There were 79,773 households in the county, of which 24.4% had children under the age of 18 living in them. Of all households, 49.2% were married-couple households, 16.2% were households with a male householder and no spouse or partner present, and 26.6% were households with a female householder and no spouse or partner present. About 26.3% of all households were made up of individuals and 15.6% had someone living alone who was 65 years of age or older.

There were 89,165 housing units, of which 10.5% were vacant. Among occupied housing units, 79.4% were owner-occupied and 20.6% were renter-occupied. The homeowner vacancy rate was 2.4% and the rental vacancy rate was 9.4%.

=== 2000 census ===
As of the census of 2000, there were 130,802 people, 55,425 households, and 40,016 families residing in the county. The population density was 106 per square mile (41/km^{2}). There were 62,727 housing units at an average density of 51 per square mile (20/km^{2}). The racial makeup of the county was 92.85% White, 4.07% Black or African American, 0.30% Native American, 0.64% Asian, 0.02% Pacific Islander, 0.98% from other races, and 1.13% from two or more races. A total of 5.04% of the population was Hispanic or Latino of any race. 91.1% spoke only English at home, while 4.5% spoke Spanish, 1.1% German and 1.1% Italian at home.

There were 55,425 households, which 21.80% had children under the age of 18 living with them, 60.40% were married couples living together, 8.70% had a female householder with no husband present, and 27.80% were non-families. A total of 23.30% of all households were made up of individuals, and 14.70% had someone living alone who was 65 years of age or older. The average household size was 2.32 and the average family size was 2.70.

In the county 18.90% of the population was under the age of 18, 5.40% was between the ages of 18 and 24, 20.40% between 25 and 44, 24.40% between 45 and 64, and 30.90% were 65 years of age or older. The median age was 50 years. For every 100 females there were 90.50 males. For every 100 females, age 18 and over, there were 87.50 males.

The median income for a household in the county was $32,572, and the median income for a family was $37,509. Males had a median income of $30,295 versus $21,661 for females. The per capita income for the county was $18,321. About 7.10% of families and 10.30% of the population were below the poverty line, including 15.90% of those under age 18 and 6.20% of those ages 65 or over.

== Economy ==
Hernando County is home to the largest (truck-to-truck) Wal-Mart Distribution Center in the U.S. approximately 1,600,000 square feet (150,000 m^{2}) in size and located in Ridge Manor. The industrial park Airport Industrial Park is a 155-acre (0.63 km^{2}) located near the Hernando County Airport. Over one hundred aviation, manufacturing and distribution businesses are located in this area.

- Hernando County Office of Business Development

=== Top employers ===
The top employers of Hernando County are as follows:
1. Hernando County School Board (3,002)
2. Walmart (1,350)
3. Hernando County Government
4. Oak Hill Hospital (1,561)
5. Publix (1,050)
6. Walmart Hernando Distribution center (1,020)

== Transportation ==
=== Airports ===
- Brooksville–Tampa Bay Regional Airport (ICAO: KBKV, FAA LID: BKV) serves southeastern Spring Hill, northern Masaryktown, and Garden Grove.

=== Mass transit ===
Hernando THE Bus provides bus service in Brooksville and Spring Hill.

=== Railroads ===
CSX operates two rail lines within the county. Amtrak formerly provided passenger rail service along the old Seaboard Air Line Railroad line east of US 301 in Ridge Manor, but had no stops in the county, the nearest stops being Dade City on the segment that was originally part of the Atlantic Coast Line Railroad, and its last train on the line, the Palmetto had its Florida service discontinued in late 2004. The other line is the Brooksville Subdivision, which runs close to US 41, and was previously also owned by the Seaboard Air Line. The last train directly serving the county, in Croom, was local Jacksonville - St. Petersburg service in 1955 or 1956 operated by the Atlantic Coast Line Railroad.

Notable abandoned railroad lines include a former branch of the Atlantic Coast Line Railroad spanning from southeast of Ridge Manor through Istachatta that became part of the Withlacoochee State Trail, and a spur of this line from Croom west into Brooksville, which was replaced by a new rail trail called the Good Neighbor Trail. Though originally the Good Neighbor Trail only existed within Brooksville itself, the extension to the Withlacoohee State Trail has existed since 2018.

=== Major highways ===
- US 19 (SR 55 / Commercial Way) is a major commercial highway running parallel to the Gulf of Mexico on the western edge of the county, and used as a primary connecting route to cities on the west coast of Florida, including Hudson, New Port Richey, Tarpon Springs, Clearwater, and St. Petersburg, as well as Homosassa and Crystal River to the north.
- US 41 (SR 45 / Broad Street) runs parallel to US 19 through points in the center of the county, including downtown Brooksville, where it intersects with SR 50 and US 98. It is still a primary connecting route with Tampa. Between Brooksville and Garden Grove, US 41 is a six-lane highway, and between Garden Grove and Masaryktown it is a four-lane highway. To the northeast, US 41 runs through part of the Withlacoochee State Forest. Plans are currently under way to widen US 41 throughout Hernando County.
- US 98 (SR 700 / Ponce de Leon Boulevard) runs diagonally across the county from the northwest to the southeast, where it exits into Pasco County, and runs concurrent with SR 50 in the eastern part of the county, intersects I-75 in Ridge Manor West and meets the Suncoast Parkway at the parkway's current end near World Woods Golf Course north of Brooksville.
- US 301 (SR 35 / Treiman Boulevard) is a north–south highway that crosses into the county briefly at its tapered eastern end, running parallel to I-75, and intersecting with SR 50 at Ridge Manor.
- I-75 (SR 93 / Interstate 75) runs north and south across the eastern part of the county, with one exit (Exit 301) at its intersection with US 98/SR 50. Once a major connecting point with Tampa, I-75 has been made obsolete for western residents of the county by the Suncoast Parkway.
- SR 589 (Suncoast Parkway) enters the county in the south slightly to the west of US 41, and ends in the far northern part of the county at US 98. The Suncoast Parkway is a toll road that connects Hernando County with Hillsborough County, where it becomes the Veterans Expressway and heads directly into Tampa International Airport before reaching Interstate 275. SR 589 has four Hernando County exits: County Line Road (Exit 37), Spring Hill Drive (Exit 41), SR 50 (Exit 46), and US 98 (Exit 55).
- SR 50 (Cortez Boulevard) begins at US 19 in Weeki Wachee, runs through Brooksville, and exits into Sumter County at the eastern tip of the county. Along the way, it interchanges with the Suncoast Parkway, intersects with US 41 in Brooksville, runs concurrently with US 98, and intersects with I-75 in Ridge Manor West(Hernando County's only interchange with I-75) and US 301 in Ridge Manor. A significant, well-developed highway in the county, SR 50 originally extended from US 19 to the Gulf Coast at Bayport. This section was given back to the county and is currently CR 550. Currently, S.R. 50 is used as a beeline route from the county to Orlando in the east.
- SR 50A (Jefferson Street) is a spur of SR 50 that runs through downtown Brooksville, running concurrently with both US 41 and US 98 at points.
- CR 574 (Spring Hill Drive / CR 574) is a major county road running roughly parallel to both SR 50 and the border with Pasco County beginning by US 19, intersects the Suncoast Parkway, and ends at US 41.
- CR 578 (County Line Road / CR 578) is a major county road running entirely along the border with Pasco County beginning at US 19, intersects the Suncoast Parkway, and ends at US 41. Due to increased congestion, it is planned to be upgraded from two to four lanes, and possibly upgraded from a county road to a state road.

== Politics ==
Hernando County has been trending towards the Republican Party in the 21st century. As is true with multiple other Florida counties, the 2024 presidential election saw the greatest Republican support in the county since Nixon's 1972 landslide.

=== Presidential Elections ===
United States presidential election results for Hernando County, Florida
Year	Republican		Democratic		Third party(ies)	
Year	No.	%	No.	%	No.	%
1892	0	0.00%	227	73.23%	83	26.77%
1896	37	13.31%	231	83.09%	10	3.60%
1900	18	6.29%	252	88.11%	16	5.59%
1904	12	5.97%	172	85.57%	17	8.46%
1908	57	16.81%	260	76.70%	22	6.49%
1912	18	4.70%	272	71.02%	93	24.28%
1916	38	6.79%	446	79.64%	76	13.57%
1920	132	16.14%	622	76.04%	64	7.82%
1924	59	14.71%	300	74.81%	42	10.47%
1928	661	47.79%	701	50.69%	21	1.52%
1932	258	19.04%	1,097	80.96%	0	0.00%
1936	313	21.92%	1,115	78.08%	0	0.00%
1940	381	24.87%	1,151	75.13%	0	0.00%
1944	346	25.67%	1,002	74.33%	0	0.00%
1948	441	26.38%	825	49.34%	406	24.28%
1952	1,279	53.67%	1,104	46.33%	0	0.00%
1956	1,295	47.44%	1,435	52.56%	0	0.00%
1960	1,809	48.00%	1,960	52.00%	0	0.00%
1964	2,337	50.18%	2,320	49.82%	0	0.00%
1968	2,053	34.42%	1,524	25.55%	2,387	40.02%
1972	6,296	74.87%	2,110	25.09%	3	0.04%
1976	5,793	42.19%	7,717	56.20%	222	1.62%
1980	12,115	54.99%	8,858	40.21%	1,059	4.81%
1984	21,279	63.54%	12,204	36.44%	4	0.01%
1988	21,195	57.50%	15,437	41.88%	231	0.63%
1992	17,902	36.47%	19,174	39.06%	12,010	24.47%
1996	22,046	37.97%	28,524	49.12%	7,496	12.91%
2000	30,658	47.00%	32,648	50.05%	1,930	2.96%
2004	42,635	52.93%	37,187	46.17%	725	0.90%
2008	45,021	51.01%	41,886	47.46%	1,350	1.53%
2012	44,938	53.54%	37,830	45.07%	1,160	1.38%
2016	58,970	62.30%	31,795	33.59%	3,886	4.11%
2020	70,412	64.51%	37,519	34.37%	1,219	1.12%
2024	75,446	67.94%	34,431	31.00%	1,175	1.06%

=== Local Government ===
==== Board of County Commissioners ====
Hernando County's chief legislative body is the Board of County Commissioners. The county is divided into five Districts, each with their own commissioner. Commissioners are elected by the voters at large, to four-year terms. Specific duties of the county Commissioners are outlined in Chapter 125, Florida Statutes.

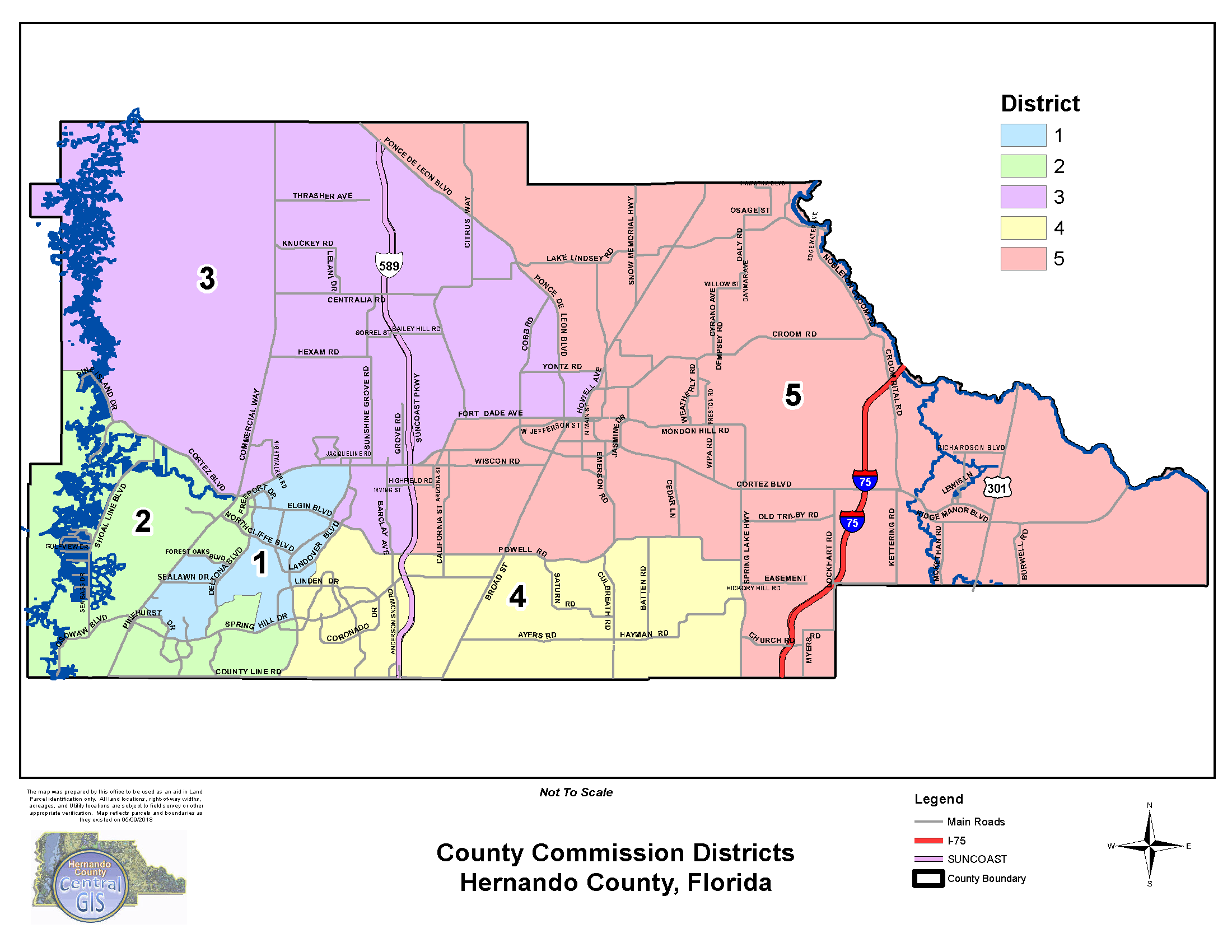
Map of the five county commission districts

===== District 1 =====
District 1 Elected Officials
Year	Commissioner	Party	Term
2018	John Mitten	REP	June 2018 - 2020
2016	Nick Nicholson	REP	2016 - June 2018
2012	Nick Nicholson	REP	2012 - 2016
2008	Jeff Stabins	REP	2008 - 2012

District 1 Elections Results

Election Year	Candidates	Party	Number of Votes	Percentage of Votes
2016	Nick Nicholson	REP	49,973	52.42%
2016	Jimmy Lodato	DEM	38,934	40.84%
2016	Total Votes		88,907	
2012	Nick Nicholson	REP	39,730	50.69%
2012	Arlene Glantz	DEM	32,716	41.73%
2012	Joseph J. Swilley Sr	INT	5,775	7.37%
2012	Write-In Votes		177	0.23%
2012	Total Votes		78,398	
2008	Jeff Stabins	REP	47,175	57.41%
2008	Ramon J Gurierrez	DEM	34,995	42.59%
2008	Total Votes		82,170	

===== District 2 =====
District 2 Elected Officials
Year	Commissioner	Party	Term
2018	Wayne Dukes	REP	2018-2022
2014	Wayne Dukes	REP	2014-2018
2010	Wayne Dukes	REP	2010-2014
2006	Rose Rocco	DEM	2006-2010
2002	Hannah M. "Nancy" Robinson	DEM	2002-2006

District 2 Elections Results

Election Year	Candidates	Party	Number of Votes	Percentage of Votes
2018	Wayne Dukes	REP	46,296	58.90%
2018	Deborah A Salvesen	DEM	32,304	41.10%
2018	Total Votes		78,600	
2014	Wayne Dukes	REP	30,673	49.40%
2014	Jimmy Lodato	DEM	26,996	43.47%
2014	Brian Moore	NPA	4,427	7.13%
2014	Total Votes		62,096	

===== District 3 =====
District 3 Elected Officials
Year	Commissioner	Party	Term
2016	John Allocco	REP	2016-2020
2012	Diane Rowden	DEM	2012-2016
2008	John Druzbick	REP	2008-2012

District 3 Elections Results

Election Year	Candidates	Party	Number of Votes	Percentage of Votes
2016	John Allocco	REP	52,667	55.25%
2016	Diane Rowden	DEM	37,177	39.00%
2016	Total Votes		89,844	
2012	Jason Patrick Sager	REP	34,899	43.86%
2012	Diane Rowden	DEM	32,716	47.26%
2012	Gregory Lewis Sheldo	NPA	6,861	8.62%
2012	Write-In Votes		201	0.25%
2012	Total Votes		79,564	
2008	John Druzbick	REP	44,270	53.55%
2008	Diane Rowden	DEM	38,404	46.45%
2008	Total Votes		82,674	

===== District 4 =====
District 4 Elected Officials
Year	Commissioner	Party	Term
2018	Jeff Holcomb	REP	2018-2022
2014	Jeff Holcomb	REP	2014-2018
2010	David Russell	REP	2010-2014
2006	David Russell	REP	2006-2010

District 4 Elections Results

Election Year	Candidates	Party	Number of Votes	Percentage of Votes
2018	Jeff Holcomb	REP	48,864	61.90%
2018	Nancy Makar	DEM	30,073	38.10%
2018	Total Votes		78,937	
2014	Jeff Holcomb	REP	33,710	54.91%
2014	Daniel T. Oliver	DEM	25,026	40.76%
2014	H. David Werder	NPA	2,656	4.33%
2014	Total Votes		61,392	

===== District 5 =====
District 5 Elected Officials
Year	Commissioner	Party	Term
2016	Steve Champion	REP	2016-2020
2012	James E Adkins	REP	2012-2016
2008	James E Adkins	REP	2008-2012

District 5 Elections Results

Election Year	Candidates	Party	Number of Votes	Percentage of Votes
2016	Steve Champion	REP	55,892	58.63%
2016	Paul Douglas	DEM	32,362	33.95%
2016	Total Votes		88,254	
2012	James E Adkins	REP	44,091	56.56%
2012	Ramon J Gutierrez	DEM	33,859	43.44%
2012	Total Votes		77,950	
2008	James E. Adkins	REP	41,796	50.81%
2008	Christopher Kingsley	DEM	40,471	49.19%
2008	Total Votes		82,267	

==== Constitutional Officers ====
===== Clerk of Court and Comptroller =====
Year	Officer	Party	Term
2020	Doug Chorvat	REP	2020-2022
2018	Doug Chorvat	REP	2018-2020
2016	Donald C. Barbee, Jr.	REP	2016-2018

===== Supervisor Of Elections =====
Year	Officer	Party	Term
2020	Shirley Anderson	REP	2020-2024
2016	Shirley Anderson	REP	2016-2020
2012	Shirley Anderson	REP	2012-2016
2008	Annie D Williams	DEM	2008-2012

===== Property Appraiser =====
Year	Officer	Party	Term
2016	John Emerson	REP	2016-2020
2012	John Emerson	REP	2012-2016

===== Sheriff =====
Year	Officer	Party	Term
2020	Alvin "Al" Nienhuis	REP	2020-2024
2016	Alvin "Al" Nienhuis	REP	2016-2020
2012	Alvin "Al" Nienhuis	REP	2012-2016
2010	Alvin "Al" Nienhuis	REP	2010-2012
2008	Richard B Nugent	REP	2008-2010

== Emergency Management ==
=== Fire Departments ===
- Brooksville Fire Department
- Hernando County Fire Rescue

=== Law Enforcement Agencies ===
- Hernando County Sheriff's Office
- Florida Department of Law Enforcement
- FWC Division of Law Enforcement (State Game Wardens)
- Florida Highway Patrol

=== Hospitals ===
- Tampa General Hospital Brooksville (formerly, Brooksville Regional Hospital)
- Encompass Health Rehabilitation Hospital of Spring Hill (formerly, HealthSouth)
- HCA Florida Oak Hill Hospital (formerly, Oak Hill Hospital)
- Tampa General Hospital Spring Hill (formerly, Spring Hill Regional Hospital)
- Springbrook Behavioral Hospital

== Library ==
The county is served by the Hernando County Library System. This is a public library system with one central library located in Brooksville and three other branches in Brooksville and Spring Hill. There are no bookmobiles associated with this library system. As of 2013, the staff totaled 42 people, including 11 librarians and 31 other staff members, only ten of which were full-time employees. The Florida Library Association chose the Hernando system as its 2013 Library of the Year. This library system serves a legal population of 136,484 people. The annual number of library visits is 480,706. There are 49 Internet terminals for use by the general public. The annual service hours for all service outlets is 12,215.

The library system has four branches:

- Main Library/Brooksville Branch
- East Hernando Branch
- West Hernando Branch
- Spring Hill Branch

== Communities ==
=== Cities ===
- Brooksville

=== Census-designated places ===
- Aripeka
- Bayport
- Brookridge
- Garden Grove
- Hernando Beach
- High Point
- Hill 'n Dale
- Istachatta
- Lake Lindsey
- Masaryktown
- Nobleton
- North Brooksville
- North Weeki Wachee
- Pine Island
- Ridge Manor
- South Brooksville
- Spring Hill
- Spring Lake
- Timber Pines
- Weeki Wachee Gardens
- Wiscon

=== Other unincorporated communities ===
- Croom
- Rolling Acres
- Royal Highlands
- Weeki Wachee

== See also ==
- National Register of Historic Places listings in Hernando County, Florida
