= Hernando County Public Library System =

Library system in Florida, United States

Coordinates: 28.5570°N 82.3874°W

- Location: Brooksville, FL, USA
- Established: 1950
- Branches: 4

Other information
- Website: https://hernandocountylibrary.us/

The Hernando County Public Library System has 4 branches located in Hernando County, Florida, which is located on the west central coast of the state. The library system serves approximately 196,540 residents as of 2022. The main branch is located in downtown Brooksville and was dedicated as the Frederick Eugene Lykes Jr. Memorial Library in 1950. There are additional branches in East Brooksville, West Brooksville, and Spring Hill. The Florida Library Association chose the Hernando system as its 2013 Library of the Year. While Hernando County established one of the first bookmobiles in the state, it is no longer operational. As of 2020, the staff totaled 32 people, including 7 librarians and 25 other staff members. The library had about 92,940 cardholders and had 454,112 circulation transactions in 2020. The library is a member of the Tampa Bay Library Consortium.

== Library Collection ==
As of 2020, the library collection included 134,274 physical items and 46,910 digital items. The library’s collection is fully funded under the provisions of the State Aid to Libraries Grant program, administered by the Florida Department of State’s Division of Library and Information Services.

== Library History ==
In 1910, the Brooksville Woman’s Club created Hernando County's first free lending library. Within 7 years they collected about 1,083 texts valued at about $833. By 1926, the collection included 1500 items. The Woman's Club attempted to donate the items to the City of Brooksville in order to start a public library funded by the city. However, the city rejected the offer due to a lack of finances, and the Woman's Club maintained responsibility for the library. In the 1930s President Roosevelt awarded the State Library of Florida $137,278 via the Work Progress Administration, a portion of which was allocated to Hernando County and used to fund library services including the bookmobile. Books were transported weekly to rural communities and schools.

In 1949 the county purchased property in the city of Brooksville to establish a permanent facility – which still operates as the main branch of the library. The library was dedicated as the Frederick Eugene Lykes Jr. Memorial Library in 1950, in honor of the deceased son of Frederick Eugene Lykes Sr. who provided much of the funding for the library and was heavily involved with its operations. This library is built within a 1.5-acre public park known as Hernando Park in downtown Brooksville. This library has been renovated and expanded to keep up with current demands. By 1977 the county had 11,690 card holders and a collection of over 47,000 books. The library system ran on 4 full-time and 1 part-time worker and many volunteers.

In 1965 a library branch opened in Ridge Manor on the east side of the county, and a branch in Spring Hill followed in 1968.

In response to a population boom in the 1980s, the West Hernando branch of the library was built and dedicated in 1985. In 1993 the branch was renamed the Staffordene T. Foggia Memorial Library. Staffordene Foggia founded the Friends of the Library of Hernando County in 1983 and was the first president of the organization.

In 1993 the library system was awarded a $400,000 federal grant for the construction of a new library in Spring Hill. It was intended to be established as the headquarters and be named after Harold G. Zopp, a prominent land developer with the Deltona Corporation. However, the money was returned and plans were put on hold after a contentious county commission meeting in 1994. John Callahan III, the system's director, departed shortly after the loss. A council was established to discuss other options for creating the library, which would not officially open for 12 more years. By the time of the branch's opening, the original plans for the library were largely forgotten and the commission was planning to name the library in honor of Frank W. Bierwiler Jr. before the original plans to name the library were rediscovered. Instead, the emergency services building was named after Bierwiler, and the Harold G. Zopp Memorial Library opened in 2006. The previous building, known as the Little Red Schoolhouse, was left to the Friends of the Library.

Earlier in 2006, the East Hernando Library in Ridge Manor, FL relocated from a storefront in the Sunrise Plaza shopping center to a new 8,500-square-foot building.

== Controversy ==
In 1953 the library received complaints about Communist materials in the library and the board appointed retired colonel and library board member Paul B. Parker to remove materials from the library that were deemed "un-American." The FBI was given a list of the materials. The materials were suspected to include: Mission to Moscow by Joseph E. Davies, The Soviet by Albert R. Williams, Russia and Japan by Maurice Hindus, People of the USSR by Anna Louise Strong, and various magazines and pamphlets such as The Nation and New World Review. Many of the materials were brought in by Lisa von Borowsky, a member of the library board who shared materials belonging to her benefactor colonel Raymond Robins. Robins was the husband of Margaret Dreier Robins, founder of the YWCA and leader of the Brooksville Woman's Club during the founding of the first lending library in Hernando County. Many of the materials were eventually returned to the library, and most of the participants in the incident declined to speak on the subject. However, some did report suspicious incidents that they suspected were related to the investigation.

== Branches ==
The Hernando County Public Library System consists of four branches: The branches are organized by location and the main branch is located in downtown Brooksville, Florida.

=== Frederick Eugene Lykes Jr. Memorial Library (Main Branch) ===
Frederick Eugene Lykes Jr. Memorial Library (Main Branch)

General information
- Location: Brooksville, Florida, 238 Howell Avenue Brooksville, FL 34601
- Opened: 1910

Website
- https://hernandocountylibrary.us/main-branch-location/

Main Branch: Frederick Eugene Lykes Jr. Memorial Library (Brooksville): 238 Howell Avenue Brooksville, FL 34601 Hours: Mon-Wed- 10:00 AM-6:00 PM, Thurs- 12:00 PM-8:00 PM, Fri- 9:00 AM-5:00 PM, Sat & Sun- CLOSED

=== East Hernando Branch ===
East Hernando Branch: 6457 Windmere Road Brooksville, FL 34602 Hours: Tues & Wed- 10:00 AM-6:00 PM, Thurs- 12:00 PM-8:00 PM, Fri & Sat- 9:00 AM-5:00 PM, Sun & Mon- CLOSED

=== Staffordene T. Foggia Memorial Library (West Hernando Branch) ===
West Hernando Branch: Staffordene T. Foggia Memorial Library: 6335 Blackbird Avenue Brooksville, FL 34613 Hours: Mon-Wed- 10:00 AM-6:00 PM, Thurs- 12:00 PM-8:00 PM, Fri- 9:00 AM-5:00 PM, Sat & Sun- CLOSED

=== Harold G. Zopp Memorial Library (Spring Hill Branch) ===
Spring Hill Branch: Harold G. Zopp Memorial Library: 9220 Spring Hill Drive Spring Hill, FL 34608 Hours: Tues & Wed- 10:00 AM-6:00 PM, Thurs- 12:00 PM-8:00 PM, Fri & Sat- 9:00 AM-5:00 PM, Sun & Mon- CLOSED

Istachatta Library Station: 16246 Lingle Road Brooksville, FL 34601 (Closed in September 2016 due to the property being declared surplus)

== Services ==
Services include storytimes, book discussions, computer classes, art classes, coding classes, sewing classes and other in-person events. Digital resources include language learning, genealogy, craft and arts classes, and job skills training.

== Funding & Operating Revenue ==
2020 Revenue	Amount
Local Government Revenue	2,511,721
Florida Government Revenue	644,621
Federal Government Revenue	0
Other Revenue	31,691
Total Income	3,118,033

== Library Damages ==
On July 6, 2013, a fire broke out at the East Hernando Library location. The fire was deemed suspicious due to the fact that some of the wicker furniture from inside the library had been piled up against the back porch door. Two weeks later the Hernando County Sheriff's Office and the Florida Division of State Fire Marshal received a confession from a suspect who had been previously reported to be on the scene at the time of the fire. The suspect has since been reported as 18 year old Joseph Brannen. The suspect had made his presence known at the scene of the fire by claiming he was going to school to become a volunteer fire fighter and was there to assist with putting out the fire – he also arrived in a fire suit and an oxygen tank strapped to his back. The smoke and water damage from this incident has been estimated at $500,000. This estimation includes $250,000 in damages to the building and another $250,000 to the books. Eighteen thousand books were damaged by either smoke or water during the incident. The suspect accepted a plea deal with the following terms: 8 years in prison, pay back roughly $590,000 to Travelers Insurance and $25,000 to Hernando County.

== Awards ==
- Florida Library of the Year Award for 2013
