= Bayport Park =

Country park in Bayport, Florida

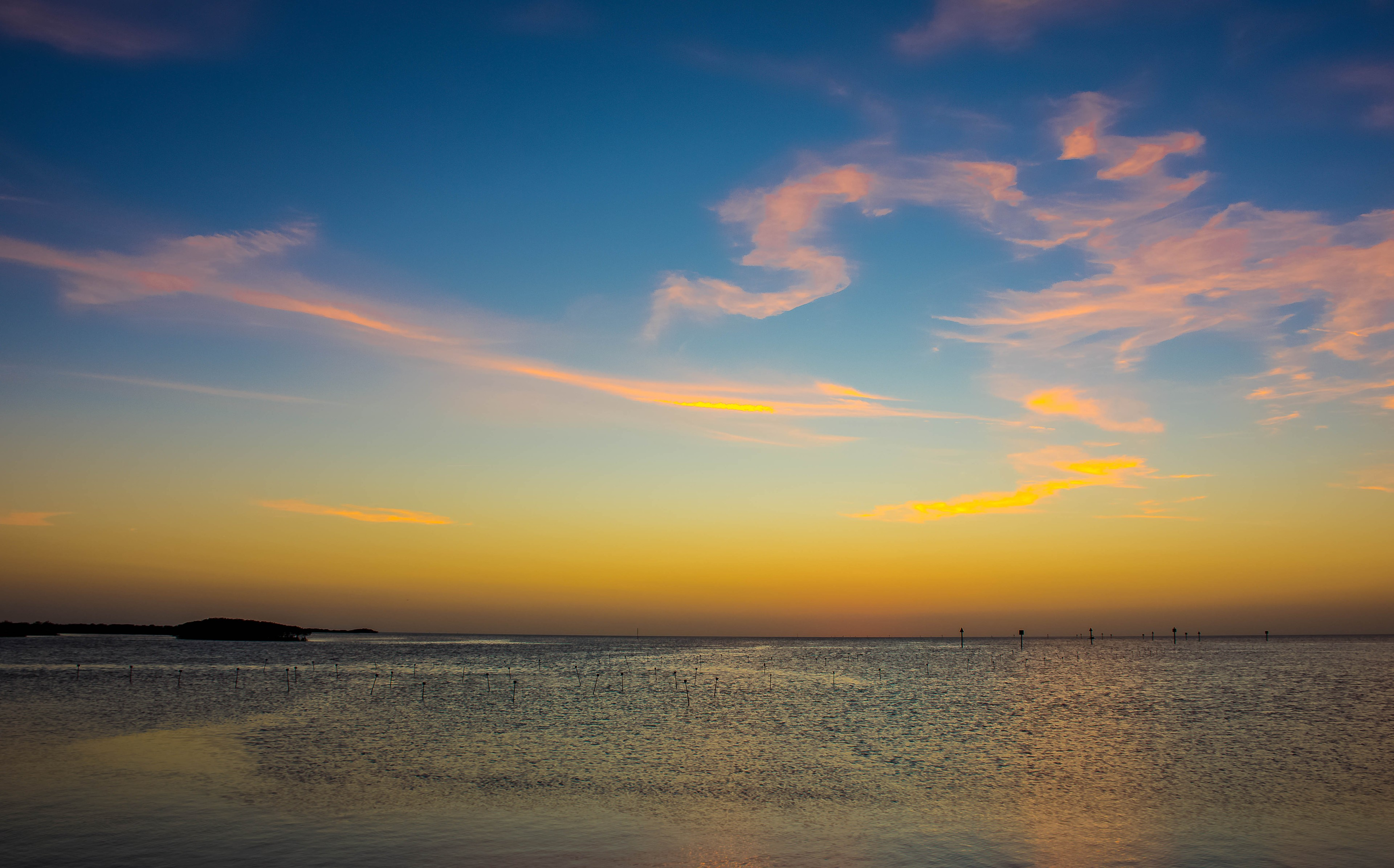
- The Gulf of Mexico, shortly after sunset at Bayport Park, March 2018
- Interactive map of Bayport Park
- Type: County park
- Location: Hernando County, Florida
- Nearest city: Bayport, Florida
- Coordinates: 28.537°N 82.650°W
- Area: 7 acres (2.8 ha)
- Operator: Hernando County Parks and Recreation
- Status: Open

Bayport Park is a county park in Hernando County, Florida, specifically in Bayport, Florida. It sits on 7 acres adjacent to the Gulf of Mexico, directly at the end of Florida State Road 50. It contains a boardwalk, picnic pavilions, a fishing pier, and twin boat ramps.
