= High Point, Hernando County, Florida =

- Census-designated place
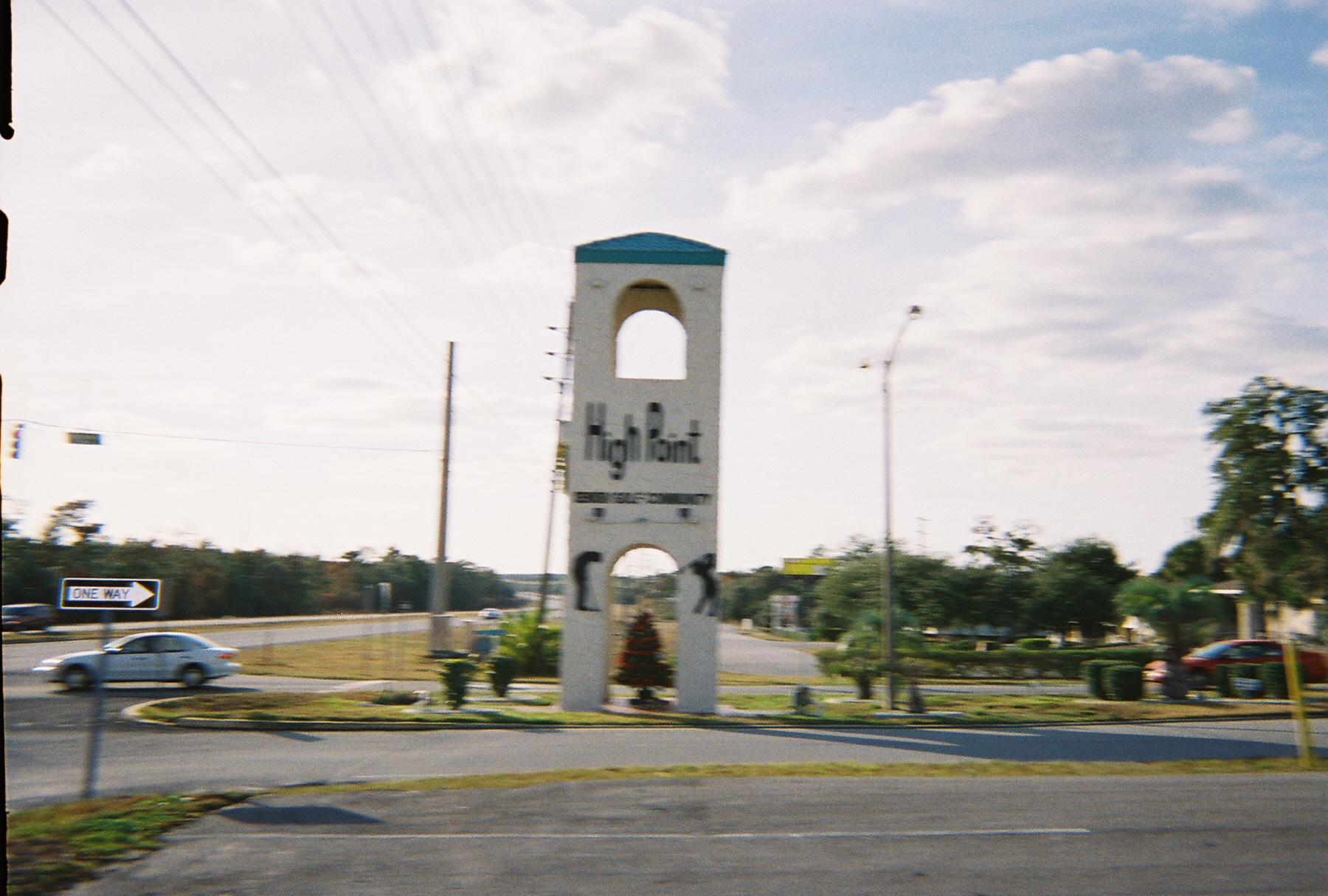
- Gateway to High Point, off State Road 50

- Location in Hernando County and the state of Florida
- Coordinates: 28°32′34″N 82°30′26″W
- Country: United States
- State: Florida
- Counties: Hernando

Area
  - Total: 4.98 sq mi (12.90 km^{2})
  - Land: 4.96 sq mi (12.85 km^{2})
  - Water: 0.019 sq mi (0.05 km^{2})
- Elevation: 66 ft (20 m)

Population (2020)
  - Total: 3,873
  - Density: 781/sq mi (301.4/km^{2})
- Time zone: UTC-5 (Eastern (EST))
  - Summer (DST): UTC-4 (EDT)
- FIPS code: 12-30494
- GNIS feature ID: 2402582

High Point is an unincorporated area and census-designated place (CDP) in Hernando County, Florida, United States. The population was 3,686 at the 2010 census.

== Geography ==
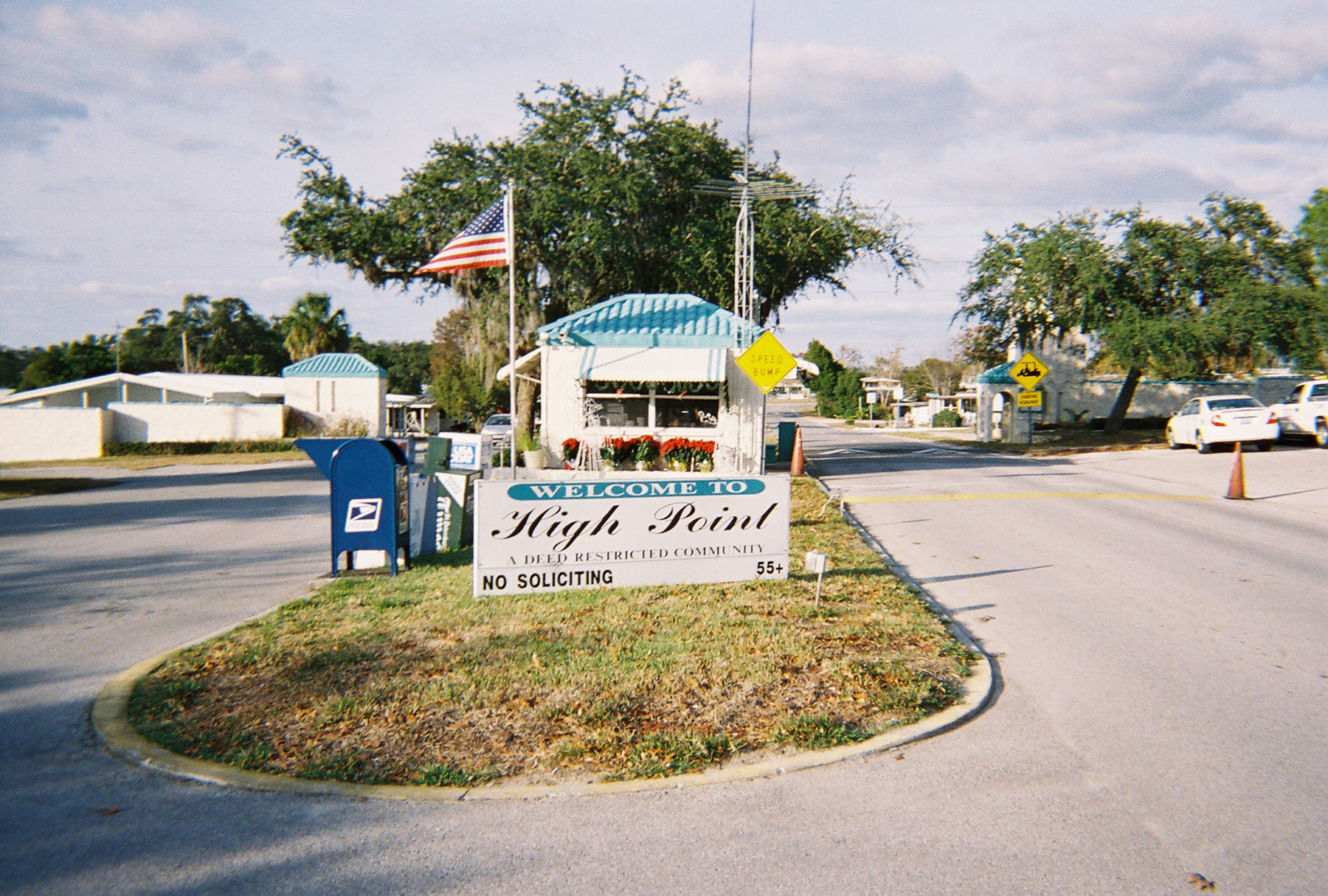
Guarded gate to High Point

High Point is in west-central Hernando County. It is bordered to the north and west by North Weeki Wachee, to the east by Brookridge, and to the south, across State Road 50, by Spring Hill. SR 50 leads east 8 miles (13 km) to Brooksville, the Hernando County seat, and west 4 miles (6 km) to its terminus at U.S. Route 19 in Weeki Wachee.

According to the United States Census Bureau, the High Point CDP has a total area of 5.0 square miles (12.9 km^{2}), of which 0.02 square miles (0.05 km^{2}), or 0.40%, are water.

== Demographics ==
Historical population
Census	Pop.	Note	%±
2020	3,873		—
U.S. Decennial Census

As of the census of 2000, there were 2,973 people, 1,514 households, and 944 families residing in the CDP. The population density was 1,011.4 inhabitants per square mile (390.5/km^{2}). There were 1,843 housing units at an average density of 627.0 per square mile (242.1/km^{2}). The racial makeup of the CDP was 98.45% White, 0.13% African American, 0.10% Native American, 0.30% Asian, 0.54% from other races, and 0.47% from two or more races. Hispanic or Latino of any race were 2.25% of the population.

There were 1,514 households, out of which 10.3% had children under the age of 18 living with them, 54.1% were married couples living together, 6.3% had a female householder with no husband present, and 37.6% were non-families. 34.5% of all households were made up of individuals, and 27.5% had someone living alone who was 65 years of age or older. The average household size was 1.96 and the average family size was 2.44.

In the CDP, the population was spread out, with 10.9% under the age of 18, 2.9% from 18 to 24, 12.4% from 25 to 44, 20.3% from 45 to 64, and 53.5% who were 65 years of age or older. The median age was 67 years. For every 100 females, there were 81.9 males. For every 100 females age 18 and over, there were 81.0 males.

The median income for a household in the CDP was $25,434, and the median income for a family was $30,865. Males had a median income of $27,955 versus $23,588 for females. The per capita income for the CDP was $19,051. About 4.0% of families and 7.4% of the population were below the poverty line, including 16.1% of those under age 18 and 7.6% of those age 65 or over.
