= Brookridge, Florida =

- Census-designated place
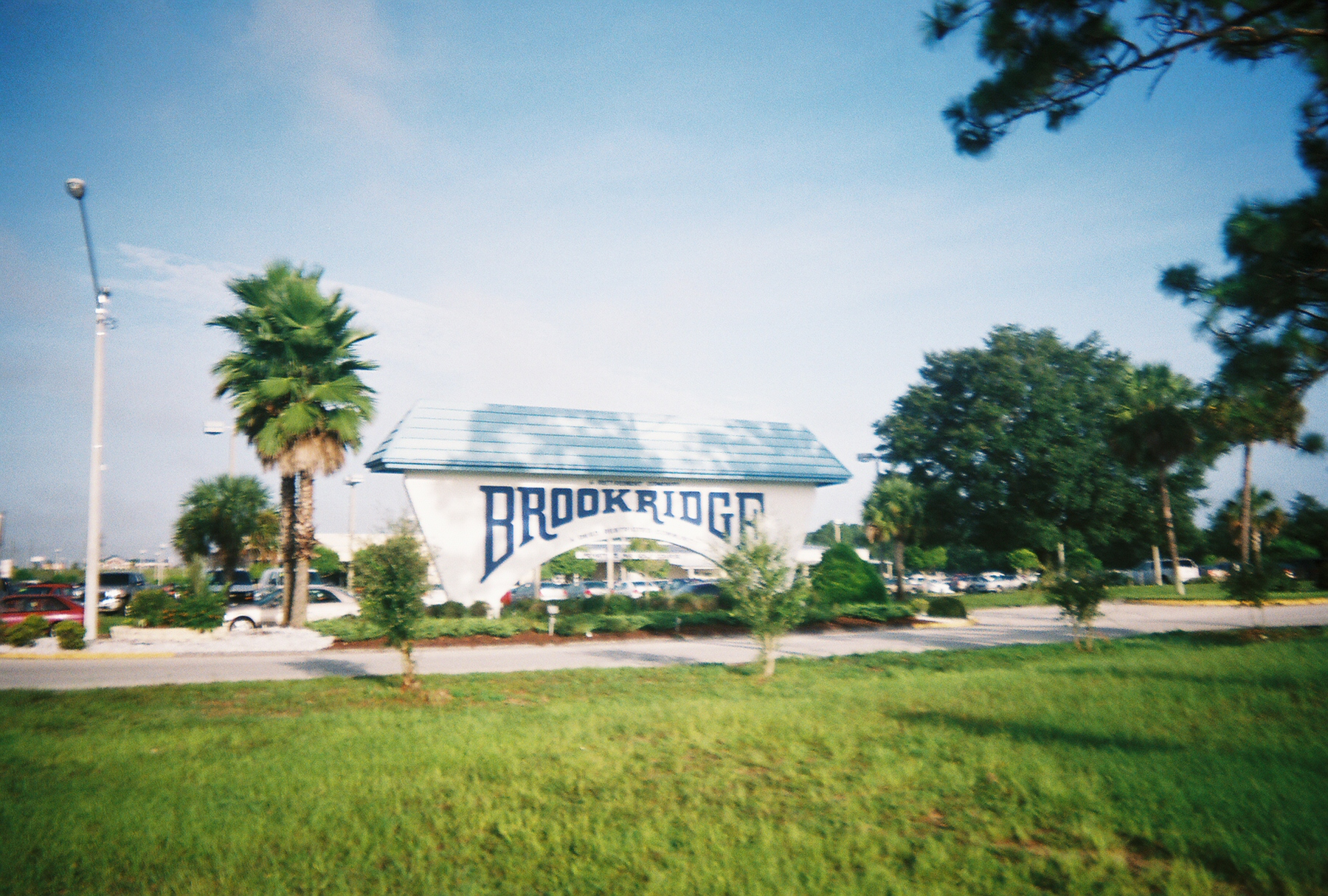
- The gateway to Brookridge on State Road 50

- Location in Hernando County and the state of Florida
- Coordinates: 28°33′12″N 82°29′48″W
- Country: United States
- State: Florida
- County: Hernando

Area
  - Total: 2.53 sq mi (6.56 km^{2})
  - Land: 2.53 sq mi (6.56 km^{2})
  - Water: 0 sq mi (0.00 km^{2})
- Elevation: 69 ft (21 m)

Population (2020)
  - Total: 4,658
  - Density: 1,839.0/sq mi (710.04/km^{2})
- Time zone: UTC-5 (Eastern (EST))
  - Summer (DST): UTC-4 (EDT)
- ZIP code: 34613
- Area code: 352
- FIPS code: 12-08762
- GNIS feature ID: 2402720

Brookridge is a census-designated place (CDP) in Hernando County, Florida, United States. As of the 2020 census, Brookridge had a population of 4,658.

== Geography ==
Brookridge is located in central Hernando County. It is bordered to the east by Florida State Road 589 (the Suncoast Parkway), to the south across Florida State Road 50 by Spring Hill, and to the west by High Point. SR 589 leads south 50 miles (80 km) to Tampa and north 10 miles (16 km) to its terminus at U.S. Route 98 near Sugarmill Woods. SR 50 leads east 6 miles (10 km) to Brooksville, the Hernando County seat, and west 5 miles (8 km) to U.S. Route 19 at Weeki Wachee.

According to the United States Census Bureau, the Brookridge CDP has a total area of 2.5 square miles (6.5 km^{2}), all land.

== Demographics ==
Historical population
| Census | Pop. | Note | %± |
|---|---|---|---|
| 2020 | 4,658 | | — |
U.S. Decennial Census

=== 2020 census ===
As of the 2020 census, Brookridge had a population of 4,658. The median age was 67.3 years. 9.8% of residents were under the age of 18 and 55.2% of residents were 65 years of age or older. For every 100 females there were 81.0 males, and for every 100 females age 18 and over there were 77.8 males age 18 and over.

100.0% of residents lived in urban areas, while 0.0% lived in rural areas.

There were 2,445 households in Brookridge, of which 10.0% had children under the age of 18 living in them. Of all households, 44.6% were married-couple households, 15.5% were households with a male householder and no spouse or partner present, and 34.6% were households with a female householder and no spouse or partner present. About 37.8% of all households were made up of individuals and 28.5% had someone living alone who was 65 years of age or older.

There were 2,942 housing units, of which 16.9% were vacant. The homeowner vacancy rate was 3.8% and the rental vacancy rate was 12.1%.

Racial composition as of the 2020 census
| Race | Number | Percent |
|---|---|---|
| White | 4,131 | 88.7% |
| Black or African American | 124 | 2.7% |
| American Indian and Alaska Native | 11 | 0.2% |
| Asian | 34 | 0.7% |
| Native Hawaiian and Other Pacific Islander | 1 | 0.0% |
| Some other race | 60 | 1.3% |
| Two or more races | 297 | 6.4% |
| Hispanic or Latino (of any race) | 391 | 8.4% |

=== 2000 census ===
As of the census of 2000, there were 3,279 people, 1,823 households, and 1,168 families residing in the CDP. The population density was 1,617.7 inhabitants per square mile (624.6/km^{2}). There were 2,129 housing units at an average density of 1,050.4 per square mile (405.6/km^{2}). The racial makeup of the CDP was 98.87% White, 0.15% African American, 0.09% Native American, 0.18% Asian, 0.21% from other races, and 0.49% from two or more races. Hispanic or Latino of any race were 0.95% of the population.

There were 1,823 households, out of which 2.5% had children under the age of 18 living with them, 59.0% were married couples living together, 4.0% had a female householder with no husband present, and 35.9% were non-families. 33.5% of all households were made up of individuals, and 29.0% had someone living alone who was 65 years of age or older. The average household size was 1.76 and the average family size was 2.14.

In the CDP, the population was spread out, with 2.9% under the age of 18, 1.3% from 18 to 24, 5.4% from 25 to 44, 19.0% from 45 to 64, and 71.4% who were 65 years of age or older. The median age was 72 years. For every 100 females, there were 82.0 males. For every 100 females age 18 and over, there were 81.4 males.

The median income for a household in the CDP was $24,774, and the median income for a family was $30,139. The per capita income for the CDP was $18,122. About 4.2% of families and 5.7% of the population were below the poverty line, including none of those under age 18 and 5.7% of those age 65 or over.
