= Tampa General Hospital =

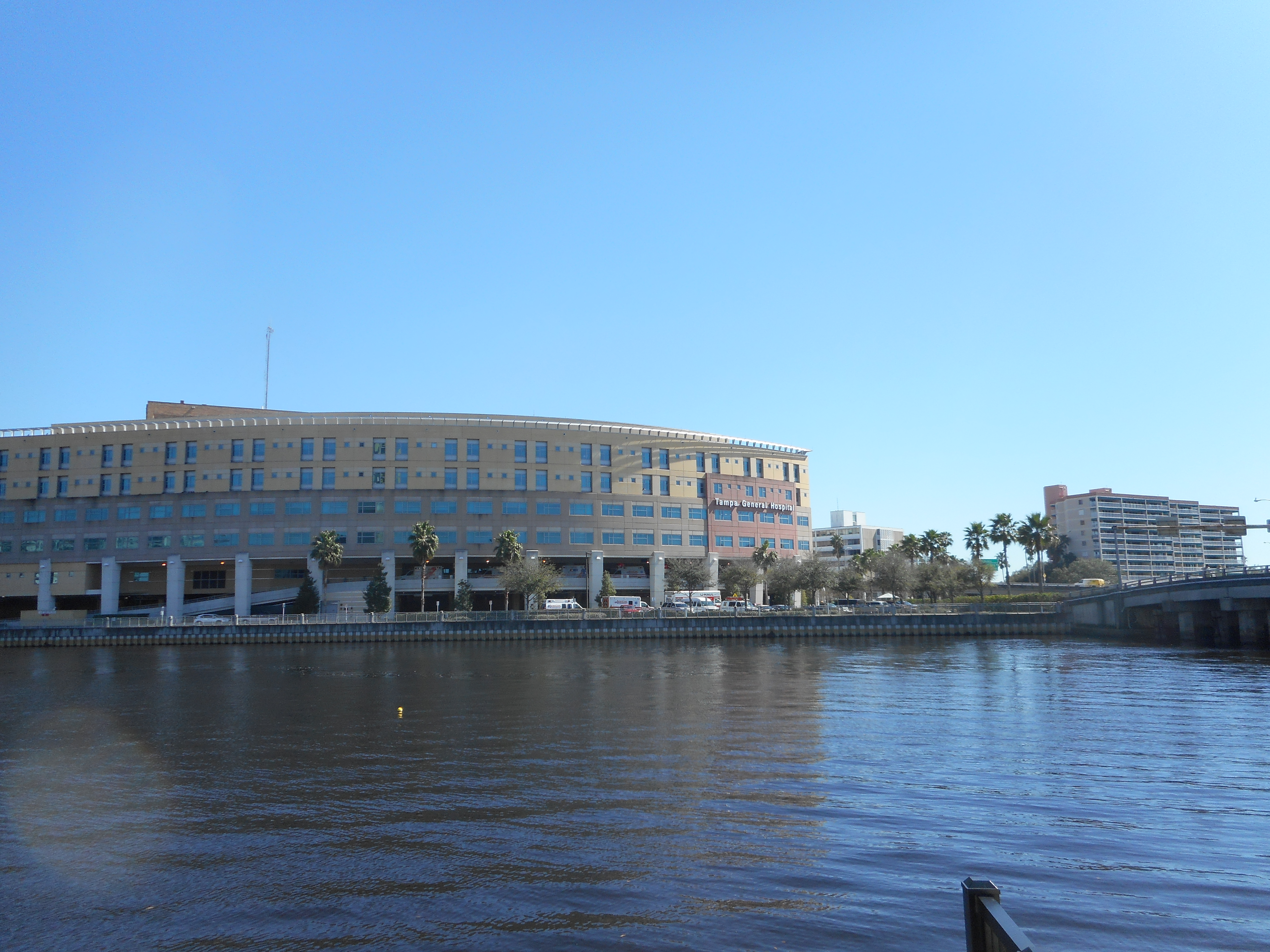
- Tampa General Hospital as seen from Bayshore Boulevard in South Tampa, Florida.

Geography
- Location: 1 Tampa General Circle, Tampa, Florida, United States
- Coordinates: 27.9383°N 82.4587°W

Organization
- Care system: Private hospital
- Type: Teaching hospital/General hospital
- Affiliated university: USF Morsani College of Medicine

Services
- Emergency department: Level I Adult Trauma Center / Level I Pediatric Trauma Center
- Beds: 1,040

Helipads
- Helipad: FAA LID: 61FL

History
- Former name: Tampa Municipal Hospital
- Founded: 1927

Links
- Website: www.tgh.org
- Lists: Hospitals in Florida

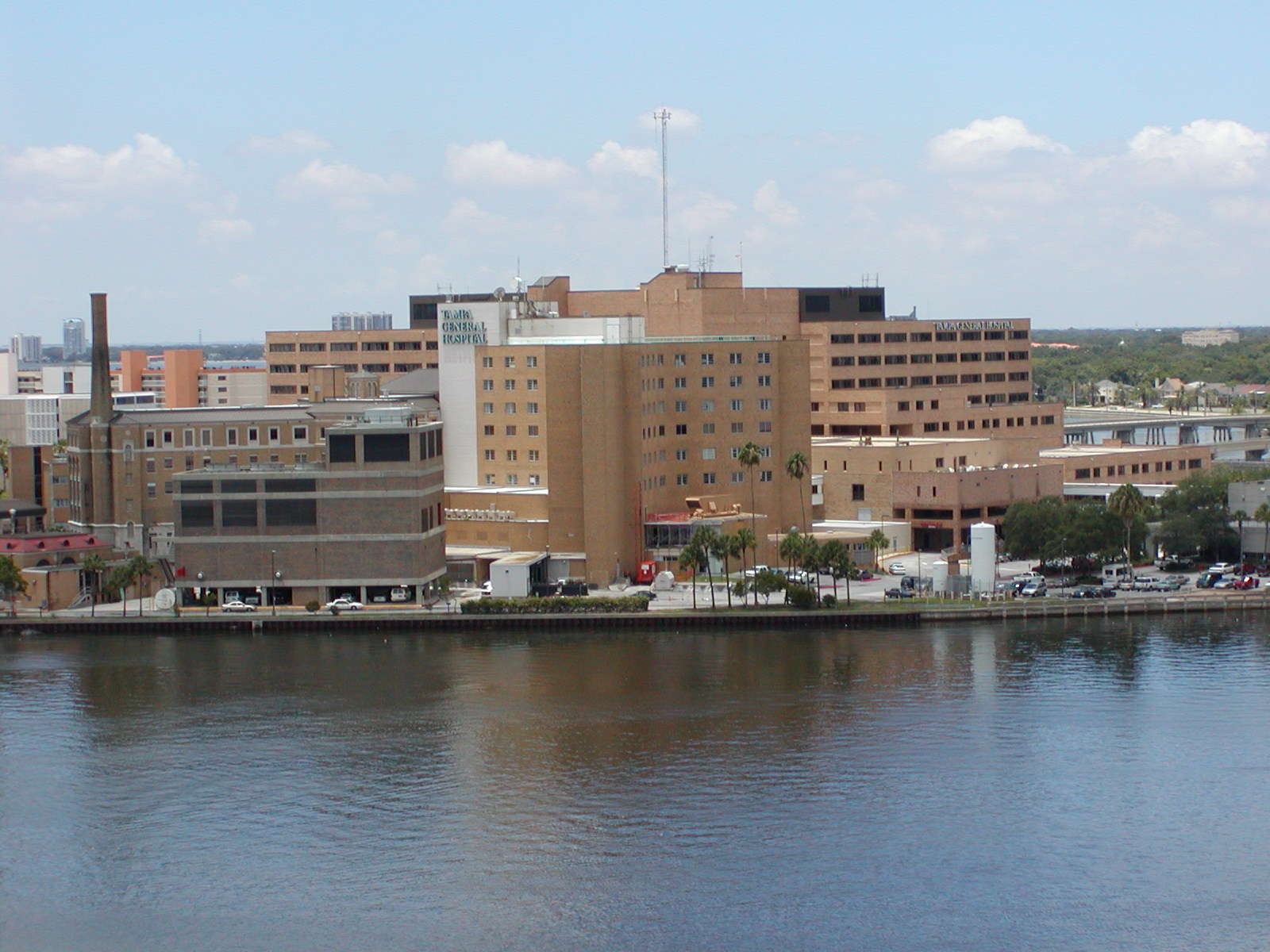
2002 image of Tampa General Hospital. A portion of the original hospital building can be seen on the left (with visible smokestack).

Tampa General Hospital (TGH) is a 1,040-bed non-profit hospital, tertiary, research and academic medical center located on Davis Island in Tampa, Florida, servicing western Florida and the greater Tampa Bay region. TGH is one of the region's only university-level academic medical centers. Tampa General Hospital is the primary teaching affiliate of the Morsani College of Medicine of University of South Florida. TGH also features the area's only ACS designated level I adult and pediatric trauma center and has a rooftop helipad to handle medevac patients. Attached to the medical center is the Tampa General Hospital Children's Medical Center that treats infants, children, adolescents, and young adults up to the age of 21.

Tampa General Hospital has more than 8,000 team members and is one of six burn centers in Florida.

== History ==
Local legend has it that the placement of what was originally named Tampa Municipal Hospital on Davis Islands was decided in a bunker of the Palma Ceia Country Club golf course. David P. Davis, the developer of Davis Islands, was playing with Dr. J. Brown Farrior, James Swann, and Mayor Chancy of Tampa. The city had considered expanding the existing George Keller Memorial Hospital, located at 306 North Boulevard in what had been the grounds of the Tampa Bay Hotel, but had found such expansion unworkable. Instead, it approached Davis about building upon the Davis Islands land that he had deeded to the city. On the golf course, Davis asked Farrior, who was then chairman of the city's Committee for the Construction of Tampa Municipal Hospital, where he wanted the hospital sited, drawing a rough map of the Islands in the sand. Farrior indicated the tip of the island.

This site is where the hospital construction began in March 1926, voters in the city having approved a USD215,000 bond issue to fund construction in 1924. The hospital building was complete by the next year, the final construction cost having been US$300,000, with patients moving to there from the George Keller Memorial Hospital on 1927-11-15. James Swann became the Chairman of the board of directors of Tampa Municipal.

The original hospital building, the inscription over whose main entrance archway reads "Tampa Municipal Hospital Memorial to Gordon Keller", was originally surrounded by parkland, and dominated the landscape of Davis Islands. It provided 250 hospital beds for patients. Whilst it still stands today, it has become almost wholly obscured from view by new buildings, and additions to the hospital, that surround it. In 1936, the Gordon Keller School expanded into a new building next to the original.

In 1956, the hospital was renamed to Tampa General Hospital. In 1991, the original building was renamed after Clara Frye, an African American nurse who ran the Clara Frye Hospital for 20 years in the early 1900s, and after whom the Clara Frye Memorial Hospital that existed in West Tampa from 1938 to 1967 had been named. Frye admitted patients of all races, African American or otherwise, to her hospital. The Tampa Municipal Hospital did not admit African American patients until the 1950s.

== About ==
TGH has specialty centers for Orthopedics, Trauma, Obesity, Neurology, Thyroid and Parathyroid Surgery, Head and Neck Surgery, Burns, Cardiac Surgery, Transplantation, Vascular Surgery, Women's Health and OB/GYN, Pediatrics, Neonatal Intensive Care, In-vitro Fertilization, and others. Tampa General Hospital is home to one of the leading organ transplant centers in the country, having performed more than 9,000 adult solid organ transplants, including the state's first successful heart transplant in 1985.

Tampa General Hospital is a level one trauma center, with a five-helicopter fleet, serving 23 counties.

=== Awards ===
The hospital ranked 118th nationally on the 2019 Newsweek: Best US Hospitals.

As of 2021 Tampa General Hospital has placed nationally in 5 ranked pediatric specialties on U.S. News & World Report.

U.S. News & World Report Rankings for Tampa General Hospital
| Specialty | Rank (In the U.S.) | Score (Out of 100) |
|---|---|---|
| Cancer | High Performing | 49.6 |
| Cardiology and Heart Surgery | #50 | 54.1 |
| Diabetes & Endocrinology | #36 | 56.6 |
| Gastroenterology & GI Surgery | #24 | 70.2 |
| Geriatrics | High Performing | 70.1 |
| Nephrology | #44 | 55.9 |
| Neurology and Neurosurgery | High Performing | 59.6 |
| Orthopedics | #19 | 57.8 |
| Pulmonology and Lung Surgery | High Performing | 64.5 |
| Urology | High Performing | 59.8 |

=== Emergency preparedness ===
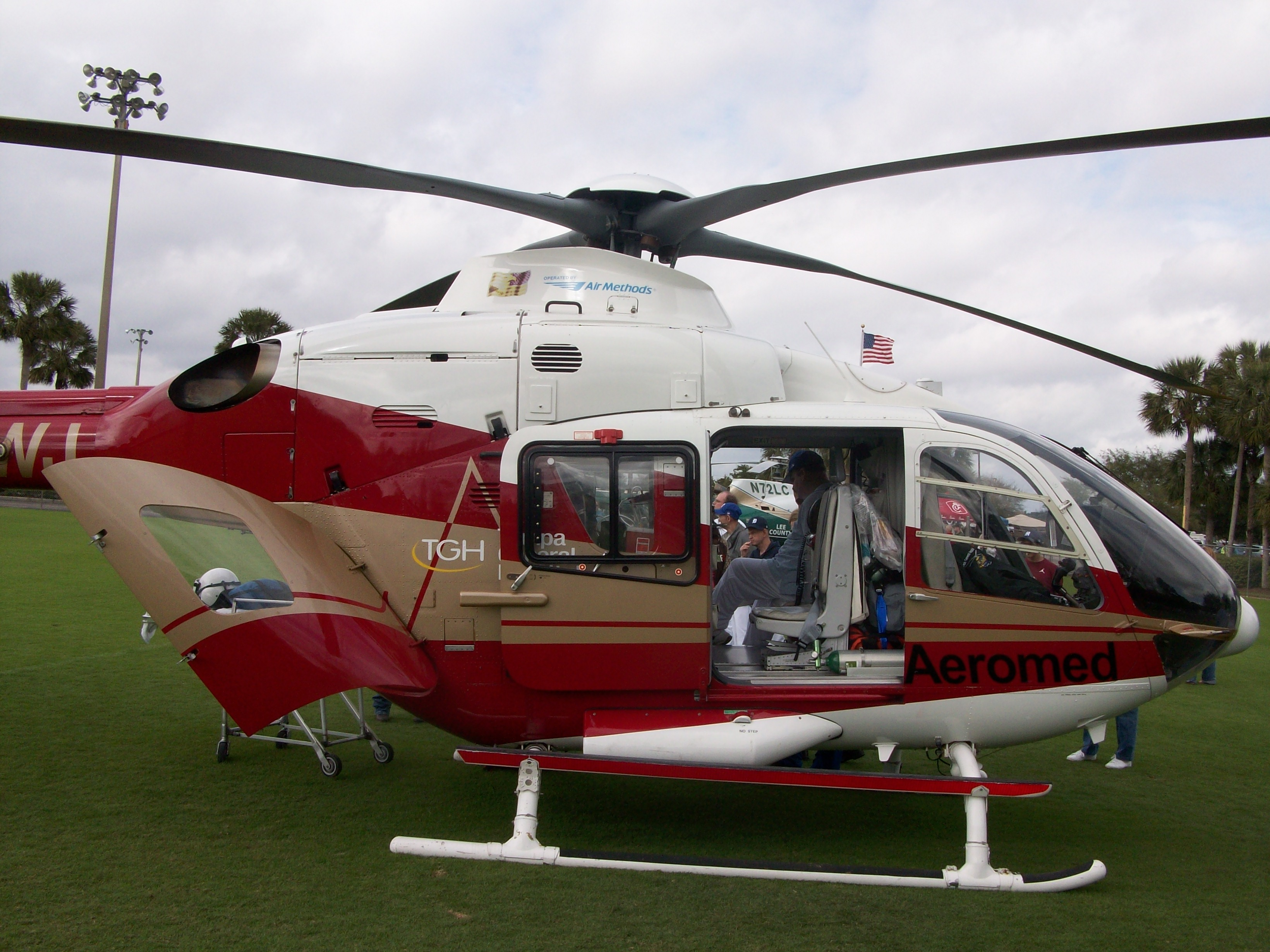
One of the Aeromed helicopters operated by TGH

Rodney Kite-Powell, the curator of the Tampa Bay History Center, opines that neither the voters of 1924 nor the city's hospital construction committee gave much thought to the location of the hospital, with their primary motivation apparently being merely that the city already owned the land. The location of the hospital has proven to be inconvenient over the years, as Davis Islands were originally accessible from elsewhere via just one bridge (now two).

The impact of Hurricane Elena caused the hospital's main generator plant to be moved out of its previous location in the basement to a higher location, reducing the risk of it being rendered in-operational by flooding, but the hospital site is still vulnerable to the Davis Islands bridges being washed out during a hurricane.

The hospital itself is now largely proofed against storms, despite the continuing vulnerability of the island it sits upon. Recent building work in the 21st century, on the Bayshore Pavilion, has incorporated many of the hospital design recommendations of Washington Hospital Center's ER One project. All critical functions have been placed at or above the second level of the building, above the storm surge level, placing emergency room parking on the first level.

The hospital employs an AquaFence when a hurricane is forecast; erecting the fence requires 60 workers for three days. The fence the hospital uses can withstand storm surges of 15 feet (4.6 m) and wind speeds of 130 miles (210 km) per hour, which can handle a category 3 hurricane. The hospital used the fence for the first time during 2022's category 5 Hurricane Ian. During 2023's category 4 Hurricane Idalia the fence allowed about two feet of water through. It was deployed during 2024's category 3 Hurricane Helene.

== See also ==
- TGH Brooksville
- TGH Crystal River
- TGH Spring Hill
- BayCare Health System
- Morsani College of Medicine
- University of South Florida
- List of children's hospitals in the United States
