= Spring Hill, Florida =

Census-designated place in Hernando County Florida, United States

- Census-designated place
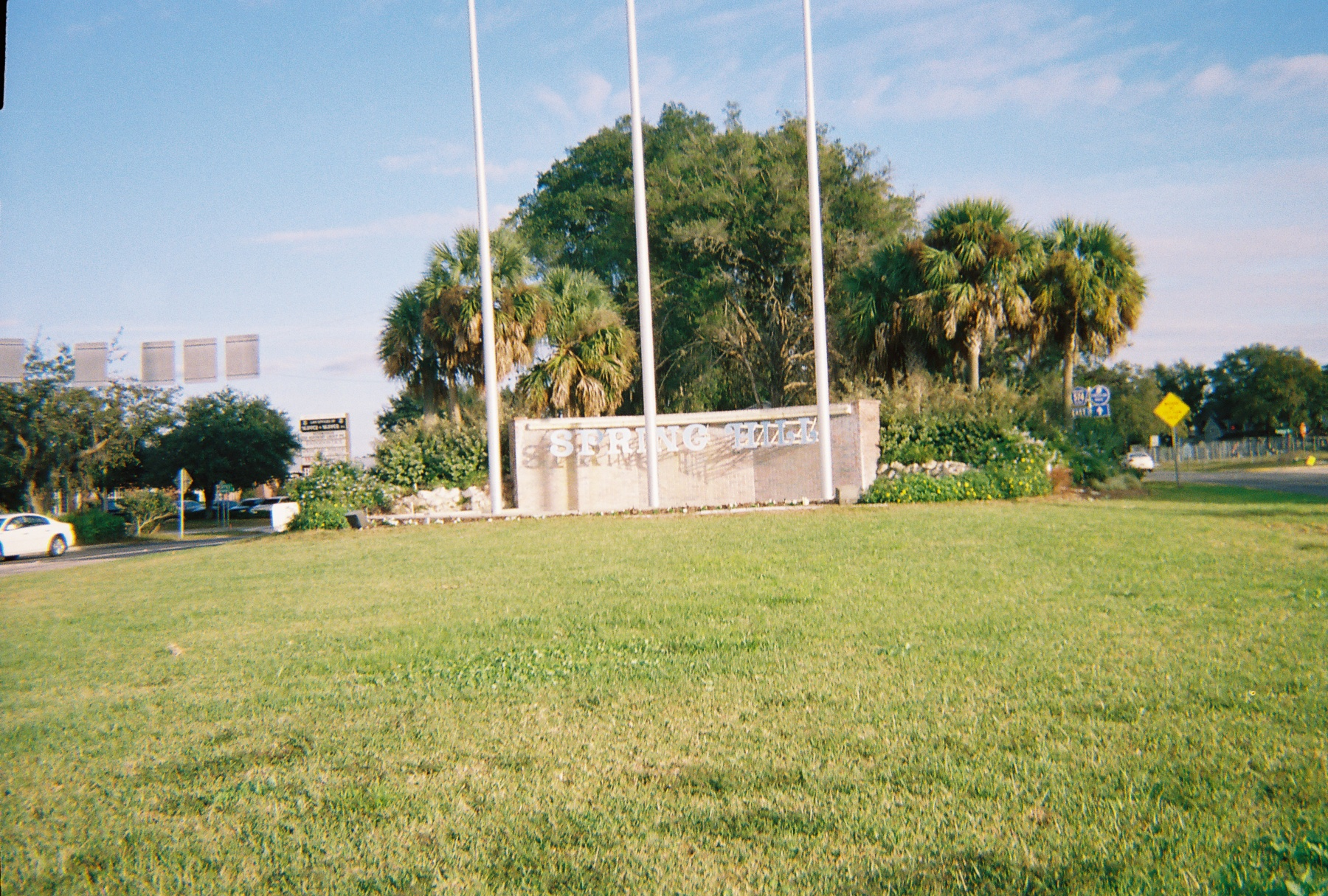
- The gateway to Spring Hill at US 19 and Spring Hill Drive

- Flag

- Location in Hernando County and the state of Florida
- Coordinates: 28°30′05″N 82°32′30″W
- Country: United States
- State: Florida
- County: Hernando

Area
  - Total: 62.30 sq mi (161.36 km^{2})
  - Land: 59.92 sq mi (155.19 km^{2})
  - Water: 2.38 sq mi (6.17 km^{2})
- Elevation: 43 ft (13 m)

Population (2020)
  - Total: 113,568
  - Density: 1,895.4/sq mi (731.81/km^{2})
- Time zone: UTC-5 (Eastern (EST))
  - Summer (DST): UTC-4 (EDT)
- ZIP codes: 34604-34610
- Area code: 352
- FIPS code: 12-68350
- GNIS feature ID: 2402888

Spring Hill is a census-designated place (CDP) in Hernando County, Florida, in the United States of America. The community is unincorporated. The population was 113,568 at the 2020 census, up from 98,621 at the 2010 census. Spring Hill belongs to Florida's Nature Coast region and is in the Tampa-St. Petersburg-Clearwater metro area. It is east of Hernando Beach, southwest of Brooksville, and north of Tampa.

== History and overview ==
The community first appeared on Hernando County maps as early as 1856 along what is today Fort Dade Avenue just north of the community of Wiscon.

The modern Spring Hill was founded in 1967 as a planned community, which was developed by the Deltona Corporation and the Mackle Brothers. The developers originally wanted to call the community "Spring Lake" and used that as the working name throughout the development process. Eventually, they were forced to use a different name due to the name Spring Lake already being in use locally and they chose "Spring Hill". The plans for the community are identical to the community of Deltona. The Mackle Brothers sold many of the properties and land in the area through intense advertising on a national scale. The community has since become a sprawling semi-city in its own right, although it is an unincorporated area. The main entrance to the original development is marked by the Spring Hill waterfall on Spring Hill Drive and U.S. Route 19 (Commercial Way).

Spring Hill's proximity to Tampa, 40 miles (64 km) to the south, and the completion of the Suncoast Parkway in 2001 have made the community easily accessible to the Tampa-St. Petersburg area.

== Geography ==
Spring Hill is located in southwestern Hernando County. It is bordered to the west by Timber Pines; to the north by Weeki Wachee, North Weeki Wachee, High Point, Brookridge, and Wiscon; and to the east by South Brooksville, Garden Grove, and Masaryktown. To the south it is bordered by Shady Hills and Heritage Pines in Pasco County.

== Census area ==
According to the United States Census Bureau, Spring Hill has a total area of 62.2 square miles (161.2 km^{2}), of which 59.8 square miles (154.9 km^{2}) are land and 2.4 square miles (6.3 km^{2}), or 3.94%, are water.

== Postal address ==
Postal mailing address names for this community are divided into "Shady Hills" and "Quail Ridge" for correct postal address coverage. The Spring Hill census designated place does not extend into neighboring Pasco County, so the U.S. Postal Service recommends that "Spring Hill" be used only as the mailing address for destinations in ZIP Code 34610 of Pasco County, not for postal customers in this Hernando County unincorporated community.

== Demographics ==
Historical population
Census	Pop.	Note	%±
1980	6,468		—
1990	31,117		381.1%
2000	69,078		122.0%
2010	98,621		42.8%
2020	113,568		15.2%

=== Racial and ethnic composition ===
Spring Hill racial composition (Hispanics excluded from racial categories) (NH = Non-Hispanic)
Race	Pop 2010	Pop 2020	% 2010	% 2020
White (NH)	77,399	78,660	78.48%	69.26%
Black or African American (NH)	4,485	5,646	4.55%	4.97%
Native American or Alaska Native (NH)	259	305	0.26%	0.27%
Asian (NH)	1,349	1,922	1.37%	1.69%
Pacific Islander or Native Hawaiian (NH)	38	51	0.04%	0.04%
Some other race (NH)	174	637	0.18%	0.56%
Two or more races/Multiracial (NH)	1,538	4,770	1.56%	4.20%
Hispanic or Latino (any race)	13,379	21,577	13.57%	19.00%
Total	98,621	113,568		

=== 2020 census ===
As of the 2020 census, Spring Hill had a population of 113,568, with 44,029 households and 30,380 families residing in the CDP.

The median age was 45.8 years. 20.1% of residents were under the age of 18 and 24.2% were 65 years of age or older. For every 100 females there were 92.2 males, and for every 100 females age 18 and over there were 89.8 males age 18 and over.

99.9% of residents lived in urban areas, while 0.1% lived in rural areas.

Of the 44,029 households, 28.0% had children under the age of 18 living in them. Of all households, 49.8% were married-couple households, 15.4% were households with a male householder and no spouse or partner present, and 26.5% were households with a female householder and no spouse or partner present. About 23.7% of all households were made up of individuals and 13.2% had someone living alone who was 65 years of age or older.

There were 47,302 housing units, of which 6.9% were vacant. The homeowner vacancy rate was 2.1% and the rental vacancy rate was 7.1%.

Racial composition as of the 2020 census
Race	Number	Percent
White	84,651	74.5%
Black or African American	6,232	5.5%
American Indian and Alaska Native	502	0.4%
Asian	2,004	1.8%
Native Hawaiian and Other Pacific Islander	61	0.1%
Some other race	6,178	5.4%
Two or more races	13,940	12.3%
Hispanic or Latino (of any race)	21,577	19.0%

=== 2010 census ===
As of the 2010 United States census, there were 98,621 people, 38,333 households, and 27,272 families residing in the CDP.

At the 2010 census, the population density was 1,649 inhabitants per square mile (637/km^{2}).

Of the 39,078 households in 2010, 29.8% had children under the age of 18 living with them, 53.6% were headed by married couples living together, 12.9% had a female householder with no husband present, and 28.9% were non-families. 23.1% of all households were made up of individuals, and 12.3% were someone living alone who was 65 years of age or older. The average household size was 2.49, and the average family size was 2.91.

In 2010, in the CDP, 21.6% of the population were under the age of 18, 7.2% were from 18 to 24, 21.9% were from 25 to 44, 27.1% were from 45 to 64, and 22.2% were 65 years of age or older. The median age was 44.3 years. For every 100 females there were 90.4 males. For every 100 females age 18 and over, there were 87.7 males.

=== Income ===
For the period 2013–17, the estimated median annual household income in the CDP was $45,468, and the median family income was $53,017. Male full-time workers had a median income of $39,478 versus $35,059 for females. The per capita income for the CDP was $22,349. About 10.7% of families and 14.9% of the total population were below the poverty line, including 22.6% of those under age 18 and 9.6% of those age 65 or over.

=== Languages ===
For the period 2013–17, English spoken as a first language accounted for 85.7% of the population, while 14.3% spoke other languages as their mother tongue. The most significant were Spanish speakers who made up 10.0% of the population.

== Education ==
Spring Hill has many schools, both public and private, which provide primary and secondary education to local children. There are also several options for higher education that are easily accessible from the Spring Hill area.

=== Public primary and secondary schools ===
Public schools in Spring Hill are part of the Hernando County School Board school system, which oversees all public schools in Hernando County. The main public schools that serve the Spring Hill area are:

High schools

- Central High School
- Frank W. Springstead High School, an IB World School
- Nature Coast Technical High School
- Weeki Wachee High School
- Hernando High School

Middle schools

- Fox Chapel Middle School
- Gulf Coast Academy of Science and Technology, a charter school
- Powell Middle School
- West Hernando Middle School

K-8 schools

- Challenger K-8 School of Science and Mathematics
- Explorer K-8
- John D. Floyd K-8 School of Environmental Science
- Winding Waters K-8

Elementary schools

- Chocachatti Elementary School
- Deltona Elementary School
- Pine Grove Elementary School
- Spring Hill Elementary school
- Suncoast Elementary School
- Westside Elementary School

=== Private schools ===
In addition to the public schools in Spring Hill, there are several private schools:

- Growing In Grace Preschool
- Notre Dame Catholic School (Pre-K to grade 8)
- Spring Hill Christian Academy (Pre-K to grade 12)
- Wider Horizons School, a Montessori school (Pre-K to grade 6) and College Preparatory school (junior and senior high school)
- West Hernando Christian School

=== Higher learning ===
Spring Hill is home to the 100,000-square-foot (9,300 m^{2}) Spring Hill Campus of Pasco–Hernando State College. This was the fourth campus built out of the five now in existence.

Northwestern Christian University, an online program, has its headquarters in Spring Hill.

=== Libraries ===
The Hernando County Library System operates several libraries in and around the Spring Hill area, such as the West Hernando Branch Library and the Spring Hill Branch Library that serves as a replacement of the Little Red Schoolhouse Branch Library. The historic Little Red Schoolhouse Branch Library has been converted into a bookstore, run by the Friends of the Library, whose proceeds benefit the library system.

== Healthcare ==
The only hospital that operates in Spring Hill is TGH Spring Hill.

== Tourism ==
Nearby Weeki Wachee Springs is home to the famous live mermaid show and Florida's only spring-fed water park, Buccaneer Bay.

== Media ==
There are two print newspapers that serve the area: the Hernando Times (a publication of Tampa Bay Times), and the Hernando Sun.

Spring Hill belongs in the Tampa Bay Area media market, the 12th largest designated market area in the United States.

== Notable people ==
- Douglas Applegate, member of the United States House of Representatives
- Matt Breida, former NFL running back
- Ricou Browning, film director, actor and producer
- Corey Hill, former UFC fighter
- Blaise Ingoglia, politician who is the current chief financial officer of Florida
- Zachary James, opera singer, stage and TV actor
- Alex Ruoff, former professional basketball player and current basketball coach
- Willie Sutton, bank robber
- Huey Whittaker, wide receiver for the Florida Tuskers

== Transportation ==
=== Mass transit ===
Public transit in Spring Hill is provided by Hernando County Transit (The Bus), which consists of four routes which serve Spring Hill and Brooksville, and which also provides a connection to the Pasco County Bus System (PCPT) via the Purple Route's terminus in Hudson. The Bus system operates six days a week since expanding to include Saturday service in October 2019.

The four current routes are:

- Purple: Pasco-Hernando State College - Brooksville to Spring Hill, final stop in Hudson, where it connects to Pasco County Transit (PCPT) Route 21
- Green: Brooksville US 41 & Wiscon Road via Wiscon Rd, California St and Spring Hill Drive to Pasco-Hernando State College Spring Hill Campus
- Red: Mariner & Northcliffe Boulevards via Northcliffe, Deltona, & Forest Oaks Boulevards, as well as US 19 to Pasco-Hernando State College Spring Hill Campus
- Blue: Brooksville Walmart (SR50) via Mariner Blvd to Bayfront Health Spring Hill (near Mariner Blvd & County Line Road)

Additionally, paratransit services are available via Trans-Hernando, which offers door-to-door services by advance reservation for the elderly, mentally challenged, and economic/transportation disadvantaged residents of Hernando County.

=== Roads ===
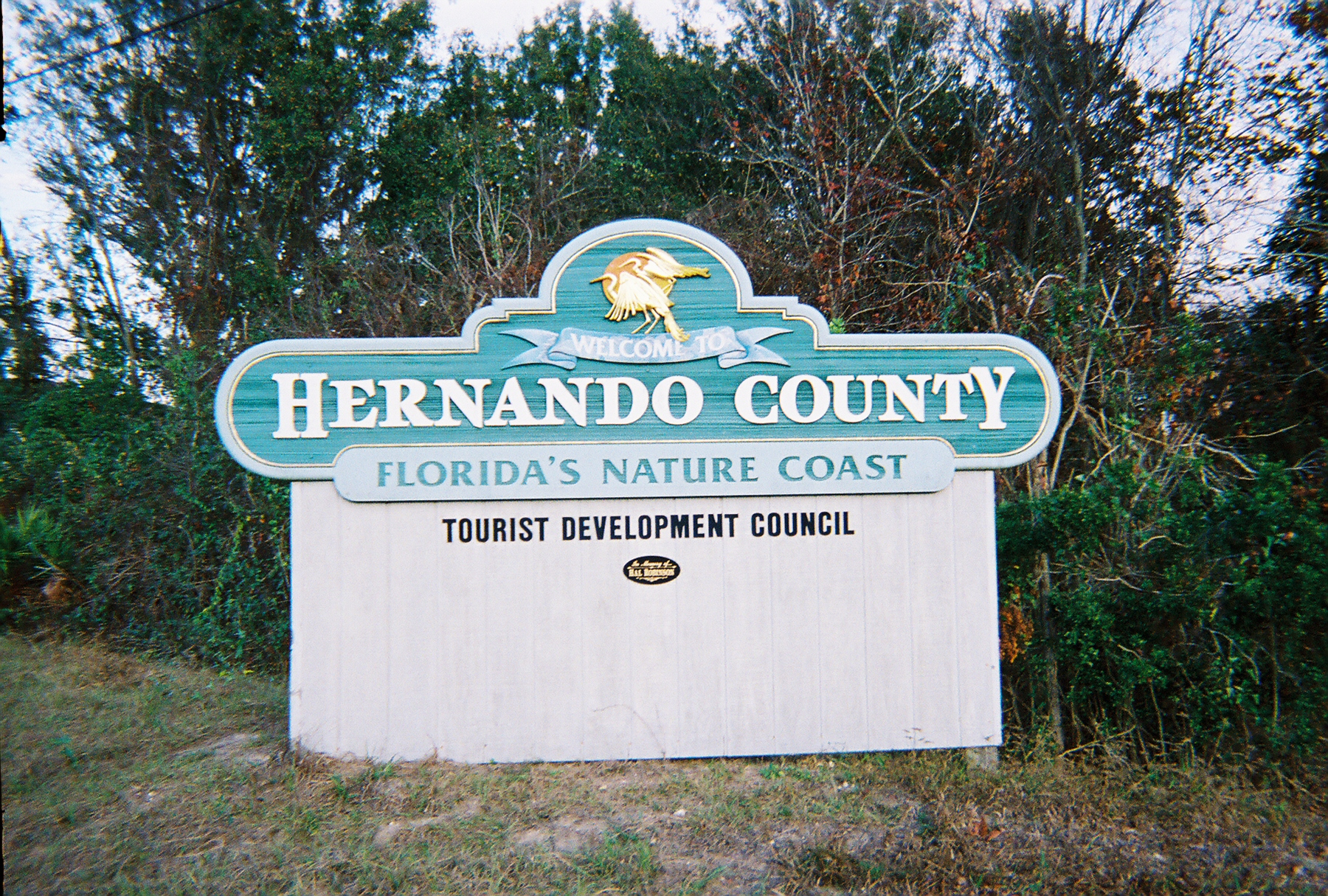
Tourism sign on US 19 just north of CR 578 (County Line Road)

There are several county roads in Spring Hill that serve as major thoroughfares for traffic traveling around and passing through Spring Hill. Below is a list of the county roads that pertain to Spring Hill:

CR #	Name	Direction
CR 572	Elgin Boulevard/Powell Road	East/West
CR 574	Spring Hill Drive	East/West
CR 578	County Line Road	East/West
CR 585	Barclay Avenue/Anderson Snow Road	North/South
CR 587	Mariner Boulevard	North/South
CR 589	Deltona Boulevard	North/South

=== Highways ===
Spring Hill is bordered to the west by US 19 (named Commercial Way), and to the north by SR 50 (named Cortez Boulevard). The Suncoast Parkway (SR 589) is a toll road that passes through Spring Hill and serves as a connection to Pasco and Hillsborough counties (and, by extension, Tampa) to the south.

== Gallery ==
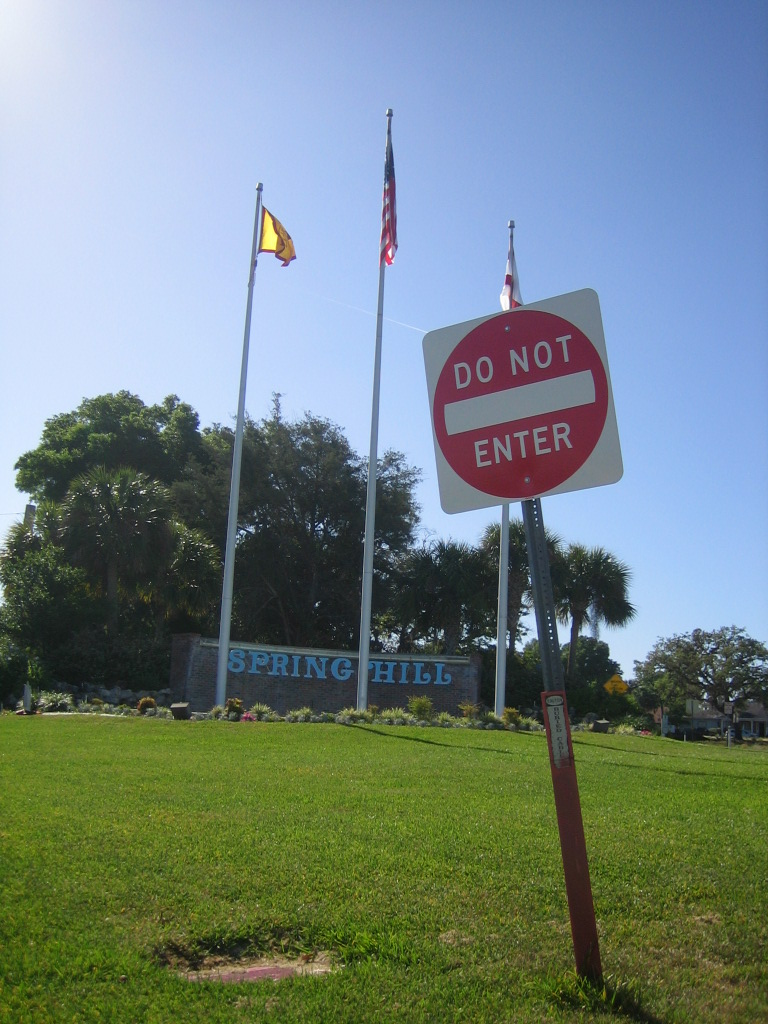
Spring Hill waterfall at US 19 and Spring Hill Drive

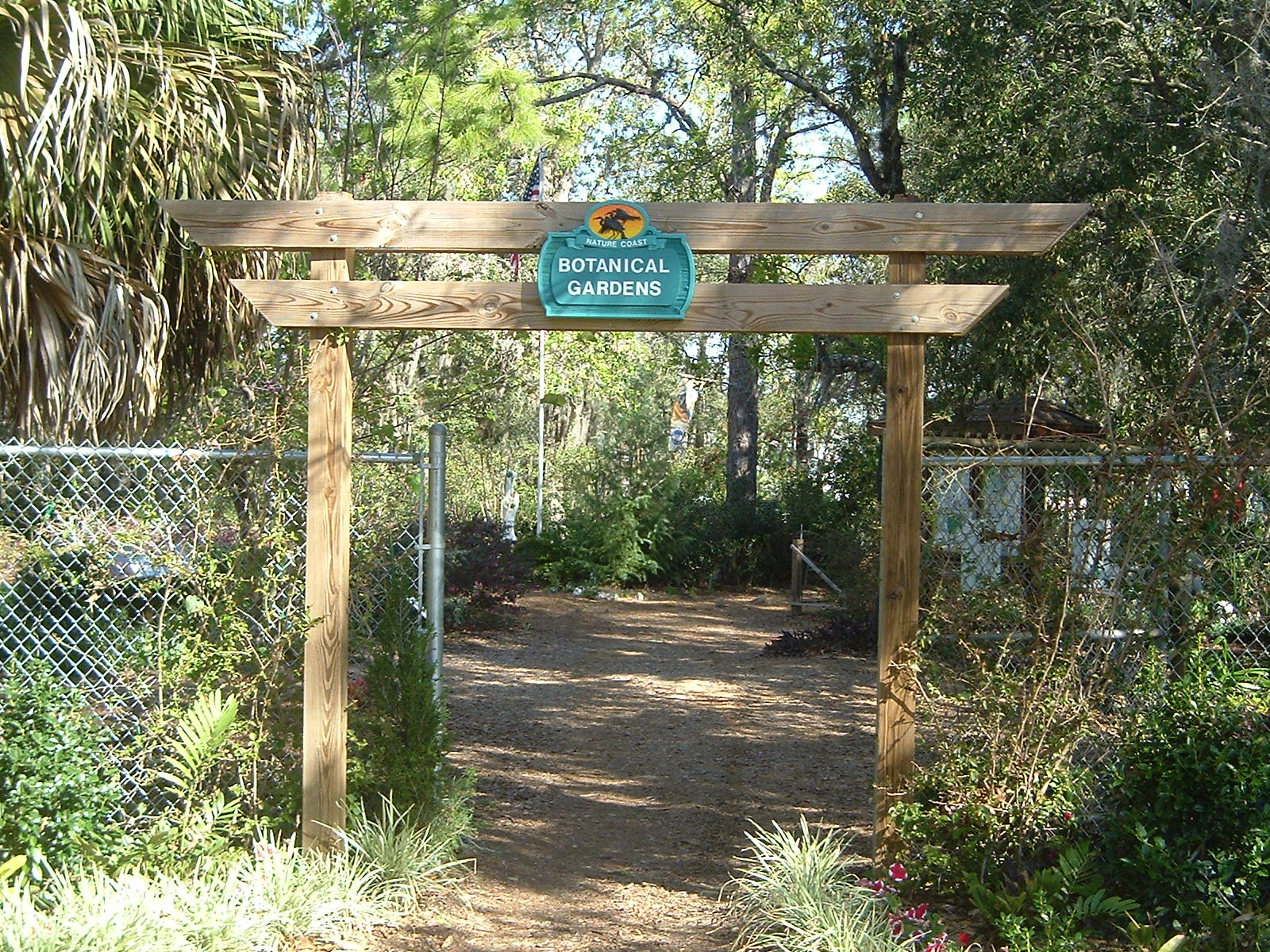
Entrance to the Nature Coast Botanical Gardens

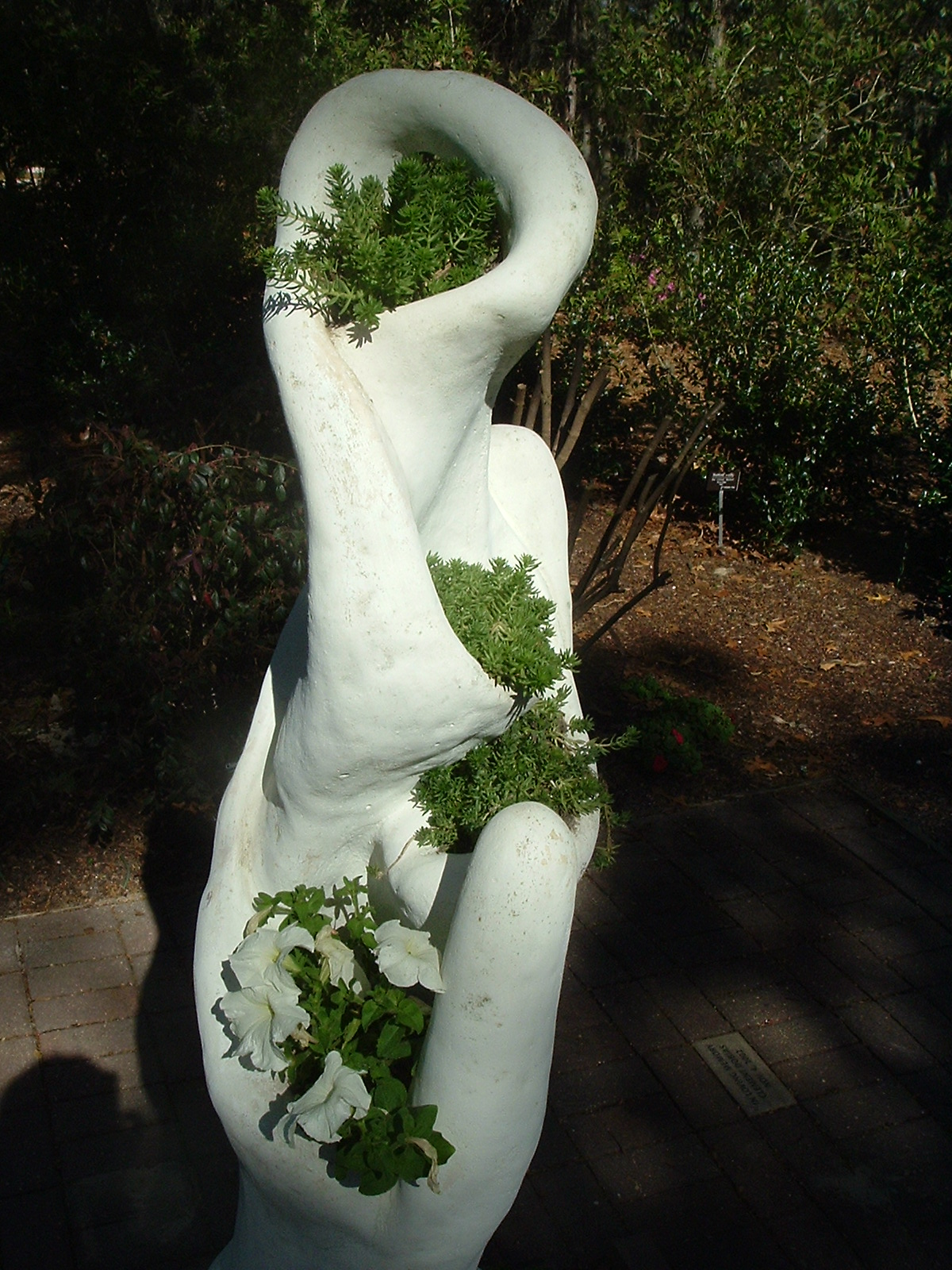
The Mother Earth sculpture, found in the Botanical Gardens

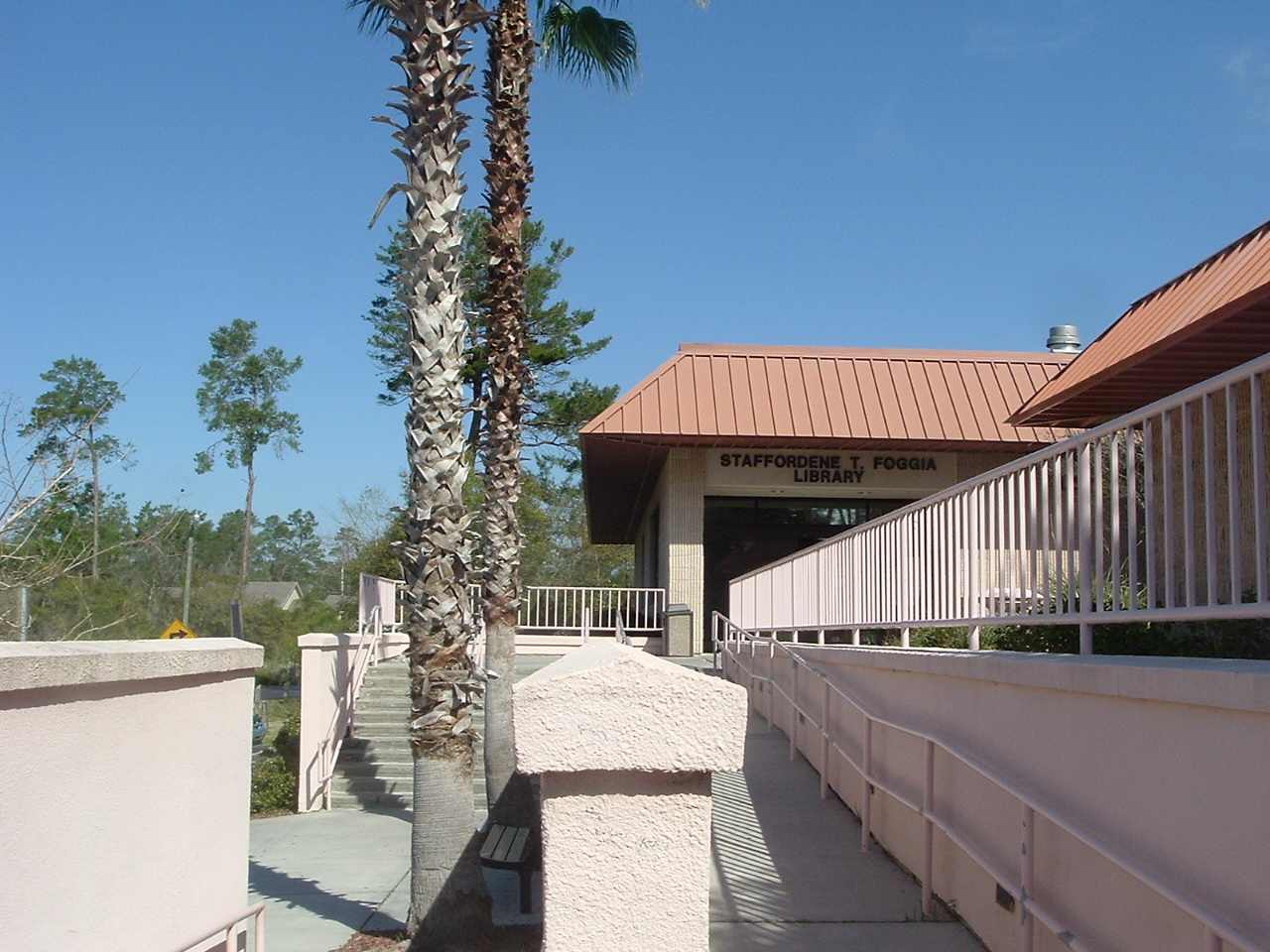
West Hernando County Library Branch

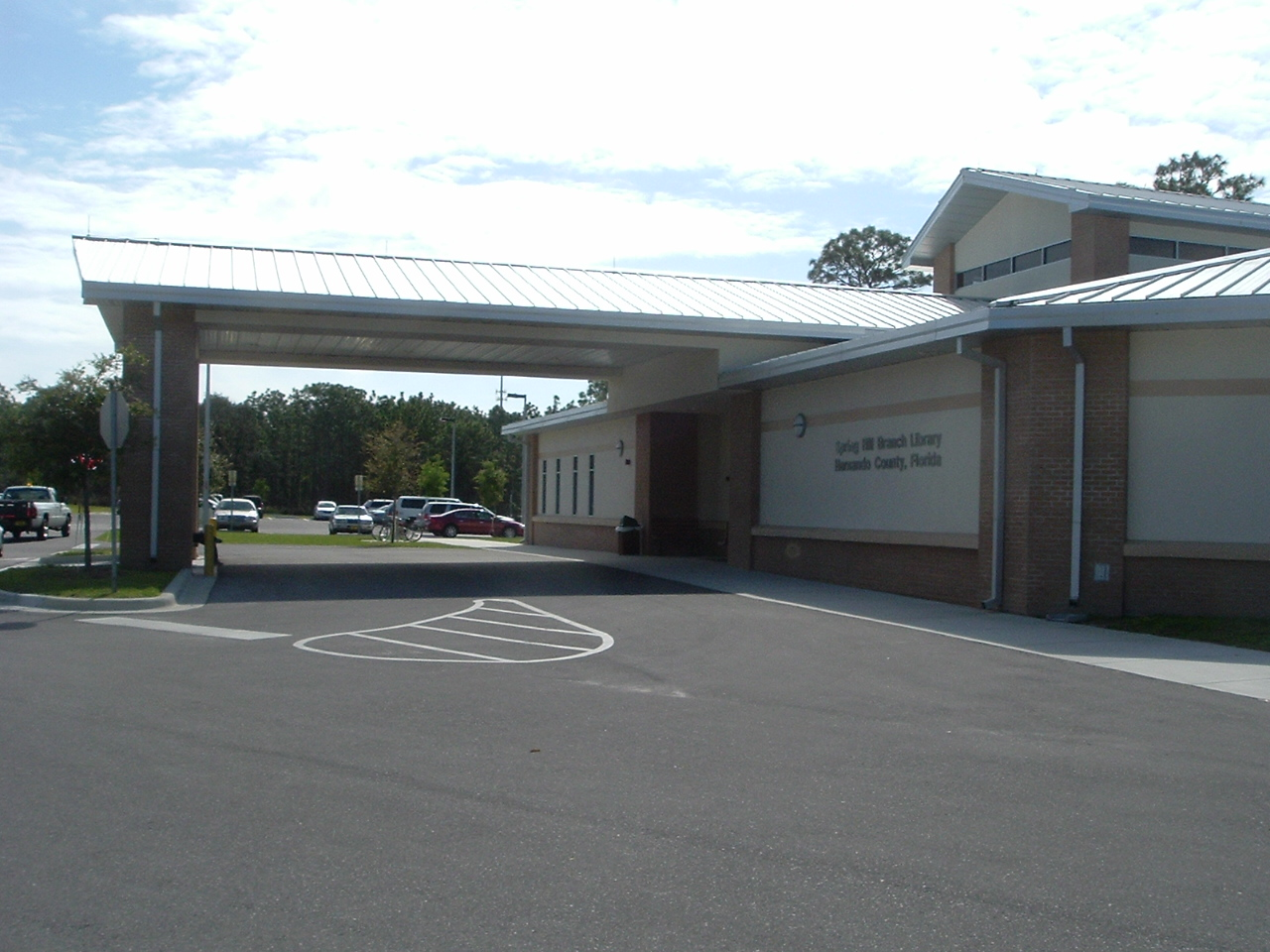
Spring Hill Library Branch

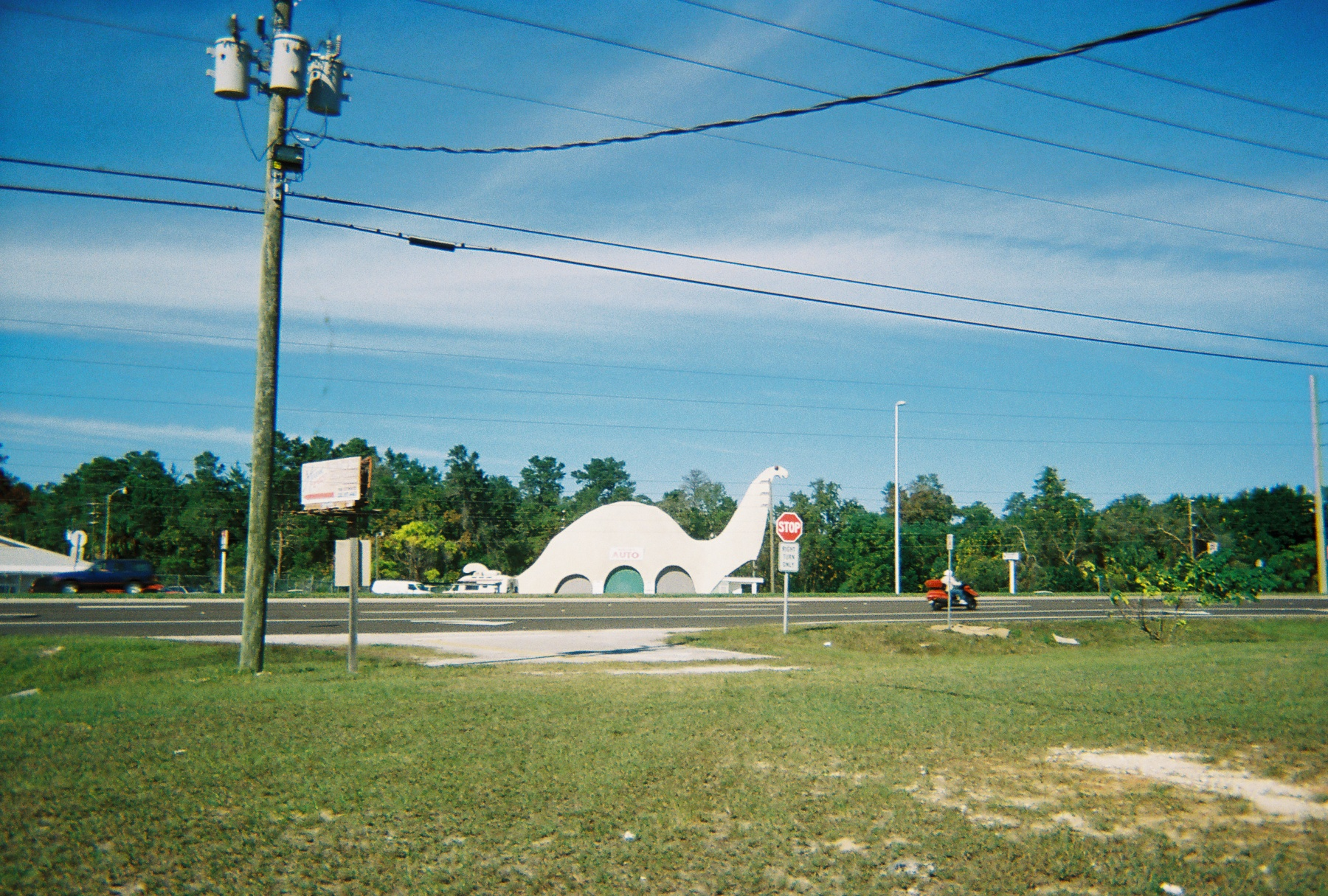
Harold's Garage on US 19 is a gas station shaped like a dinosaur, an example of novelty architecture.

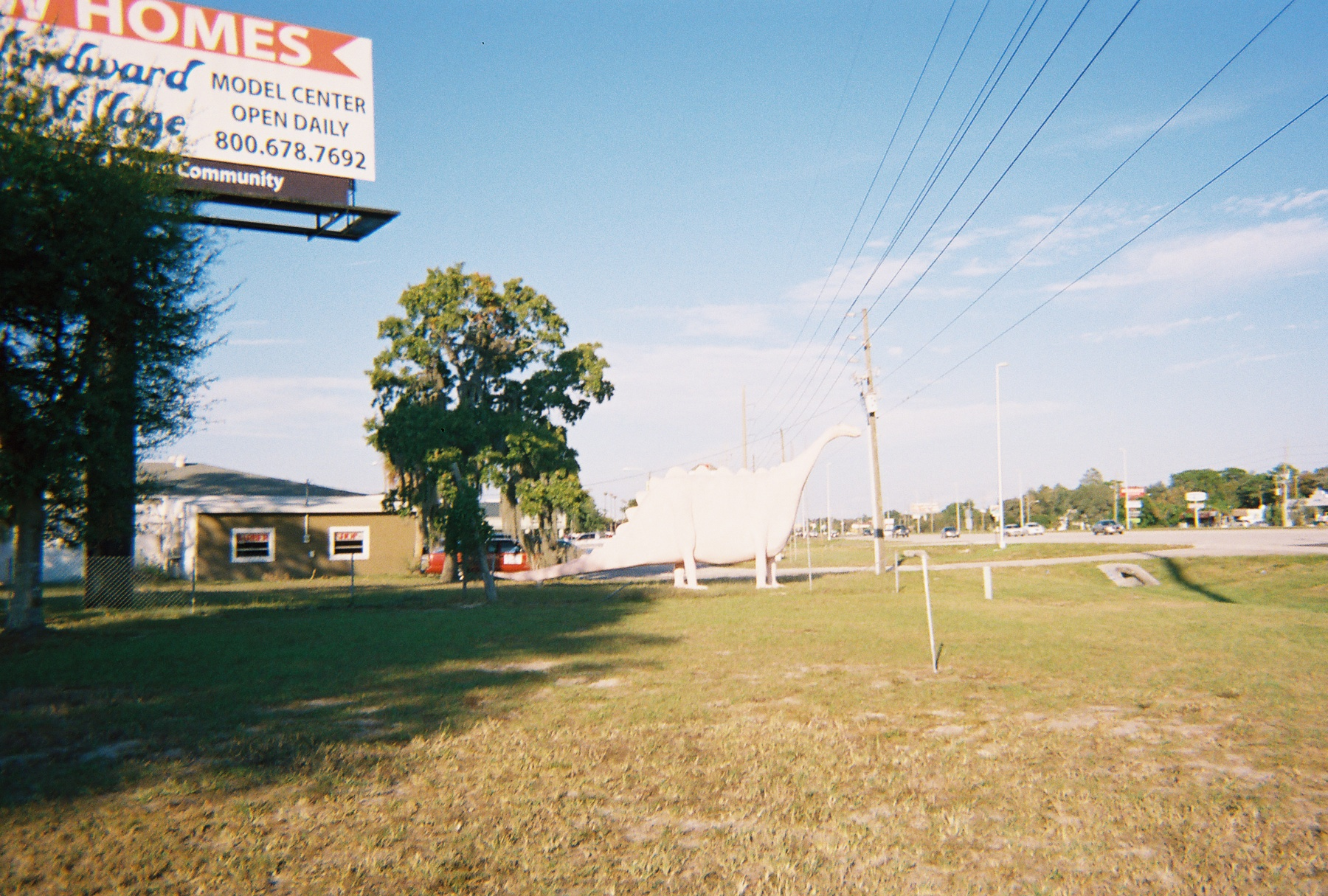
Pink apatosaurus statue on US 19 near Windward Village
