= TGH Spring Hill =

Non-profit hospital in Spring Hill, Florida

- Tampa General Hospital
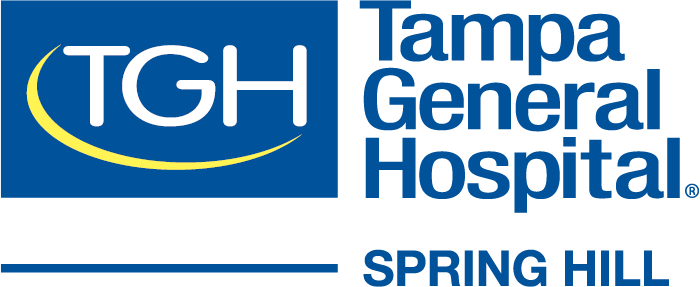

Geography
- Location: Spring Hill, Florida, United States
- Coordinates: 28°26′15″N 82°32′25″W

Organization
- Care system: Private hospital
- Type: General hospital

Services
- Emergency department: Yes
- Beds: 124

History
- Former names: Spring Hill Regional Hospital; Bayfront Health Spring Hill; Bravera Health Spring Hill
- Opened: October 1991

Links
- Website: www.tghnorth.org
- Lists: Hospitals in Florida

TGH Spring Hill is a non-profit hospital in Spring Hill, Florida, United States owned by Tampa General Hospital. It was purchased from Community Health Systems in July 2023.

== History ==
Regional Healthcare Inc. had Spring Hill Hospital built and equipped for $22 million. In October 1991, Spring Hill Hospital opened with 75 beds. This business venture failed, forcing Regional Healthcare Inc. to file for bankruptcy.

In late May 1998, a bankruptcy judge approved the acquisition of Regional Healthcare Inc. by Health Management Associates. Also the hospital network signed a thirty-year lease with Hernando County for Spring Hill Regional Hospital. Health Management Associates paid off $78 million of debt owned by Regional Healthcare Inc. to its creditors. It also paid Hernando County $300,000 each year in rent and it spent $25 million to make improvements on Brooksville Regional Hospital, Spring Hill Regional Hospital and PineBrook Regional Medical Center. On June 3, Health Management Associates announced that it had finished its acquisition of Regional Healthcare Inc.

In late June 2013, Spring Hill Hospital was rebranded by Health Management Associates to Bayfront Health Spring Hill. On July 30, Community Health Systems agreed to purchase Health Management Associates for $7.6 billion. On January 24, 2014, the Federal Trade Commission approved the merger of Health Management Associates with Community Health Systems.

On December 1, 2021, Bayfront Health Spring Hill rebranded to Bravera Health Spring Hill. On July 24, 2023, Community Health Systems announced that Tampa General Hospital would purchase Bravera Health Spring Hill and two other Bravera Health hospitals for $290 million. It was later adjusted to $294 million. On December 1, Tampa General Hospital took over the management of Bravera Health. Bravera Health Spring Hill was rebranded to TGH Spring Hill and will be part of the TGH North division.

== See also ==
- TGH Brooksville
- TGH Crystal River
