= TGH Crystal River =

Non-profit hospital in Crystal River, Florida, US

- Tampa General Hospital
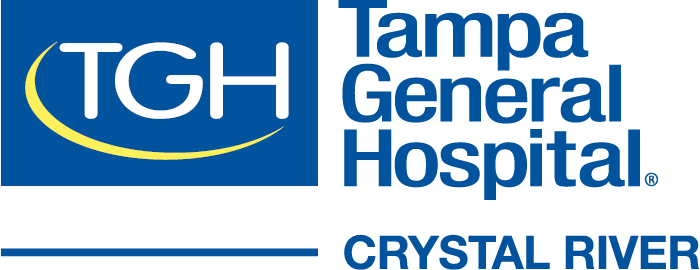

Geography
- Location: Crystal River, Florida, United States
- Coordinates: 28°57′7″N 82°37′28″W

Organization
- Care system: Private hospital
- Type: General hospital

Services
- Emergency department: Yes
- Beds: 128

History
- Former names: Seven Rivers Regional Medical Center; Bayfront Health Seven Rivers; Bravera Health Seven Rivers

Links
- Website: www.tghnorth.org
- Lists: Hospitals in Florida

TGH Crystal River is a non-profit hospital in Crystal River, Florida, United States owned by Tampa General Hospital. It was purchased from Community Health Systems in July 2023.

== History ==
On June 25, 2018, it was announced that Bayfront Health would acquire Seven Rivers Regional Medical Center. On July 1, Seven Rivers Regional Medical Center joined Bayfront Health and changed its name to Bayfront Health Seven Rivers.

On December 1, 2021, Bayfront Health rebranded to Bravera Health Seven Rivers. On July 24, 2023, Community Health Systems announced that Tampa General Hospital would purchase Bravera Health Seven Rivers and two other Bravera Health hospitals for $290 million. It was later adjusted to $294 million. On December 1, Tampa General Hospital officially took over the management of Bravera Health. Bravera Health Seven Rivers was rebranded to TGH Crystal River and will be part of the TGH North division.

== See also ==
- TGH Brooksville
- TGH Spring Hill
