= North Weeki Wachee, Florida =

- Census-designated place
- Location in Hernando County and the state of Florida
- Coordinates: 28°33′31″N 82°33′15″W
- Country: United States
- State: Florida
- County: Hernando

Area
  - Total: 15.58 sq mi (40.36 km^{2})
  - Land: 14.42 sq mi (37.35 km^{2})
  - Water: 1.17 sq mi (3.02 km^{2})
- Elevation: 20 ft (6.1 m)

Population (2020)
  - Total: 9,131
  - Density: 633/sq mi (244.5/km^{2})
- Time zone: UTC-5 (Eastern (EST))
  - Summer (DST): UTC-4 (EDT)
- FIPS code: 12-49905
- GNIS feature ID: 2403357

North Weeki Wachee is a census-designated place (CDP) in Hernando County, Florida, United States. As of the 2020 census, North Weeki Wachee had a population of 9,131.

== Geography ==
North Weeki Wachee is located in west-central Hernando County. It is bordered to the south by the communities of High Point, Spring Hill, and Weeki Wachee. U.S. Route 19 passes through the community, leading north 18 miles (29 km) to Homosassa Springs and south 15 miles (24 km) to Hudson. State Road 50 runs along part of the southern edge of North Weeki Wachee, leading east 11 miles (18 km) to Brooksville, the Hernando County seat.

According to the United States Census Bureau, the CDP has a total area of 15.4 square miles (39.8 km^{2}), of which 14.0 square miles (36.3 km^{2}) are land and 1.4 square miles (3.5 km^{2}), or 8.76%, are water.

== Demographics ==
Historical population
Census	Pop.	Note	%±
2020	9,131		—
U.S. Decennial Census

=== 2020 census ===
As of the 2020 census, North Weeki Wachee had a population of 9,131. The median age was 57.4 years. 13.9% of residents were under the age of 18 and 36.0% of residents were 65 years of age or older. For every 100 females there were 96.9 males, and for every 100 females age 18 and over there were 95.7 males age 18 and over.

98.3% of residents lived in urban areas, while 1.7% lived in rural areas.

There were 4,032 households in North Weeki Wachee, of which 18.0% had children under the age of 18 living in them. Of all households, 52.4% were married-couple households, 16.9% were households with a male householder and no spouse or partner present, and 23.3% were households with a female householder and no spouse or partner present. About 26.3% of all households were made up of individuals and 16.1% had someone living alone who was 65 years of age or older.

There were 4,578 housing units, of which 11.9% were vacant. The homeowner vacancy rate was 3.0% and the rental vacancy rate was 13.7%.

Racial composition as of the 2020 census
Race	Number	Percent
White	7,837	85.8%
Black or African American	214	2.3%
American Indian and Alaska Native	32	0.4%
Asian	118	1.3%
Native Hawaiian and Other Pacific Islander	9	0.1%
Some other race	209	2.3%
Two or more races	712	7.8%
Hispanic or Latino (of any race)	941	10.3%

=== 2000 census ===
As of the census in 2000, there were 4,253 people, 1,891 households, and 1,406 families residing in the CDP. The population density was 578.1 inhabitants per square mile (223.2/km^{2}). There were 2,265 housing units at an average density of 307.9 per square mile (118.9/km^{2}). The racial makeup of the CDP was 96.61% White, 0.99% African American, 0.40% Native American, 0.54% Asian, 0.02% Pacific Islander, 0.59% from other races, and 0.85% from two or more races. Hispanic or Latino of any race were 4.70% of the population.

There were 1,891 households, out of which 16.4% had children under the age of 18 living with them, 65.4% were married couples living together, 6.1% had a female householder with no husband present, and 25.6% were non-families. 21.7% of all households were made up of individuals, and 12.8% had someone living alone who was 65 years of age or older. The average household size was 2.24 and the average family size was 2.56.

In the CDP, the population was spread out, with 15.2% under the age of 18, 3.5% from 18 to 24, 17.8% from 25 to 44, 28.9% from 45 to 64, and 34.7% who were 65 years of age or older. The median age was 56 years. For every 100 females, there were 94.7 males. For every 100 females age 18 and over, there were 91.8 males.

The median income for a household in the CDP was $31,985, and the median income for a family was $37,694. Males had a median income of $33,594 versus $21,845 for females. The per capita income for the CDP was $22,186. About 3.8% of families and 5.9% of the population were below the poverty line, including 6.2% of those under age 18 and 4.9% of those age 65 or over.
