= TGH Brooksville =

Non-profit hospital in Florida, US

- Tampa General Hospital
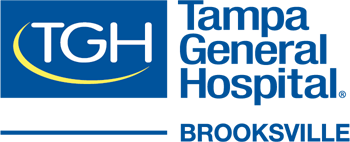

Geography
- Location: Brooksville, Florida, United States
- Coordinates: 28.5385°N 82.4431°W

Organization
- Care system: Private hospital
- Type: General hospital

Services
- Emergency department: Yes
- Beds: 120

History
- Former names: Hernando County Hospital; Lykes Memorial Hospital; Brooksville Regional Hospital; Bayfront Health Brooksville; Bravera Health Brooksville
- Opened: October 1, 1936

Links
- Website: www.tghnorth.org
- Lists: Hospitals in Florida

TGH Brooksville is a non-profit hospital in Brooksville, Florida, United States owned by Tampa General Hospital. It was purchased from Community Health Systems in July 2023.

== History ==
=== 20th century ===
Physician Samuel Carnes Harvard wanted to open a bigger hospital in Brooksville, Florida, with the help of Alfred McKethan, a local banker and businessman who donated land for the hospital. The Brooksville City Council and the Hernando County Commission supported building the hospital. Money was raised with bonds and donations, and Hernando County Hospital was built for $40,000. On October 1, 1936, it opened on U.S. Route 41.

In 1943, Hernando County Hospital expanded from 24 to 32 beds. It had an operating room delivery room and nursery. In 1948, eight beds were added to the hospital. In 1959, the first hospital administrator was hired for Hernando County Hospital.

In 1962, a bigger hospital with 50 beds was built. In 1967, Hernando County Hospital was renamed Lykes Memorial Hospital after the Lykes family founders of Lykes Brothers. In the same year Hernando County taxpayers supported expanding the hospital.

In 1970, Lykes Memorial Hospital was expanded to 115 beds with the help of a $300,000 county bond and a $550,000 state grant. Also added were a laboratory, physical therapy unit, intensive care unit, blood bank and X-ray department. In 1975, the hospital administrator was fired after the hospital almost failed due to $680,000 in unpaid patient bills.

In 1984, the Hernando County Commission stopped giving the hospital taxpayer money and hired Republic Health Corporation to manage the hospital.

In February 1990, Hernando County issued bonds to Regional Healthcare Inc. to renovate the hospital. In early November, Lykes Memorial Hospital became Brooksville Regional Hospital. In October 1991, the number of beds for the hospital was reduced to 91 after Spring Hill Regional Hospital opened. In 1993, Regional Healthcare Inc. and its hospitals filed for bankruptcy. The new board of directors at Regional Healthcare Inc. hired Quorum Health Resources to run Brooksville Regional Hospital. In 1996, the hospital had a $2.39 million profit.

In late May 1998, a bankruptcy judge approved the acquisition of Regional Healthcare Inc. by Health Management Associates. Also the hospital network signed a thirty year lease with Hernando County for Brooksville Regional Medical Center. Health Management Associates paid off $78 million of debt owned by Regional Healthcare Inc. to its creditors. It also paid Hernando County $300,000 each year in rent and it spent $25 million to make improvements on Brooksville Regional Hospital, Spring Hill Regional Hospital and PineBrook Regional Medical Center. On June 3, Health Management Associates announced that it had finished its acquisition of Regional Healthcare Inc.

=== 21st century ===
In 2011, Brooksville Regional Hospital charged patients $104,000. That was way higher than the $62,092 state average.

In late June 2013, Brooksville Regional Hospital was rebranded by Health Management Associates to Bayfront Health Brooksville. On July 30, Community Health Systems agreed to purchase Health Management Associates for $7.6 billion. On January 24, 2014, the Federal Trade Commission approved the merger of Health Management Associates with Community Health Systems.

On December 1, 2021, Bayfront Health Brooksville rebranded to Bravera Health Brooksville. On July 24, 2023, Community Health Systems announced that Tampa General Hospital would purchase Bravera Health Brooksville and two other Bravera Health hospitals for $290 million. It was later adjusted to $294 million. On December 1, Tampa General Hospital took over the management of Bravera Health. Bravera Health Brooksville was rebranded to TGH Brooksville and will be part of the TGH North division.

== See also ==
- TGH Crystal River
- TGH Spring Hill
