= Florida State Road 500 =

State highway in Florida, United States

State Road 500
- SR 500 in red, SR 500A in blue

Route information
- Maintained by FDOT
- Length: 197.949 mi (318.568 km)
- Existed: 1945–present

Major junctions
- South end: US 192 / SR A1A in Indialantic
- US 17 / US 92 / SR 50 in Orlando; US 301 / US 441 in Ocala
- North end: US 19 / US 98 / US 27 Alt. in Chiefland

Location
- Country: United States
- State: Florida
- Counties: Brevard, Osceola, Orange, Seminole, Lake, Sumter, Marion, Levy

Highway system
- Florida State Highway System; Interstate; US; State; Former; Pre‑1945; Toll; Scenic
← SR 492	→ SR 501

State Road 500 (SR 500) is a state highway running through Florida as a mostly unsigned route under several U.S. Highways. From Chiefland to Williston it is U.S. Highway 27 Alternate (US 27 Alt.). From Williston to Ocala, it is US 27. From Ocala to Holopaw, it is US 441. From Kissimmee to Indialantic it is US 192.

Names for State Road 500 include Young Boulevard, 100th Street, Hathaway Avenue, Noble Avenue, Blichton Road, 10th Street, Pine Street, Abshier Boulevard, North Boulevard, Main Street, Burleigh Boulevard, Orange Blossom Trail, East Irlo Bronson Memorial Highway, Space Coast Parkway, New Haven Avenue the Melbourne Causeway and Fifth Avenue.

== Route description ==
=== U.S. Route 27 Alternate and U.S. Route 27 ===
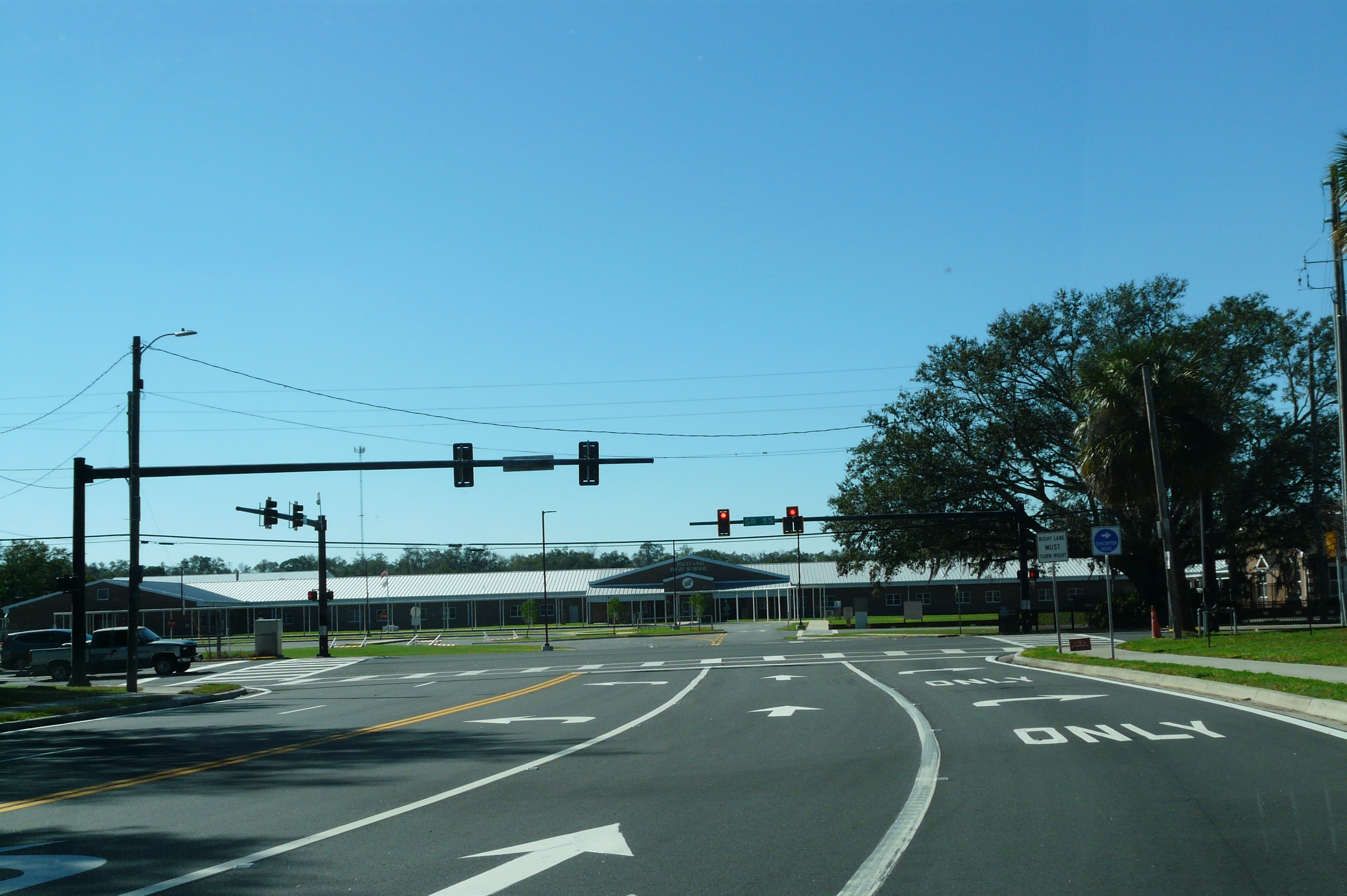
The western terminus/eastern beginning of FL 500 at US 19/98 (hidden SR 55) in Chiefland. Northbound US 27 ALT continues north by joining northbound US 19/98 until it reaches Perry.

State Road 500 (SR 500) begins at US 19-US 98 and hidden SR 55 in Chiefland hidden under U.S. Highway 27 Alternate (US 27 Alt.), which had already been running along US 19 and 98 starting in Perry. The route begins as Northeast Eighth Avenue for one block, then curves to the southeast onto North Youngs Boulevard. The routes run southeast along the eastern edge of the city, until the eastern terminus of Florida State Road 345. East of there, US Alt 27/SR 500 runs straight east, running through small farming communities that include intersections with minor county roads then approaches a pair of bridges over the Little Waccassa River, where the routes curve southeast again. Branching off to the left is Former State Road 32, which runs straight west-to-east to some important county facilities. Crossing under a power line right-of-way, the routes enter Bronson and are given the name "North Hathaway Avenue." Though the road remains four lanes, the divider is replaced by a continuous left-turn lane just before the signalized intersection with Florida State Road 24 (Thrasher Drive), where the street name changes from North Hathaway Avenue to East Hathaway Avenue. The next intersections are Main Street, then Levy County Road 24B. Later, northbound Levy County Road 337 joins the route in a diagonal one-block wrong-way concurrency with US Alternate 27 between Pennsylvania Avenue and South Court Street. Leaving Bronson, the division in the highway widens again.

Entering Williston the road is given the name "West Noble Avenue." The route curves straight east where it is joined by U.S. Route 41 (US 41) along with hidden SR 45 and exposed SR 121. From that intersection with Southwest and Northwest Seventh Streets, US 41-Alt. 27 and SR 121 follow SR 500 along West Noble Avenue into Downtown Williston. Across from the abandoned Seaboard Air Line Railroad depot, US Alternate Route 27 ends at US 27. US Route 41, hidden SR 45 and SR 121 turn left onto northbound US 27 (North Main Street), while eastbound SR 500 continues straight ahead onto southbound US 27, which is now East Noble Avenue. The site of the former competing Atlantic Coast Line Railroad depot can be found on the same side of the road at the crossing of Florida Northern Railroad's West Coast Subdivision. In East Williston, the road curves from east to southeast as the intersection with Levy CR 318 runs straight ahead towards rural communities in northern Marion County. From this point, the surroundings consist mainly of farm and ranch land, including some horse farms with private racetracks. US Alt. 27/SR 500 crosses the Levy-Marion County Line between the intersections of Levy CR 335 and Marion CR 316. The horse farms and other ranches continues as it cuts through Blitchton where it encounters the intersection with Marion County Road 326, a bi-county extension of Florida State Road 326. Horse farms become more abundant as the road enters Fellowship, where it intersects the eastern terminus of Marion CR 464B (a former section of Florida State Road 464), and later the southern terminus of Marion CR 225.

The routes officially enter the City of Ocala as Northwest Blichton Avenue just before the interchange with Interstate 75 at Exit 354. An increase in industrial development has been occurring on the northeast corner of the interchange within the past decade. After the intersection with northwest 30th Avenue (Marion CR 500A), the route curves straight west-to-east onto Northwest Tenth Street. This area consists of mixed commercial and residential development. US 27 and SR 500 turn south onto US 301-US 441 (Pine Avenue) along with hidden state roads 25 and 200. Tenth Street continues east from this intersection onto Florida State Road 492 (Bonnie Heath Boulevard). A total of three US Highways (27, 301, and 441) as well as three hidden state roads (25, 200, and 500) rise above a bridge over the CSX Wildwood Subdivision and other railroad sidings, then has an intersection with the main crossroad in the city, specifically Florida State Road 40 (a.k.a., Silver Springs Boulevard). Ten blocks later, Florida State Road 200 branches off to the right at Southwest 10th Street, to head southwest towards Marion Oaks and Hernando.

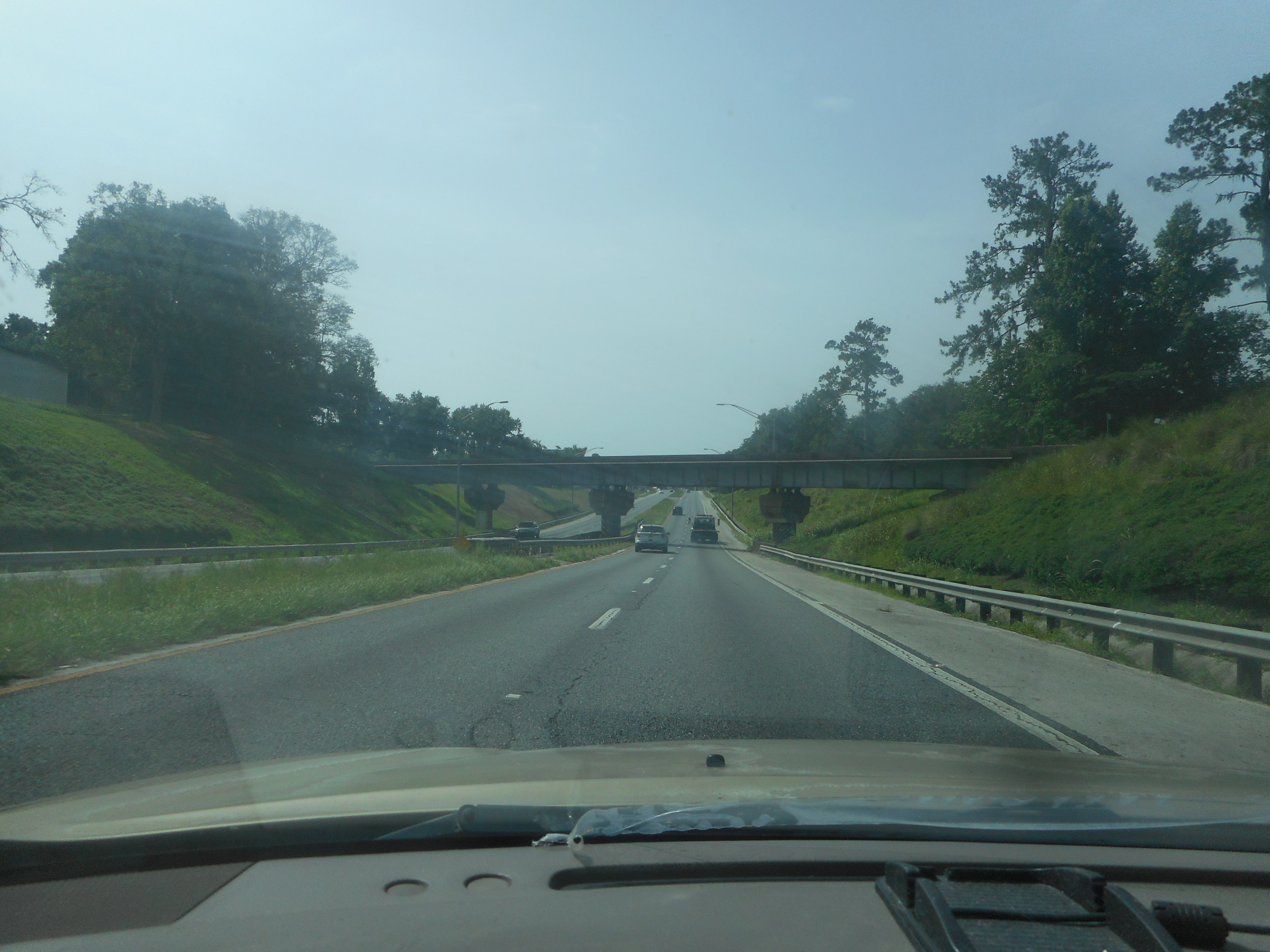
Southbound SR 500 joins US 27, 301 and 441 under and old Seaboard Air Line Railroad bridge in southern Ocala.

Just before a slight curve to the southeast, SR 500 has its first major intersection with Florida State Road 464 (Southwest 17th Street). Remaining at this angle the routes approach a bridge under the CSX Wildwood Subdivision. The routes make curve more toward east-southeast at Southeast 32nd and 31st Streets only to curve back to the previous angle at the intersection with Lake Weir Road, also unsigned Marion CR 464A. US 27, 301 and 441, as well as hidden routes 25 and 500 don't officially leave the Ocala City Limits until just south of Ocala Twin Drive-In movie theater. The median widens in Santos just before the intersection with Marion County Road 328 where it crosses the site of the formerly proposed Cross Florida Barge Canal. After this widened median ends, the road encounters the northern terminus of the Belleview Bypass at the 92nd Street Loop. Shortly after this intersection, the routes enter Belleview itself. Across from the eastern terminus of Marion CR 484, Florida State Road 25 branches off onto a separate road, which will soon become a county road that moves around the east coast of Lake Weir. US 301 breaks away onto southbound hidden SR 35 to head south into Wildwood, Bushnell and Dade City, while US 27 and 441 takes northbound SR 35 on a wrong way concurrency onto one last bridge over the Wildwood Subdivision towards a separate exposed route at the intersection with Baseline Road. The next intersection will be Marion County Road 25A.

The southern intersection with the Belleview Bypass is encountered again at 132nd Street Road just as US 27-441-SR 500 enters Summerfield. From there it continues as a straight semi-rural northwest to southeast four-lane divided highway. The last resemblance to a major intersection in Marion County is Marion CR 42, a bi-county road that spans from Pedro towards the southern edges of Ocala National Forest. South of CR 42, the route enters the ever-growing retirement community known as The Villages. Within this community, the route crosses the Marion-Sumter County Line, then bisects the northeastern corner of Sumter County before crossing the Sumter-Lake County Line. Within the Town of Lady Lake, US 27-441 and hidden SR 500 intersects Lake County Road 25, which until the early-2020's ran above a flyover with both CR 25 and the right-of-way for the former ACL High Springs—Croom Line. SR 25 rejoins US 27-441 and hidden SR 500 as an additional hidden route. South of there, it passes through Fruitland Park, which is the headquarters of the LakeXpress bus service, and the entrance to Lake Griffin State Park.

=== U.S. Route 441 and Orange Blossom Trail ===
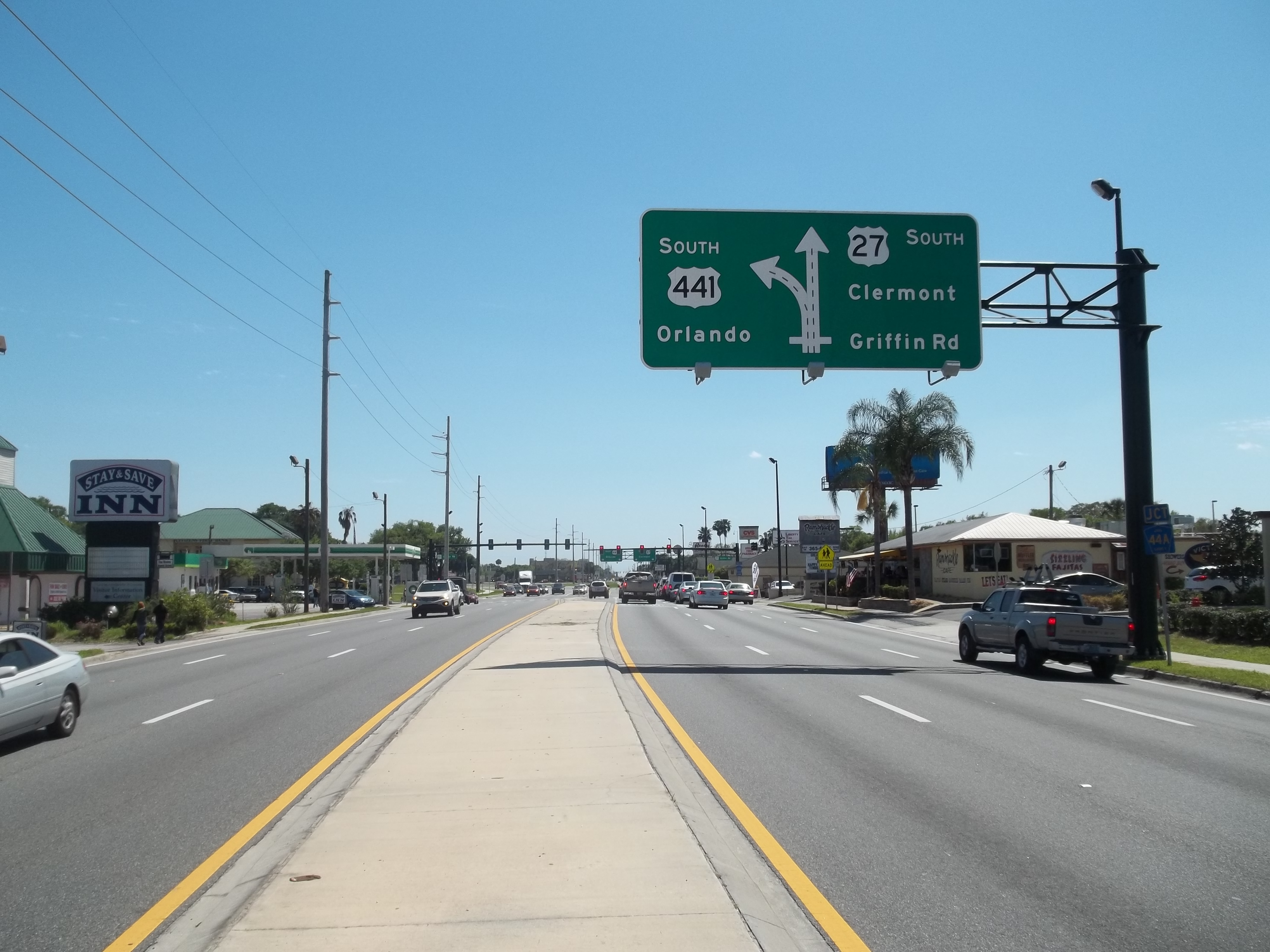
SR 500 leaves US 27/SR 25 along US 441 in Leesburg

In Leesburg US 27 and hidden SR 25 continue straight south along 14th Street, while US 441 and SR 500 branch off to the southeast onto North Boulevard. Running in close proximity to the southern coast of Lake Griffin, North Boulevard passes by the Herlong Park and Fishing Pier, then crosses the Tav-Lee Trail just before entering eastern Leesburg, where the route joined by Florida State Road 44. US 441 shares hidden overlaps of both SRs 500 and 44 as it winds through a strip of land between Lake Griffin and Lake Harris. A former segment of SR 44 (now Lake CR 44) breaks away just before SR 500 and company pass by the western and northern edge of the Leesburg International Airport. After some more commercial development, most of which is on the north side the routes climb the embankments of a pair of bridges over the Dead River between Lake Harris and Lake Eustis, then after the Lake Eustis Boat Launch area, another set of bridges over the Dora Canal.

In Tavares the route encounters a fork in the road with Florida State Road 500A, then is joined by yet another overlap, this time with Florida State Road 19. Together US 441, SRs 19, 44 and 500 all cross a railroad line owned by the Florida Central Railroad that was originally part of the St. Johns and Lake Eustis Railway. SR 19 branches off to the north at an interchange that includes Lake CR 19A. Entering Mount Dora, eastbound SR 44 branches off to the north across from an intersection with North Donnelley Street and former Lake CR 44B. From that point, US 441-FL 500 curve from east to south. After passing by three flea markets next door to one another, US 441 and SR 500 encounters a south-to-eastbound flyover ramp leading to their first major intersection with Florida State Road 46. Until the late-2010's, the intersection was a diamond interchange. As the routes cross the Lake-Orange County Line, they immediately enter Tangerine and the streets they run along gain the name Orange Blossom Trail. Less than a mile after entering Orange County, the routes encounter the channelized intersection with Orange CR 500A (Old Highway 441). South of there, it passes along the east side of Lake Ola. In Zellwood US 441/SR 500 run parallel the Florida Central Railroad (FCEN) on the southwest side of the road. Both the FCEN and US 441-SR 500 run parallel to a local airstrip known as the Orlando-Apopka Airport. In Apopka, a connecting road to Orange CR 437 leads to a SPUI interchange with Florida State Road 429 and Florida State Road 414 at exit 34. The interchange was built here in order to avoid the risk of encountering the Florida Central Railroad line. At the border between Apopka and Plymouth, the tracks move away from the side of the road, only to return just before the unfinished interchange with Florida State Road 451. The routes continue to run southeast until the intersection with South Central Avenue when they briefly run straight east, passing under a decorative rail trail bridge for the West Orange Trail east of the intersection with Forest Avenue. At the partial interchange with Florida State Road 436, US 441 and SR 500 turn to the southeast while SR 436 resumes the straight-eastbound trajectory after the bridge over northbound US 441 and westbound SR 500.

For a short distance, the routes enter southwestern Forest City in Seminole County, then re-enter Orange County in the suburban community of Lockhart where it encounters Florida State Road 414 again, this time at exit 9. Southeast of that intersection, the routes cross a pair of bridges over the FCEN. The intersection with Clarcona-Ocoee Road is where the routes finally enter the City of Orlando, specifically the Rosemont neighborhood. The Florida Central Railroad line returns to the side of US 441/SR 500 when the routes pass under Florida State Road 434 (John Young Parkway) immediately before the intersection with Florida State Road 423 (Lee Road), where SR 423 itself transitions from John Young Parkway to Lee Road. Southeast of this unorthodox interchange, the Orange Blossom Trail runs along the west bank of Lake Fairview and two smaller lakes that flow into it. This section is on the eastern edge of the Princeton/Silver Star section of the city. North of the intersection with Silver Star Road, and industrial siding from the FCEN crosses the roadway. The next major intersection is with Florida State Road 438 (Princeton Street). Southeast of that intersection, the routes cross another industrial siding from the railroad.

At the intersection with Florida State Road 50 on the border between the Spring Lake and College Park sections of Orlando (also known as Parramore), US 441-SR 500 are joined by US 17-92 (and hidden SR 600). South of here, the routes move away from the Florida Central Railroad tracks and encounters the intersection with Orange County Road 526 and Florida State Road 526 (West Washington Street) then intersects with roads that run west towards Camping World Stadium, the home of the former Tangerine Bowl and Orlando Citrus Bowl before encountering the interchange with Florida State Road 408 at exit 9. South of this toll road, the routes pass through the Holden Heights section of the city. The surroundings consist mostly of automotive-related businesses, restaurants, no-frills motels and some "gentlemen's clubs," but also includes an Amazon Logistics Warehouse, and a Waste-Pro franchise. Among the numerous intersections in this section of the city, US 17-92-441 and hidden SRs 500-600 crosses Michigan Street, an otherwise less important street which receives traffic from westbound Interstate 4 at Exit 81. The routes don't encounter Interstate 4 itself until three blocks to the south at Exit 80. South of I-4, OBT runs along the border between Orlando to the west and Holden Lakes to the east. The road finally leaves Orlando at the intersection of Americana Boulevard. Further away from Orlando, the routes run between Oak Ridge and Sky Lake, where the Orange Blossom Trail intersects SR 482 then passes by The Florida Mall. South of the mall, OBT then comes to a massive combined interchange with Florida's Turnpike at exit 254 and Florida State Road 528 (Beachline Expressway) at Exit 4, though access to and from Toll SR 528 is available via local roads, such as West Landstreet Road north of the interchange and Consulate Drive south of the interchange.

US 17-92-441 and SRs 500-600 enter Hunter's Creek at the interchange with Florida State Road 417 (Exit 11). South of the interchange, the routes serve as the location for the pre-Disney era tourist attraction known as Gatorland. The intersection of Mary Louise Road is where the routes cross the Orange-Osceola County Line, passing by the corporate headquarters for Tupperware, which is north of the Osceola County School for the Arts. The truck route for U.S. Routes 17 and 92 begins at the intersection with Osceola Parkway, running in an overlap west of the intersection until it reaches the interchange with John Young Parkway then turns south. At the shared intersection of Old Dixie Highway (Osceola CR 527) and Benita Street, Orange Blossom Trail becomes North Main Street, but still remains a de-facto continuation of Orange Blossom Trail. Commercial development continues to surround both sides of the street as they run down to the Downtown Historic Kissimmee.

=== U.S. Route 192 to the Metropolitan Melbourne area ===
Before reaching Downtown Kissimmee southbound US 441 and eastbound SR 500 turn left and join eastbound US 192, while southbound US 17 and westbound US 92 (not to mention hidden SR 600) turn right and joins westbound US 192 (hidden SR 530). Main Street continues through downtown before rejoining US 17-92. Shortly after ditching US 17 and 92, US 192/441 and SRs 500 and 530 encounter a railroad crossing with the SunRail main line. This segment of the commercial development around US 192 is less tourist oriented than the segment west of US 17-92. After crossing bridges over Mill Slough and passing by the Osceola Campus of Valencia College, the routes curve to the east-southeast. Hidden SR 530 branches off from the overlap at Osceola CR 530 which runs northeast to Bullock Lake. Hidden SR 500 continues along US 192/441 as it passes by Silver Spurs Arena Complex and the Osceola County Fairgrounds, which is across from the Gateway High School complex. US 192/441 and SR 500 passes over another set of bridges over Bass Slough before passing two intersections, the second of which (Cross Prairie Parkway) is also shared by the interchange with Florida's Turnpike at exit 244. Just after passing under the turnpike itself, the road encounters the northbound off-ramp from the turnpike. A few minor intersections are encountered before the routes cross bridges over the Saint Cloud Canal just at the border of the City of Saint Cloud. At Old Canoe Creek Road and Neptune Road, the routes encounter the eastern terminus of CR 525. Right after the intersection with Budinger and Columbia Avenues, US 192/441 and SR 500 turns straight west to east, and also contains the somewhat hidden name of 13th Street. Between Wisconsin and Ohio Avenue, the routes run along the southern border of the St. Cloud Downtown Historic District, and also passes by Veterans Park between Massachusetts and Pennsylvania Avenues across the street from the historic district.

Far enough from the historic district, US 192/441 and SR 500 enters the Ashton section of the city. Numbered street names in St. Cloud, including 13th Street end at Osceola County Road 15 which is also the beginning of hidden SR 15. From there US 192-441 and SRs 15-500 curves slightly towards the southeast, officially leaving the city limits just before it passes the intersection with CR 532 (Nova Road). From there, the road passes model homes, churches and a motel before the Reptile World Serpentarium. Across from that, the south side of the road is flanked by a frontage road named "Alligator Lake Shore Drive West" which used to be a former segment of the route, and includes access roads from the main route. Both the current and former roads contain bridges over a canal between Alligator Lake and Lake Lizzie, though the frontage road's bridge is a pedestrian bridge today. The section on the east side of the canal is accessible by one road, Lakeside Inn Drive. Alligator Lake Shore Drive ends at a dead end across from the intersection with Former Florida State Road 500A.

Beyond this point, US 192 and 441 as well as hidden SRs 15 and 500 pass through Harmony, an enlarged region of mostly rural surroundings with random cluster developments that will give way to preserved landscapes. In Holopaw, US 441 finally leaves SR 500 on its way to Miami, taking hidden SR 15 down to Belle Glade. East of the US 441 overlap US 192/SR 500 passes by the minuscule Holopaw State Forest. This forest is overshadowed by much larger wildlife management areas across the road such as the Triple N Ranch Wildlife Management Area, and later the Herky Huffman/Bull Creek Wildlife Management Area, the latter of which surrounds the community of Bull Creek, Florida. Past these two preserved lands, the routes run through Deer Park, Florida, where it passes by the southern terminus of CR 419, a Florida Forestry Service tower, and a Florida Power and Lighting Power Line right-of-way. Additionally, the name of the road becomes "Space Coast Parkway," despite being too far southwest of Florida's Space Coast.

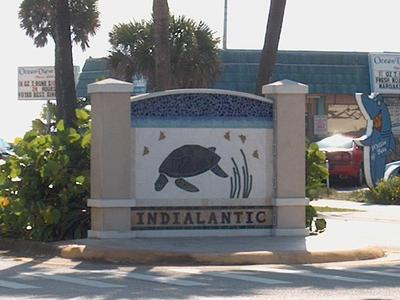
SR 500's east end at SR A1A in Indialantic.

Following an intersection with a dirt road leading to an antenna tower, US 192 and SR 500 finally crosses the Osceola-Brevard County Line. The rest of the scenery remains rural, consisting of ranchland and swampland. The main reason for the abundance of preserved land is encountered at the bridges over the St. Johns River. The last preserved area along this segment is the Three Forks Conservation Area North Trailhead. As it enters West Melbourne US 192/SR 500 becomes New Haven Avenue just before the interchange with Interstate 95 at exit 180 then intersects Brevard CR 511, but only northbound. At City Acres Drive, the routes leave West Melbourne to enter June Park only to re-enter West Melbourne again at Feast Road just before intersecting with crosses CR 509 (Minton Road and South Wickham Road). The routes briefly runs along the southern border of Melbourne Village and then next major intersection is with Evans Boulevard, which leads to Florida State Road 508 and the Melbourne Orlando International Airport. US 192 and SR 500 officially enter Melbourne at Dairy Road. East of that point it runs along the north side of the Melbourne Golf and Country Club and contains a bridge over Crane Creek which also runs through the golf course. Soon after the intersection with State Road 507, the routes cut northeast to Strawbridge Avenue, which runs one block north of New Haven Avenue, providing a bypass of the Historic Downtown Melbourne. Along with many west-east streets in this part of the city US 192/SR 500 takes a slight northeast turn at the crossing of the Florida East Coast Railway main line one block before the intersection with US 1 which is a block north of the historic 1900 Building. Strawbridge Avenue and New Haven Avenue merge at the west end of the Melbourne Causeway, which passes over the Indian River to Indialantic. US 192 and Florida State Road 500 both run along Fifth Avenue, where it spends five blocks before finally ending at State Road A1A, one short block from the Atlantic Ocean.

== Major intersections ==
County	Location	mi	km	Destinations	Notes
Brevard	Indialantic	0.000	0.000	SR A1A (Miramar Avenue) – Melbourne Beach	
see US 192 (mile 74.746-18.123), US 441 (mile 229.899-320.451), US 27 (mile 295.480-319.602)
Levy	Williston	171.297	275.676	US 27 north / US 41 north / SR 121 north (North Main Street / SR 45) – Archer, Gainesville	north end of US 27 overlap; south end of US 27 Alt. / US 41 / SR 45 / SR 121 overlap
Levy	see US 27 Alt. (mile 0.000-26.652)				
Levy	Chiefland	197.949	318.568	US 19 / US 98 / US 27 Alt. north (SR 55) – Inglis, Cedar Key, St. Petersburg, Fanning Springs	
1.000 mi = 1.609 km; 1.000 km = 0.621 mi: Concurrency terminus

== Related route ==
State Road 500A
- Location: Tavares
- Length: 0.27 mi (430 m)

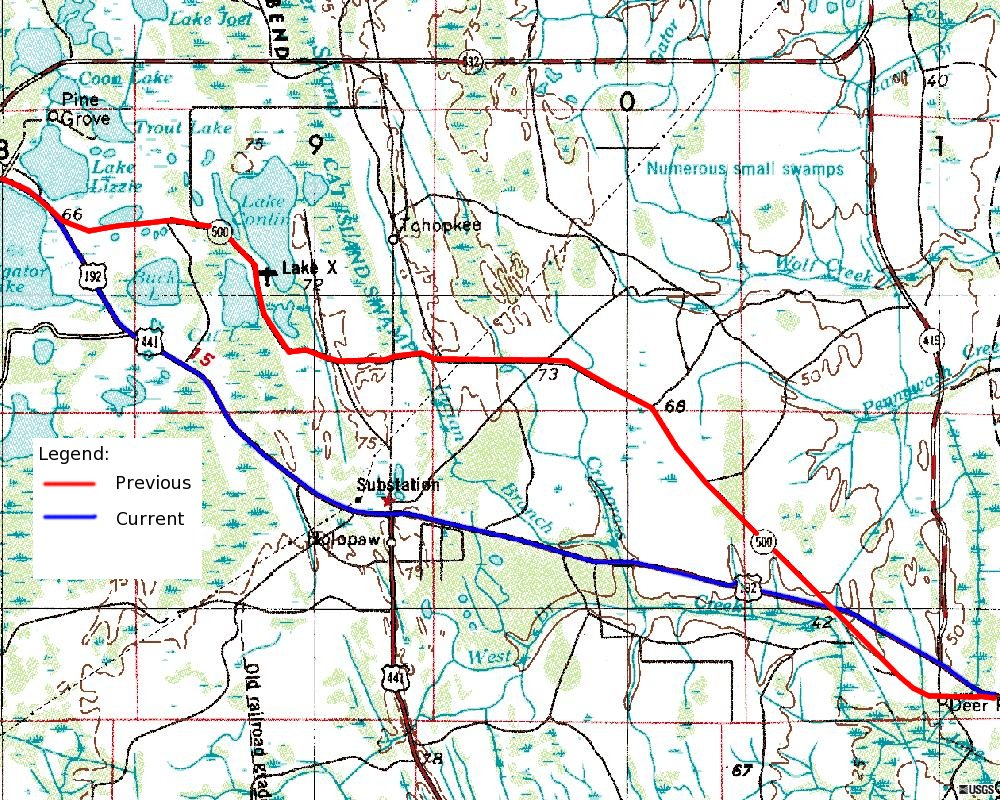
A former alignment of US 192 that was once part of SR 500 (red).

State Road 500A (SR 500A) is a short signed state highway in Tavares, in Lake County, Florida, connecting US 441 (SR 500) with SR 19. Other alignments have existed, including Lake County's CR Old 441, CR 500A in Orange County, between SR 19 and US 441 through Tavares, Eustis and Mount Dora; and a former section of US 192 in eastern Osceola County. Old USGS maps show the abandoned section of the Kissimmee Highway between Lake Conlin (also known as Lake X) and Deer Park having been SR 500A at some point.
