= Florida State Road 534 =

Toll road in Florida

State Road 534

Route information
- Maintained by FDOT
- Status: Planned

Major junctions
- West end: SR 417 in Orlando
- CR 15 near Orlando
- East end: CR 532 near St. Cloud

Location
- Country: United States
- State: Florida
- Counties: Orange, Osceola

Highway system
- Florida State Highway System; Interstate; US; State; Former; Pre‑1945; Toll; Scenic
← SR 533	→ SR 535

State Road 534 (SR 534) is a planned 14-mile (23 km), limited-access toll road intended to meet the increasing demand for additional east–west connectivity southeast of Orlando International Airport in the US state of Florida. Once completed, the road is expected to primarily serve residents and businesses in southeast Orange and northeast Osceola counties.

The Central Florida Expressway Authority is in various stages of development of the corridor, which extends from SR 417 near Boggy Creek Road in Orange County to Nova Road in Osceola County. Various sections are under design to enhance mobility for the area's fast-growing population and economy, improve connectivity to Orlando International Airport and relieve congestion on local roads such as Narcoossee Road and Boggy Creek Road.

The tolled expressway will be built in three phases. Once the project is complete, SR 534 will include seven interchanges, more than 30 mainline bridges and a design with several roundabouts to maintain free traffic flow.
