= U.S. Route 192 =

Highway in Florida

U.S. Highway 192
- US 192 highlighted in red

Route information
- Auxiliary route of US 92
- Maintained by FDOT
- Length: 74.746 mi (120.292 km)
- Existed: 1926–present

Major junctions
- West end: US 27 in Four Corners
- I-4 near Celebration; US 17 / US 92 / US 441 in Kissimmee; Florida's Turnpike near St. Cloud; I-95 in West Melbourne; US 1 in Melbourne
- East end: SR A1A in Indialantic

Location
- Country: United States
- State: Florida
- Counties: Polk, Lake, Orange, Osceola, Brevard

Highway system
- United States Numbered Highway System; List; Special; Divided; Florida State Highway System; Interstate; US; State; Former; Pre‑1945; Toll; Scenic
← SR 190	→ I-195
← SR 528	SR 530	→ SR 533

U.S. Route 192 (US 192) is an east–west route of the United States Numbered Highway system in central Florida. It runs 75.04 miles (120.77 km) from U.S. Route 27 (State Road 25) in Four Corners, Lake County, east past Walt Disney World and through Kissimmee, St. Cloud and Melbourne, to end at State Road A1A in Indialantic, one block from the Atlantic Ocean. It crosses (and runs concurrent with) its "parent", U.S. Route 92, in Kissimmee, for only 3,700 feet (1,100 m).

The U.S. Route is assigned the following unsigned State Road numbers:

- The full length of State Road 530, 18.41 miles (29.63 km) from US 27 (SR 25) to Main Street in Kissimmee
- The southernmost part of State Road 500, 56.62 miles (91.12 km) from Kissimmee to Indialantic

US 192 is a major tourist strip in the area around the Walt Disney World Resort and features numerous timeshare and other resorts; the road includes "mile markers" (though not strictly placed at the exact mile intervals) to help tourists locate businesses. In the late 1990s, the Osceola Parkway (County Road 522) opened, providing a tolled alternate between Walt Disney World and Kissimmee.

For most of its route, US 192 is the Irlo Bronson Memorial Highway, named after former state representative, senator and cattleman Irlo O. Bronson, Sr. It is also known as Space Coast Parkway, as it leads to the Space Coast.

== Route description ==
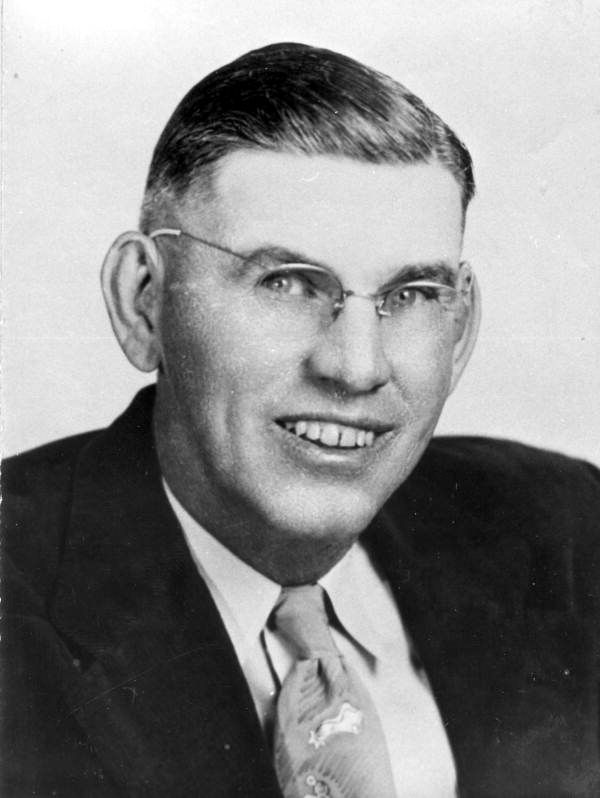
Irlo Bronson

A US 192 shield used in Florida prior to 1993

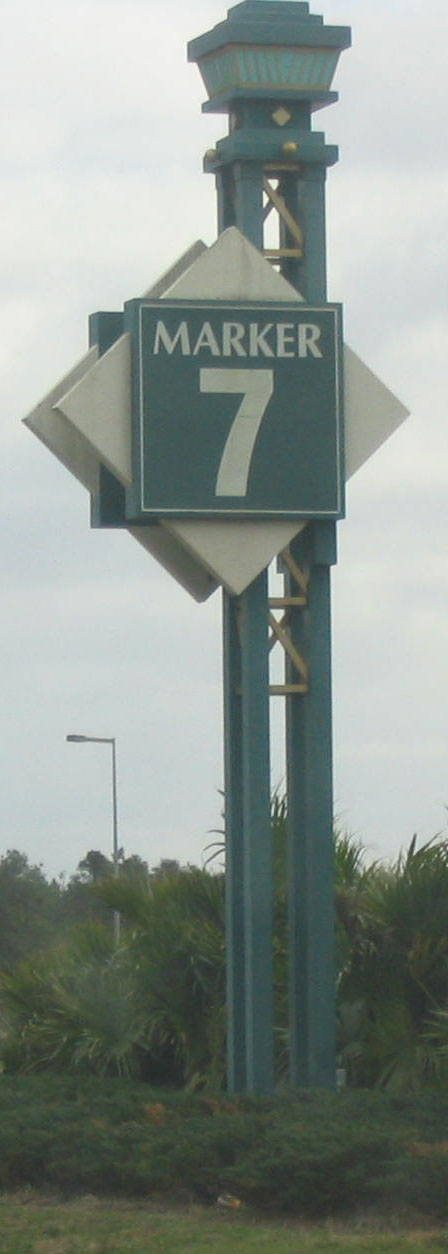
One of the "mile markers" on US 192

US 192 (SR 530) begins at a trumpet interchange on U.S. Route 27 (State Road 25) in Lake County, just north of the Polk County line. (Three of the four ramps enter Polk County.) It heads east as a four-to-six lane divided highway, crossing into Orange County (just north of Osceola County) after about a mile (1.5 km). Soon after entering Orange County, County Road 545 heads north, serving the far western areas of the county. An old alignment of US 192 (Bali Boulevard) is present to the north between the county line and CR 545; it used to continue east to the south (in Osceola County) to near Lindfields Boulevard.

After spending under two miles (3.2 km) in Orange County, US 192 crosses the line into Osceola County, continuing to parallel it. It intersects with State Road 429 (opened to the north in late 2005 and to the south in late 2006) before curving southeast away from the county line. In that area, the density of tourist attractions increases as the road approaches Walt Disney World. An old alignment (Black Lake Road) is present on the north side between the curve away from the county line and Sherberth Road, near where it curves back east. Sherberth Road is the westernmost public access to Walt Disney World, intersecting the Osceola Parkway west of Disney's Animal Kingdom. Just east of it is an intersection with County Road 545, which heads south.

Near the crossing of Reedy Creek, US 192 enters the Reedy Creek Improvement District (Walt Disney World), although the highway remains under state ownership, unlike other roads in the RCID. Both sides of the road are owned by Disney and kept empty, so US 192 has a short freeway section through Walt Disney World. An interchange provides access to World Drive, the main north–south road in Walt Disney World, and then US 192 crosses Interstate 4 (State Road 400), the end of Disney property. The north side again is filled with tourist attractions, while the south side is at first part of Celebration, Disney's planned community.

Celebration Avenue heads south to an interchange with State Road 417, which crosses US 192 with no direct access. Just east of that crossing, US 192 crosses Bonnet Creek, the east end of Celebration, and International Drive heads north. An intersection with Poinciana Boulevard provides access to the Osceola Parkway to the north and Poinciana to the south, and State Road 535 heads north soon after. SR 535, and US 192 to the east, is part of the old Kissimmee-Vineland Road, built parallel to the Florida Midland Railroad; the intersection of US 192 and SR 535 has been moved to give US 192 the through road.

Just after crossing SR 535, US 192 turns southeast onto the alignment of the old Kissimmee-Vineland Road. Another old alignment - Old Vineland Road - is present in this section, rejoining as US 192 turns back east towards downtown Kissimmee. After the road crosses Shingle Creek, it becomes Kissimmee's Vine Street, a major east–west road passing north of downtown. Close to downtown, US 192 crosses John Young Parkway. This is a major north–south road from Kissimmee north to Orlando, built as an alternate to the Orange Blossom Trail. To the south, since ca. 2000, John Young Parkway carries U.S. Route 17/92 (State Road 600) southwest out of Kissimmee. US 17, US 92 and SR 600 run concurrent with US 192 and SR 530 for 3/4 mile (1.2 km) to Main Street, which heads south into downtown Kissimmee and north to Orlando as the Orange Blossom Trail. This carries US 17, US 92 and SR 600 to the north, and carried them south until ca. 2000. Also to the north on Main Street is U.S. Route 441 (State Road 500); both of these routes turn east with US 192 out of Kissimmee. SR 530 ends at the intersection of Vine Street and Main Street; thus Vine Street carries US 192, US 441 and SR 500 east from Kissimmee.

Several miles from downtown Kissimmee, US 192 turns southeast. The road intersects Fortune Road (formerly Boggy Creek Road) before an interchange with Florida's Turnpike (State Road 91). This interchange, consisting of a connector road between US 192 and a trumpet interchange at the Turnpike, once served all movements. A new northbound offramp was built several miles to the east, where US 192 crosses the Turnpike, when the Turnpike north of SR 60 changed from a ticket system to a barrier toll system.

After crossing the Turnpike, US 192 turns back east, becoming 13th Street in St. Cloud. The original alignment (part of the Kissimmee-Melbourne Highway) between Kissimmee and St. Cloud, which paralleled the St. Cloud and Sugar Belt Railway, began at Main Street and Drury Avenue in downtown Kissimmee, heading east on Drury Avenue and Neptune Road, crossing US 192 west of downtown St. Cloud and becoming 10th Street. In St. Cloud, County Road 523 heads south at Vermont Avenue. After leaving St. Cloud, at the unincorporated community of Ashton, County Road 15 (Narcoossee Road) heads north past Narcoossee and into Orange County. Unsigned State Road 15 begins at that intersection, heading east with US 192, US 441 and SR 500. 10th Street (the old alignment) ends at CR 15 north of US 192, but the road used to continue across, turning southeast to hit US 192 east of CR 15.

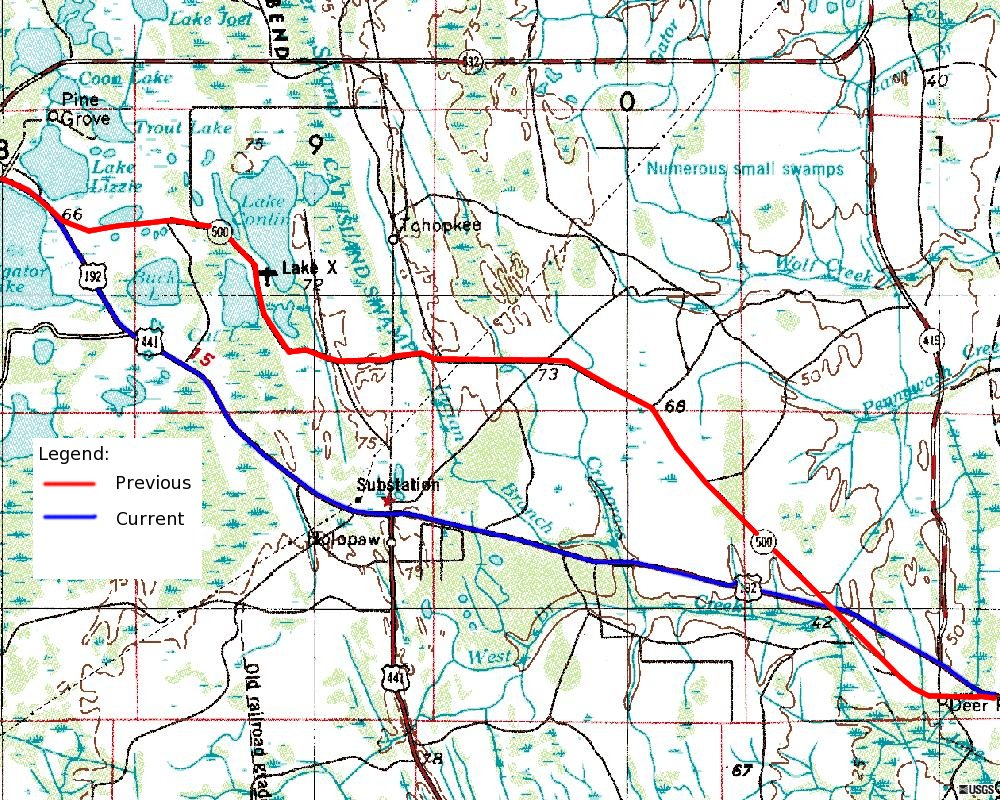
US 192 (blue) and Old Melbourne Highway (red) in eastern Osceola County.

Leaving the St. Cloud area, US 192 again begins to turn southeast, running mainly through swampland for the rest of its path to Melbourne. Another old alignment - Lake Lizzie Drive - begins there, running north of US 192 to its end just west of Alligator Creek. County Road 532 (Nova Road) splits off to the northeast in that area, crossing Lake Lizzle Drive and then turning east. After the Alligator Creek crossing, yet another old alignment - Old Melbourne Highway, former State Road 500A - splits to the east. Portions of this road have been closed to the public, as the old road runs past Mercury Marine's former Lake X landing strip. The rest of the alignment is on private property owned mostly by Deseret Ranch.

At Holopaw, around the middle of the old alignment, U.S. Route 441 and State Road 15 split off to the south, leaving only US 192 and SR 500 beyond to Melbourne. West of Deer Park, the old road crosses to the south side of the new road. Several miles later, at Deer Park, County Road 419 begins to the north; the road to the south is unnumbered and ends at old US 192. From there, the old alignment heads straight east back to the current road, passing the Kempfer Sawmill and the former Union Cypress Railroad.

Soon after the old and new alignments join, US 192 crosses into Brevard County on the original Kissimmee-Melbourne Highway, roughly paralleling the old Union Cypress Railroad. As it approaches Melbourne on New Haven Avenue, it crosses Interstate 95 (State Road 9), intersects County Road 511 (north only), crosses County Road 509, and intersects State Road 507. Soon after SR 507, US 192 cuts northeast to Strawbridge Avenue, which runs one block north of New Haven Avenue, providing a bypass of the Historic Downtown Melbourne. After crossing U.S. Route 1 (State Road 5) at the site of the historic 1900 Building, Strawbridge Avenue and New Haven Avenue merge at the west end of the Melbourne Causeway across the Indian River. New Haven Avenue is still maintained by the state east of US 1, and is considered a section of SR 500. East of the Indian River, US 192 enters Indialantic on Fifth Avenue, where it spends four blocks before ending at State Road A1A, one short block from the Atlantic Ocean.

== History ==
Florida's State Road system was defined by law in 1923. Included in that system was State Road 24, running along the existing Kissimmee-Melbourne Highway from State Road 2 in Kissimmee to State Road 4 in Melbourne. This road had been built in 1918 through the land of George W. Hopkins. In the mid-1920s, SR 24 became part of the Dixie Highway, connecting the western route in Kissimmee with the eastern route in Melbourne.

The United States Numbered Highways were assigned in late 1926, including U.S. Route 192, running from U.S. Route 92 in Kissimmee east to U.S. Route 1 in Melbourne. In the 1930s, several sections in Osceola County were realigned.

In 1931, another State Road - State Road 257 - was defined. This route would begin in Kissimmee, heading northwest on the Kissimmee-Vineland Road and west on the Kissimmee-Lake Wilson Road, and then make its way generally north to Clermont and Howey-in-the-Hills. (This follows the existing US 192 from Kissimmee to the curve just west of Walt Disney World; the road was never built beyond the west end of Oak Island Road.)

SR 24 was extended east in 1933 to State Road 140 (now State Road A1A) at the Atlantic Ocean, but US 192 did not join it. In 1935, SR 24 was extended the other way, from Kissimmee northwest along the Kissimmee-Vineland Road and beyond, ending in Mount Plymouth. (This overlapped with the beginning of SR 257, and only coincided with present US 192 there.)

In the 1945 renumbering, three State Roads were assigned to what is now US 192. From Kissimmee to Melbourne, still the only part of US 192 at the time, SR 24 became part of State Road 500. The 1933 extension of SR 24 to the Atlantic Ocean became the short State Road 516. Finally, State Road 530 was assigned along former SR 24 and SR 257 from Kissimmee west to the end of Oak Island Road, turning south there along Goodman Road and Old Lake Wilson Road to Loughman, continuing east on Loughman Road to end at State Road 600 (U.S. Highway 17/92).

On July 13, 1950, a newly constructed road, running west from the south end of State Road 545 to U.S. Route 27 (State Road 25), was assigned the number State Road 545A. This soon became part of SR 530, which was rerouted to its present alignment.

In the late 1960s, US 192 was extended east along SR 516 (renumbered at some point to an extension of SR 500) to end at State Road A1A In 1972 it was extended west along SR 530 to U.S. Route 27 (State Road 25), crossing Interstate 4 and the recently opened Walt Disney World Resort along the way.

US 192 underwent extensive reconstruction in the 1990s, which continues to the present date. The widening of the portion from SR 535 to Interstate 4 to six lanes went several years behind schedule because of unanticipated drainage complications. Construction to widen US 192 to four lanes from east of St. Cloud to I-95, eliminating the remaining 2-lane section, was completed in 2008. The rebuilt intersection with I-4 was fully opened in July 2007.

== Major intersections ==
County	Location	mi	km	Destinations	Notes
Lake–Polk county line	Four Corners	0.000	0.000	US 27 (SR 25) to Florida's Turnpike north – Haines City, Clermont	interchange
Orange	Four Corners	1.547	2.490	CR 545 north (Avalon Road) – Winter Garden	
Osceola	Four Corners	3.50	5.63	SR 429 – Apopka, Tampa	SR 429 exit 6
Osceola	Four Corners	5.599	9.011	CR 545 south (Old Lake Wilson Road)	
Osceola	Celebration	6.256	10.068	Griffin Road	
Osceola	Celebration	6.79	10.93	Celebration (World Drive south)	interchange; westbound exit and eastbound entrance
Osceola	Celebration	6.79	10.93	Walt Disney World Resort: Magic Kingdom, Epcot, Hollywood Studios (World Drive north)	interchange
Osceola	Celebration	8.16	13.13	I-4 (SR 400) – Orlando, Tampa, St. Petersburg	I-4 exit 64
Osceola	Celebration	9.235	14.862	To SR 417 / Celebration Avenue – Celebration, International Airport	SR 417 exit 2
Osceola		9.665	15.554	International Drive to CR 522 (Osceola Parkway)	
Osceola		11.574	18.627	Poinciana Boulevard to CR 522 (Osceola Parkway)	
Osceola		12.179	19.600	SR 535 north (Vineland Road) to CR 522 (Osceola Parkway) – Epcot, International Airport	
Osceola	Kissimmee	17.372	27.958	US 17 south / US 92 west / US 17 Truck north / US 92 Truck east (John Young Parkway / SR 600 west) to CR 522 (Osceola Parkway)	west end of US 17 / US 92 / SR 600 overlap
Osceola	Kissimmee	18.123	29.166	US 17 north / US 92 east / US 441 north (Main Street / SR 500 north / SR 600 west) to CR 522 (Osceola Parkway) – Downtown Kissimmee, Haines City, Orlando, Amtrak	east end of SR 530; east end of US 17 / US 92 / SR 600 overlap; west end of US 441 / SR 500 overlap
Osceola	Kissimmee	19.953	32.111	Fortune Road (CR 530 east) - Buenaventura Lakes	formerly Boggy Creek Road
Osceola	St. Cloud	21.784	35.058	Florida's Turnpike (SR 91) – Miami	Turnpike exits 242 and 244
Osceola	St. Cloud	22.394	36.040	Partin Settlement Road (CR 523)	
Osceola	St. Cloud	26.434	42.541	CR 523 south (Vermont Avenue) / to Canoe Creek Road	
Osceola	St. Cloud	29.400	47.315	CR 15 north (Narcoossee Road) / Hickory Tree Road (CR 534) – Narcoossee, Orlando	west end of SR 15 overlap
Osceola		30.679	49.373	CR 532 east (Nova Road) – Cocoa	
Osceola		33.315	53.615	Old Melbourne Highway (CR 500A east)	
Osceola		35.925	57.816	Hickory Tree Road (CR 534 west)	
Osceola	Holopaw	42.586	68.536	US 441 south (Holopaw Road / SR 15 south) / Turn Around Bay Road	east end of US 441 / SR 15 overlap
Osceola	Deer Park	53.962	86.843	CR 419 north (Deer Park Road)	
Brevard				Bridge over the St. Johns River	
Brevard	West Melbourne	66.11	106.39	I-95 (SR 9) – Jacksonville, Miami	I-95 exit 180
Brevard	West Melbourne	66.441	106.926	John Rodes Boulevard (CR 511)	
Brevard	West Melbourne	68.128	109.641	CR 509 (Wickham Road / Minton Road)	
Brevard	Melbourne	71.261	114.683	SR 507 south / CR 507 north (Babcock Street) – Florida Tech	
Brevard	Melbourne	72.371	116.470	US 1 (Harbor City Boulevard / SR 5)	
Brevard	Melbourne	73.2	117.8	Melbourne Causeway over Indian River	
Brevard	Indialantic	74.746	120.292	SR A1A (Miramar Avenue) – Melbourne Beach	
1.000 mi = 1.609 km; 1.000 km = 0.621 mi: Concurrency terminus
