= List of county roads in Osceola County, Florida =

- County road shields used in Florida

Highway names
- Interstates: Interstate X (I-X)
- US Highways: U.S. Highway X (US X)
- State: State Road X (SR X)
- County: County Road X (CR X)

System links
- County roads in Florida; County roads in Osceola County

The following is a list of county roads in Osceola County, Florida. All county roads are maintained by the county in which they reside.

== County routes in Osceola County ==
Route	Road Name(s)	From	To	Notes
CR 15	Narcoosee Road	US 192 / US 441	Osceola-Orange County Line	former SR 15
CR 419	Deer Park Road	US 192	CR 532	former SR 419
CR 500A	Old Melbourne Highway	US 192 / US 441 (SR 500)	dead end	former SR 500A unsigned
CR 522	Osceola Parkway	I-4	CR 530 at Orange County line	partial toll road
CR 523	Canoe Creek Road; Lake Shore Boulevard; Partin Settlement Road	US 441	CR 525	former SR 523 only signed south of US 192 / US 441
CR 523A	Lake Marian Road	dead end at Three Lakes WMA	CR 523	former SR 523A unsigned
CR 525	Tohopekaliga Drive, Kissimmee Park Road, Neptune Road, John Young Parkway	Lake Toho Resort at Kissimmee Park	Orange County line	former SR 525 unsigned
CR 525A	Lake Tohopekaliga Road	Lake Tohopekaliga	CR 525	former SR 525A unsigned
CR 527	Old Dixie Highway; Orange Avenue	US 17 / US 92 / US 441	Osceola-Orange County Line	former SR 527 unsigned
CR 530	Boggy Creek Road; Narcoosee Road; Jack Brack Road	US 192 / US 441	West of Bullock Lake	former SR 530 unsigned
CR 530A	Lake Cecile Drive	dead end	US 192	former SR 530A unsigned
CR 530A	Hilliard Isle Road	CR 530	dead end at East Lake Tohopekaliga, Hilliard Island	former SR 530A unsigned
CR 531	Pleasant Hill Road; Clay Street; Michigan Avenue	CR 580	CR 522	former SR 531 unsigned
CR 531A	Thacker Avenue; Donegan Avenue	CR 531	US 17 / US 92 / US 441	former SR 531A unsigned
CR 532	Polk-Osceola County Line Road	I-4	US 17 / US 92	former SR 532
CR 532	Nova Road	US 192 / US 441	Osceola-Orange County Line	former SR 532
CR 534	10th Street; Hickory Tree Road	CR 525	US 192 / US 441	former SR 534 unsigned
CR 534A	Lake Gentry Road	dead end at Lake Gentry	CR 534	former SR 534A unsigned
CR 534A	Alligator Lake Road	CR 534	dead end at Alligator Lake	former SR 534A unsigned
CR 534A	Pine Grove Road	US 192 / US 441	CR 532	former SR 534A unsigned
CR 534A	Jones Road	CR 534	dead end	former SR 534A unsigned
CR 535	Ham Brown Road	Reaves Road	US 17 / US 192	former SR 535 unsigned
CR 545	Old Lake Wilson Road	CR 532	US 192	former SR 545
CR 580	Cypress Parkway	Osceola-Polk County Line	CR 531	former SR 580
