= Holopaw State Forest =

Forest in Florida

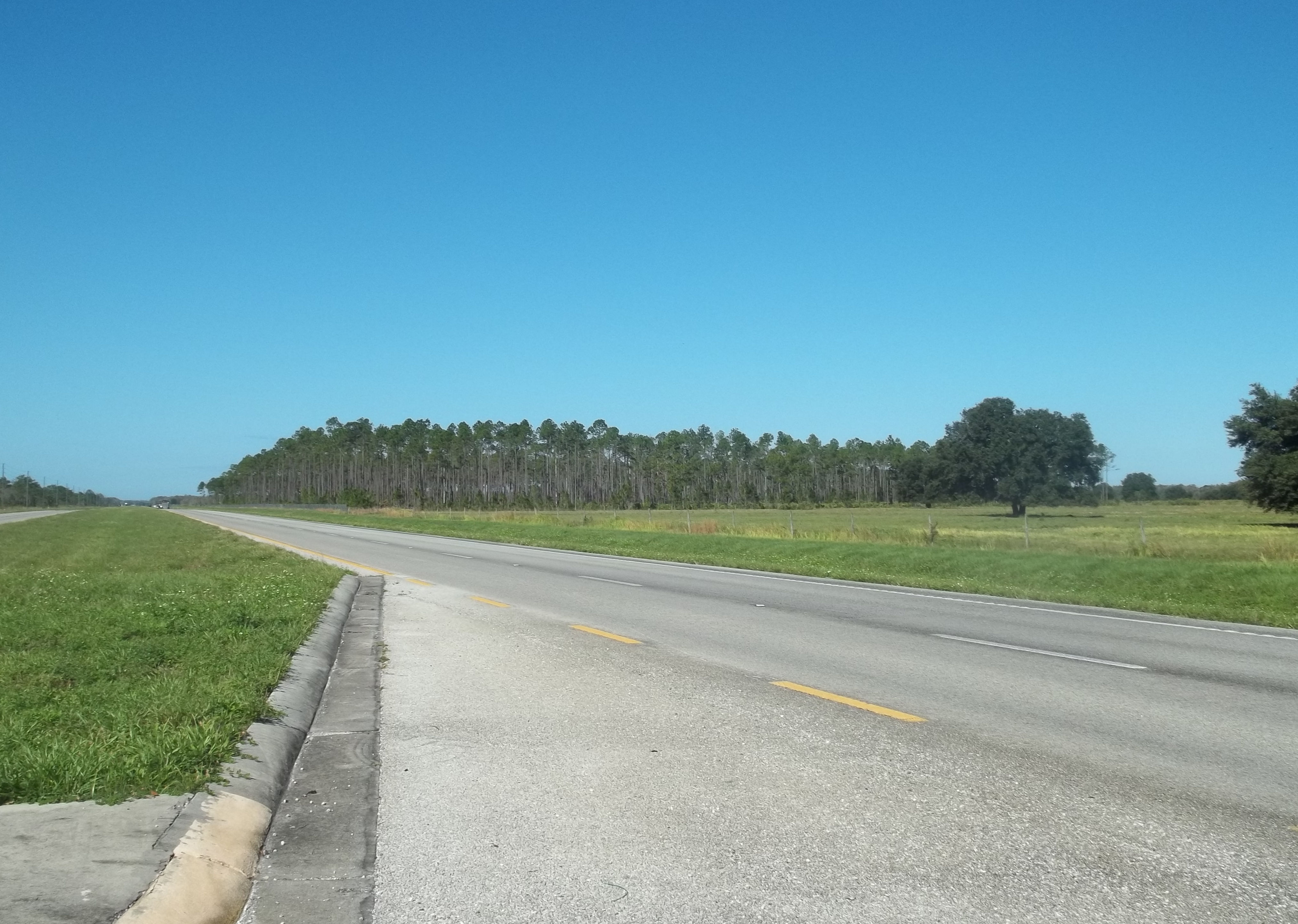
- US 192 within the forest, as seen from the median.

- Location within Florida
- Location: Osceola County, Florida
- Nearest city: Holopaw, Florida
- Coordinates: 28°08′21″N 81°02′13″W
- Area: 58 acres (0.23 km^{2})
- Established: 1961
- Governing body: Florida Department of Environmental Protection

The Holopaw State Forest is in the U.S. state of Florida. The 58-acre (0.23 km2) forest is located off U.S. Route 192 in Central Florida, within the unincorporated town of Holopaw, Florida in Osceola County, Florida.

The forest is located south of the "Indian Branch" of Crabgrass Creek, a tributary of the Upper Basin of the St. Johns River. Due to its small size, access to the forest is only available through a permit issued by the Division of Forestry's field office in Orlando. The forest is also dwarfed by the much larger Triple N Ranch Wildlife Management Area.

== See also ==
- List of Florida state forests
- List of Florida state parks
