= Shingle Creek (Florida) =

River in Orange County, Florida, US

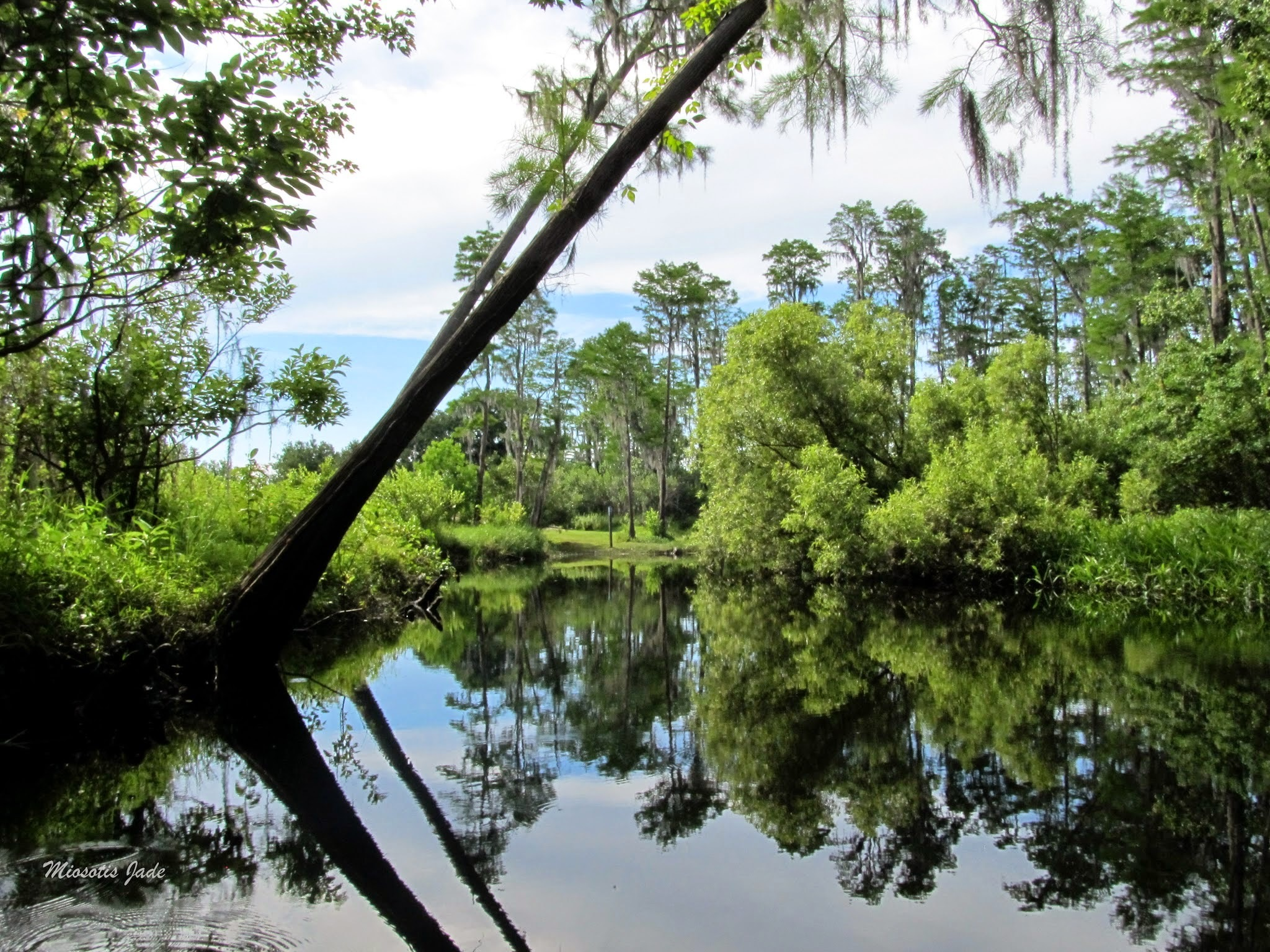
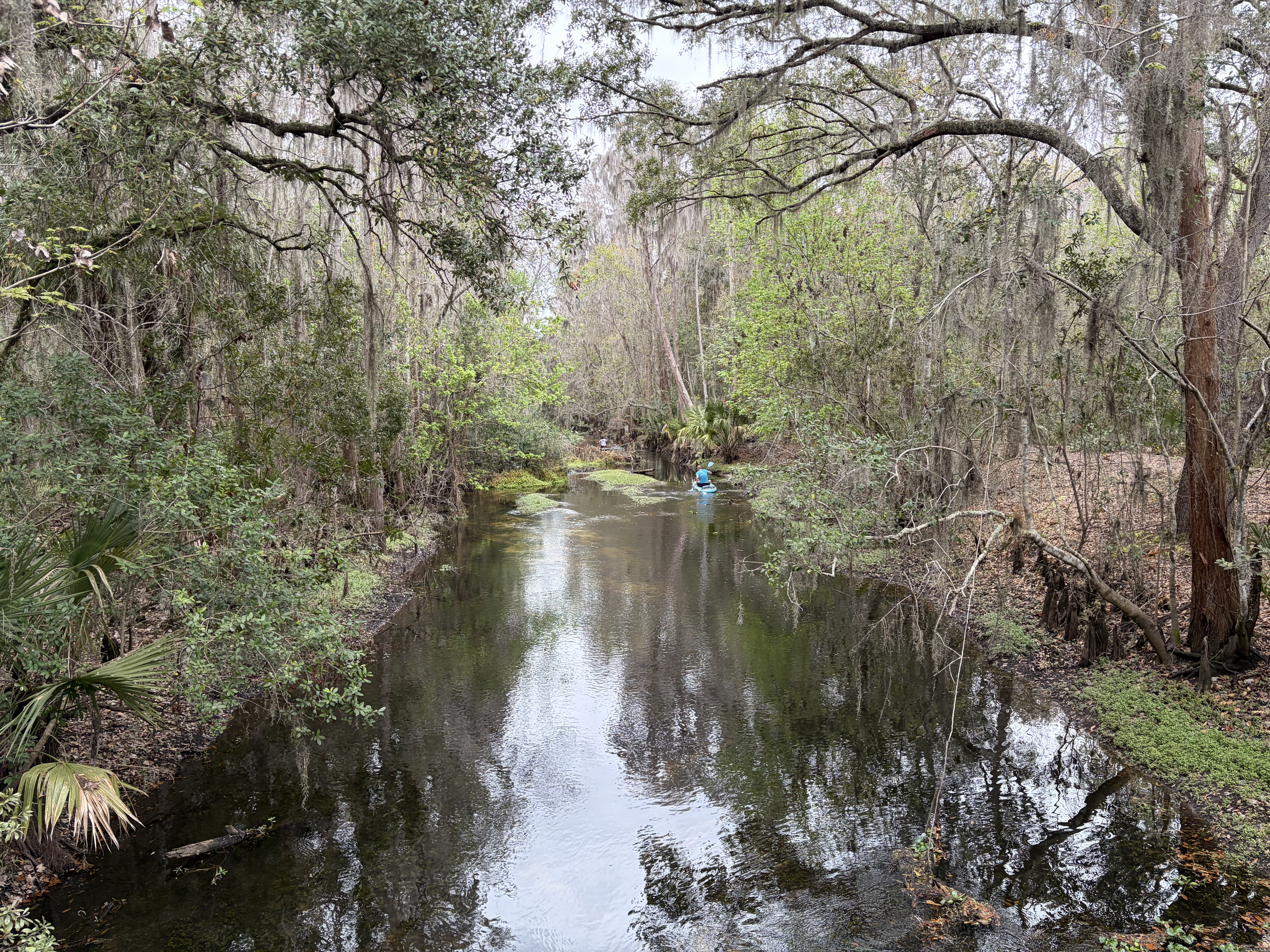
- Shingle Creek Regional Park in Kissimmee, Florida Shingle Creek Management Area in Orange County, Florida
- Course of Shingle Creek

Location
- Country: United States
- State: Florida
- Counties: Orange, Osceola

Physical characteristics
- Mouth: Lake Tohopekaliga
  - location: Kissimmee, Osceola County
  - coordinates: 28°16′00″N 81°24′27″W
- Length: 23.3 mi (37.5 km)
- Basin size: 180 sq mi (470 km^{2})

Shingle Creek is a small waterway in central Florida that is generally considered to be the northernmost headwaters of the Everglades watershed. It is named after the cypress trees that lined the bank in the late 19th century, which were used to make wood shingles. The stream and surrounding wetlands are part of ongoing preservation efforts.

The creek begins in southern Orange County, a few miles east of International Drive, and west of John Young Parkway. From there, it flows south under the Beachline Expressway, State Road 417, and Osceola Parkway to Kissimmee in Osceola County. It then turns directly east and flows into Lake Tohopekaliga, contributing to the Kissimmee River system which continues into south Florida and the Everglades.

Several places in the area derive their names from Shingle Creek, including resort and convention hotel Rosen Shingle Creek, the Shingle Creek Golf Club, and Shingle Creek Elementary School.

== Conservation ==
=== Save Our Rivers ===
The Save Our Rivers program, formally the Water Management Lands Trust Fund, was established by the Florida Legislature in 1981 to enable the state's water management districts to acquire conservation lands for water management, supply, and protection.

In 1985, Shingle Creek was added to the Save Our Rivers acquisition list. The acquisition was proposed by the staff of the South Florida Water Management District (SFWMD). The cypress wetland was identified as a detention area during flood conditions and an opportunity to restore historic water flow to improve environmental conditions and water quality along the creek. The site was also noted for its recreational potential, with the SFWMD noting that canoeing along the creek was a popular pastime.

The swamp itself covered approximately 700 acres (280 ha) of largely undisturbed cypress wetland, bisected by powerline easements and connected to a largely channelized creek. In 1986, the proposed acquisition spanned approximately 1,000 acres (400 ha) between Orange and Osceola counties, with an estimated value around $1.5 million. By 1987, the District had committed to pursuing Shingle Creek as part of its Corps obligations, with a projected acquisition cost of $1.75 million and plans to begin acquisition that year.

=== Tuscana proposal ===
The Tuscana proposal is a large-scale planned development project targeting approximately 227 acres (92 ha) of land in the Shingle Creek watershed, located east of International Drive and south of Central Florida Parkway. The rezoning application plans to convert land designated as agricultural/rural to a planned development district, with plans for over 4,800 multi-family dwelling units, nearly 1,300 hotel rooms, and roughly 650,000 square feet of commercial space. The site sits adjacent to the largest remaining wetland complex along the Shingle Creek system.

The application was first filed in January 2022 and underwent significant revision over the following three years. The original proposal called for 87 acres (35 ha) of direct wetland impacts, but the figure had been reduced to approximately 22 acres (8.9 ha) by 2025. Developers also removed a total of 770 hotel and multi-family units from the proposal over the course of negotiations, and reduced proposed wetland impacts by roughly 60 acres (24 ha). The development team, which included engineering firm Kimley-Horn and environmental consultants Bio-Tech Consulting, proposed preserving over 150 acres (61 ha) of wetlands and clustering taller buildings, some reaching 150 feet, in order to minimize the overall footprint.

Environmental researcher John Capece, who leads Kissimmee Water Keeper, stated that constraining the floodplain would enhance flooding in surrounding areas. A 2022 study he contributed to for the South Florida Water Management District projected extreme rainfall events in the region would increase by roughly 60 percent between 2020 and 2059. Orange County Public Works Deputy Director Susan Van Ussach noted that when Shingle Creek stages high, there is nowhere for floodwaters to go except the area slated for construction.

Additionally, the county's Environmental Protection Division documented bald eagles, black bears, and at least three rare or imperiled bat species within the creek basin. A technical study commissioned by Orange County identified 64 wildlife species of concern living in the Shingle Creek watershed.

Proponents of the project, including the development team and a group of approximately 176 private landowners organized as Shingle Creek Co-Owners LLC, contended that consolidating development onto one portion of the Munger tract would actually benefit conservation by enabling the preservation of surrounding land. Tuscana project manager Dan DeLisi said that many of the privately held parcels within the Munger tract are non-contiguous and unmanageable for preservation purposes, stating: "Because this private development group was able to get together and, as one, do a consolidation of interests, it makes it a whole lot easier for the public sector to then acquire land within this plat and then preserve it". The development team also maintained that their stormwater modeling showed the project would not worsen off-site flooding and would in fact improve existing conditions. Several landowners argued they had purchased parcels in good faith based on the area's high-density future land use designations.

The Development Review Committee voted 3-2 against recommending approval on April 2, 2025, citing unresolved concerns from the Environmental Protection Division. The Planning and Zoning Commission voted unanimously against the project on April 24, 2025. The Board of County Commissioners voted unanimously to deny the project on May 20, 2025, after receiving more than 1,000 emails urging denial.

In September 2026, following a challenge filed by the developers under the Florida Land Use and Environmental Dispute Resolution Act (FLUEDRA), Special Magistrate Igmedio E. Pantaleon recommended that the county approve the project. The developers had also notified the county of their intent to bring a claim under the Bert Harris Act, alleging losses of more than $112 million. On September 29, 2026, the Board of County Commissioners voted 4–3 to accept the magistrate's recommendations and approve the Tuscana land use plan, reversing its unanimous denial of May 2025.

=== Special Protection Area ===
The Shingle Creek Special Protection Area (SPA) process is an ongoing regulatory initiative by Orange County intended to establish increased environmental and development controls over the Shingle Creek drainage basin, which spans 84 square miles in south Orange County and serves as the headwaters of the Everglades system. The basin contains 71 named lakes and ponds and drains southward, meaning land use decisions in Orange County carry downstream consequences for the broader state water system.

SPAs are designated zones identified for their significant natural features, including wetlands, habitats, and wildlife corridors, intended to ensure their long-term viability and community benefits such as clean water, flood protection, and biodiversity.

The process originated in Orange County’s updated wetlands protection ordinance, which took effect in June 2024 and identified the Shingle Creek and St. Johns River basins as vulnerable areas warranting additional study. The county subsequently commissioned technical studies of each basin, with drafts delivered to staff in March 2025, examining wetland, water, wildlife, and other natural resources that might require protections beyond existing county regulations.

Those studies documented environmental degradation over recent decades. Impervious surfaces within the basin nearly doubled from 19% in 1985 to 40% in 2020, contributing to higher surface runoff, degraded water quality, and increased downstream flooding. Approximately 94% of historic uplands within the watershed, including scrub habitats, dry prairies, and sandhills, had been lost to development by the time the study was conducted. The Florida Fish and Wildlife Conservation Commission had identified Shingle Creek as a regional biodiversity hotspot providing habitat to 135 plant and wildlife species of concern, including the Florida bonneted bat and gopher tortoise. Future land use projections indicated that without additional protections, ongoing development could impact up to 63% of the basin’s remaining uplands.

The formal process followed a phased timeline, beginning with an April 8, 2025 Board of County Commissioners (BCC) work session at which commissioners received the technical studies and provided initial policy direction. Public and advisory board stakeholder engagement was then scheduled to run from April through June 2025, with a second BCC work session on policy considerations to follow once Vision 2050, the county's new comprehensive plan, had been formally adopted.

A kickoff public meeting was held April 30 at the UF/IFAS Extension Center in Orlando, followed by a dedicated Shingle Creek SPA workshop on May 21, 2025, at Dr. Phillips Elementary School, where three critical area designation buffer options were presented. Option A proposed a buffer measured from Shingle Creek itself, Option B proposed a 200-foot buffer from directly connected wetlands, and Option C proposed a 550-foot buffer from directly connected wetlands.

The Shingle Creek SPA process was complicated by Senate Bill 180, signed into law by Governor Ron DeSantis on June 26, 2025. Originally framed as a hurricane emergency management bill, Senate Bill 180 was broadened in the final days of the legislative session to prohibit counties from proposing or adopting more restrictive or burdensome amendments to comprehensive plans or land-development regulations, with any such measures declared null and void and subject to legal challenge, with successful challengers entitled to preliminary injunctions and attorney fees and counties required to respond within 14 days of receiving a notice.

Deputy County Administrator Jon Weiss identified the two proposed SPAs as likely conflicting with Senate Bill 180 and recommended the county repeal or delay the implementation of Vision 2050. At its July 15, 2025 meeting, the Board of County Commissioners voted not to repeal Vision 2050 or related ordinances and directed staff to continue work on the Shingle Creek and St. Johns River SPA ordinances, with Mayor Jerry Demings stating he would defend the county’s home rule authority in court if necessary. As of July 2025, the Shingle Creek SPA remained in its public engagement and technical review phase.

== Recreation ==
=== Shingle Creek Trail ===
The Shingle Creek Trail is a twelve-foot-wide regional multi-use trail that runs alongside the Shingle Creek waterway, connecting parts of Orlando and Orange County through a mix of suburban and natural landscapes. It currently extends from Eagle Nest Park near the Mall at Millenia south to Sand Lake Road, where it links with the broader county trail network leading toward the Orange County Convention Center. The trail includes scenic features such as a loop around Lake Fran and wildlife overlook points.

While the full length of the trail is still being designed and constructed, the completed Shingle Creek Trail will connect with the Shingle Creek Regional Trail in Kissimmee. When complete, the trail will run 32 miles (51 km) from Wekiwa Springs State Park in Seminole County to the Kissimmee Lakefront Park.

=== Shingle Creek Regional Trail ===
The Shingle Creek Regional Trail is a trail in Osceola County running from the Kissimmee Lakefront Park by Lake Tohopekaliga to the Shingle Creek Regional Park. The trail features recreation for cyclists, pedestrians, canoeists, kayakers, and birdwatchers, with stops at Ruba Park, Steffee Landing, Babb Property, and Lancaster Ranch Park.

=== Shingle Creek Regional Park ===
Shingle Creek Regional Park is a 456-acre (185 ha) park in Osceola County, and features several old homes from the historic Shingle Creek community. The park includes fishing, hiking trails, picnicking, play area, and restrooms. The Shingle Creek Regional Trail runs through the park.

The site features several historic structures, including the Steffee Homestead, built in 1911, and the caretaker's cabin, where Henry Haines, one of the area's earliest minority residents, lived. The Pioneer Village contains a Florida cracker home dating to 1898 and a general store dating to 1900.

Within the park, Steffee Landing has a launch onto the designated paddling trail, outfitter, boardwalk and bridge. The paddling trail totals about 7 miles (11 km) from Babb Landing to Lake Tohopekaliga.

=== Shingle Creek Management Area ===
The Shingle Creek Management Area is a 1,585-acre (640 ha) recreational site located in the Hunter's Creek community in southwest Orange County. The site is regulated by the South Florida Water Management District, and features recreational areas for biking, hiking, fishing, kayaking, and canoeing. The site includes several trails, with a trailhead in the Hunter's Creek Vistas community, as well as a trailhead and canoe launch at Hunter's Creek Middle School.

== Community Development District ==
The Shingle Creek Transit and Utility Community Development District (CDD) is an independent special district established by Orange County in 2023 under Chapter 190 of the Florida Statutes. The district encompasses approximately 719 acres (291 ha) within the Shingle Creek watershed and surrounding corridor, south of Sand Lake Road and west of John Young Parkway. The district was requested by Universal Orlando to help fund public infrastructure surrounding the Epic Universe theme park.

Unlike the former Reedy Creek Improvement District, which was originally created by the Florida Legislature and directly managed by Walt Disney World with broader governmental powers, the CDD was established by the county with a narrower scope focused on infrastructure and utilities.

The district was created to finance, construct, operate, and maintain public infrastructure improvements within the area through assessments and tax-exempt bonds. District officials and Universal Orlando representatives have stated that the CDD could support transit-related infrastructure associated with the proposed Sunshine Corridor, including potential SunRail connectivity between Orlando International Airport and the Orange County Convention Center, as well as station maintenance.

Planned improvements have included drainage systems, water reclamation infrastructure, and roadway improvements. The district was projected to fund approximately $174 million in infrastructure improvements through 2029.

In 2025, the district began exploring proposals for a transportation system linking Epic Universe with other Universal Orlando properties along International Drive and near Interstate 4. In February 2026, the district voted to begin contract negotiations with The Boring Company regarding a proposed underground transit system modeled after the Vegas Loop.

== See also ==
- List of rivers of Florida
- Kissimmee-Okeechobee-Everglades watershed
