= Florida State Road 535 =

State highway in Florida, United States

State Road 535 and County Road 535
- SR 535 in red, segments of CR 535 in blue

Route information
- Maintained by FDOT and Orange County
- Length: 19.2 mi (30.9 km) 4.100 miles (6.598 km) as SR 535

Major junctions
- South end: US 192 at Celebration
- I-4 at Lake Buena Vista; SR 429 in Winter Garden
- North end: SR 50 in Winter Garden

Location
- Country: United States
- State: Florida
- County: Orange

Highway system
- Florida State Highway System; Interstate; US; State; Former; Pre‑1945; Toll; Scenic
← SR 534	→ SR 536

State Road 535 (SR 535) is a state highway in the U.S. state of Florida. The road begins at U.S. Route 192 (US 192) in Kissimmee, heading north, ending at Interstate 4 (I-4) at Lake Buena Vista. Continuing north the road becomes County Road 535 (CR 535). The road is known as Vineland Road in Osceola County and Apopka-Vineland Road in Orange County.

== Route description ==
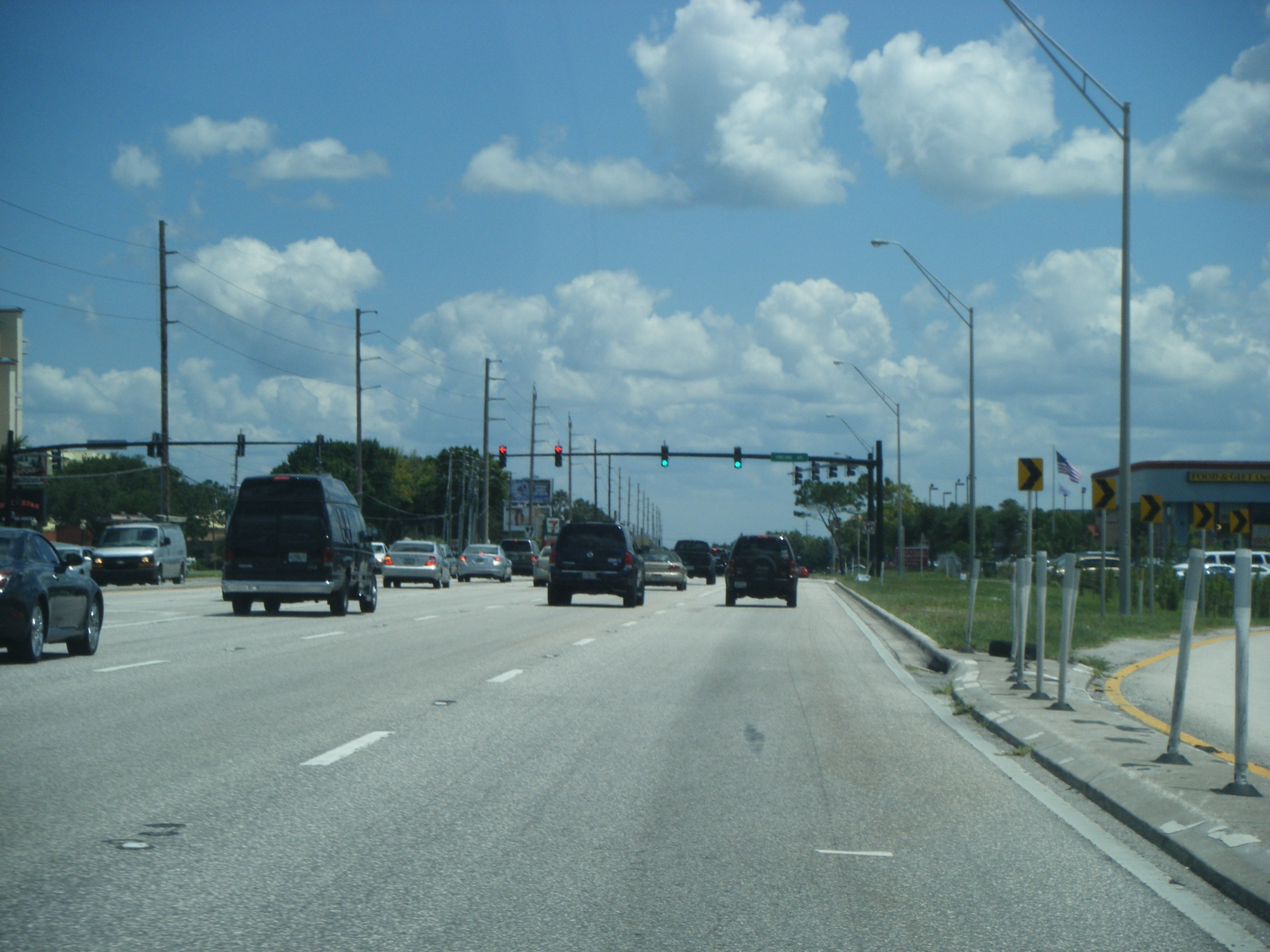
SR 535 southbound at Vineland Avenue intersection south of I-4 in Lake Buena Vista

SR 535 begins at an intersection with US 192/SR 530 in Kissimmee, Osceola County, heading north on Vineland Road, a six-lane divided highway. The road passes several businesses, curving to the northwest. The state road comes to an interchange with CR 522 (Osceola Parkway), with access to and from the eastbound direction of the Osceola Parkway. Access to and from the westbound direction is provided by North Poinciana Boulevard, which intersects SR 535 a short distance to the north. Past this, the road passes between businesses to the southwest and woods to the northeast, crossing into Lake Buena Vista in Orange County and becoming Kissimmee-Vineland Road. SR 535 heads through dense woods, passing to the west of the Lake Buena Vista Factory Stores before crossing under the SR 417 toll road without an interchange. The road intersects International Drive before reaching a junction with SR 536 in a commercial area. SR 536 heads west to provide access to the Walt Disney World Resort and east to northbound SR 417. Past this intersection, the state road passes through areas of resorts and businesses, curving to the north. SR 535 comes to an interchange with I-4/SR 400. Past this interchange, SR 535 officially ends and the road continues north as CR 535 (Apopka-Vineland Road). Despite this, SR 535 signage continues along CR 535 to an intersection with Palm Parkway/Winter Garden-Vineland Road, where CR 535 turns west onto Winter Garden-Vineland Road and CR 435 continues north along Apopka-Vineland Road.

== Major intersections ==
County	Location	mi	km	Destinations	Notes
Osceola	Celebration	0.000	0.000	US 192 to I-4	Southern terminus; road is unsigned SR 530
Osceola	Celebration	0.560	0.901	Osceola Parkway east (CR 522 east)	Interchange
Osceola	Celebration	0.704	1.133	Poinciana Boulevard CR 535 to Osceola Parkway west (CR 522 west) – Walt Disney World Resort, Poinciana	Tolled parkway
Orange	Lake Buena Vista	1.789	2.879	International Drive south	
Orange	Lake Buena Vista	2.042	3.286	SR 536 (World Center Drive) to SR 417 north – Walt Disney World Resort, Airport, Lake Buena Vista, Sea World, Convention Center	To International Drive north
Orange	Lake Buena Vista	3.54	5.70	I-4 / Vineland Avenue – Orlando, Tampa	Exit 68 on I-4 (SR 400); north end of state maintenance
Orange	Lake Buena Vista	4.1	6.6	CR 435 north (Apopka-Vineland Road) / CR 439 north (Palm Parkway) – Ocoee	Transition from SR 535 to CR 535; southern terminus of CR 435; southern terminus of CR 439
Orange	Winter Garden	16.6	26.7	SR 429 to Florida's Turnpike – Apopka, Mount Dora, Tampa	Access via frontage roads; exit 19 on SR 429 (Western Beltway)
Orange	Winter Garden	19.2	30.9	SR 50 / Colonial Drive – Brooksville, Clermont, Titusville	Northern terminus
Orange	Winter Garden	1.000 mi = 1.609 km; 1.000 km = 0.621 mi: Tolled; Route transition			
