= Holopaw, Florida =

Unincorporated community in Florida, United States

- Unincorporated community
- Location within Florida
- Coordinates: 28°8′9″N 81°4′34″W
- Country: United States
- State: Florida
- County: Osceola
- Elevation: 79 ft (24 m)
- Time zone: UTC-5
  - Summer (DST): UTC-4 (EDT)
- Area codes: 321, 407, 689

Holopaw is an unincorporated community in Osceola County, Florida, United States. It is located at the eastern end of the multiplex of highways US 192 and US 441. It has a population of fewer than 5,000 people and is part of the Orlando-Kissimmee Metropolitan Statistical Area.

Holopaw, a Creek Indian word meaning "Walkway" or "Pavement", was a stop along the Kissimmee Valley extension of the Florida East Coast Railway.

== History ==
The years 1911-1929 saw the Florida East Coast Railway building what was advertised as a second complete mainline to Miami. Known as the Kissimmee Valley Branch and heading southwest from the busy railroad town of New Smyrna Beach, the new route passed through Maytown-Pennichaw-Osceola-Geneva and was completed to Chuluota in 1912. The Chuluota-Bithlo-Holopaw-Okeechobee segment was completed in 1915. Finally wrapping around the big lake it terminated at Lake Harbor in 1929. Though it never achieved the status of 'a complete second mainline,' though it did post some impressive freight tonnage records in lumber and produce.

JM Griffin began a sawmill operation here in 1923, building streets and houses for his employees. Holopaw was a company owned town, with most employees renting their homes and frequenting the factory owned general store. The JM Griffin Lumber Company became the largest operation in the St. Cloud area, employing over 500 people. It also featured one of the first all-electric sawmills in the country. The mill lasted until 1931, closing during the Great Depression. A new mill owned by the Peavy-Wilson Lumber Co. opened in 1935, employing more than one thousand timber, turpentine, and sawmill workers. At the town's peak it had more than 2,000 people.

The railroad through Holopaw ceased operation in 1947 when a new cut-off opened between Fort Pierce and Port Mayaca. However, before it would be abandoned, the Peavy Wilson Lumber Company, operating a massive mill in Holopaw, leased the Holopaw-Pennichaw-Maytown trackage. So trains continued to roll from Holopaw northward pulled by the lumber company’s stable of steam locomotives. With greatly depleted forests, the lumber company quit in 1951 and the tracks removed soon afterwards.

Most residents left to seek employment elsewhere, and the postal service was discontinued in 1954.

== Ranching and wildlife ==
There are substantial cattle ranching, timber, and citrus operations in the area around Holopaw. The Herky Huffman/Bull Creek Wildlife Management Area is located a few miles east on US 192. West of there is the location of the Holopaw State Forest, which is across US 192 from the Triple N Ranch Wildlife Management Area.

== Climate ==
Climate data for Holopaw
Month	Jan	Feb	Mar	Apr	May	Jun	Jul	Aug	Sep	Oct	Nov	Dec	Year
Mean daily maximum °F (°C)	73 (23)	74 (23)	78 (26)	82 (28)	87 (31)	90 (32)	91 (33)	91 (33)	89 (32)	84 (29)	79 (26)	73 (23)	83 (28)
Mean daily minimum °F (°C)	47 (8)	50 (10)	52 (11)	56 (13)	61 (16)	69 (21)	71 (22)	72 (22)	71 (22)	65 (18)	56 (13)	50 (10)	60 (16)
Average precipitation inches (cm)	2 (5.1)	3 (7.6)	3 (7.6)	2 (5.1)	3 (7.6)	7 (18)	7 (18)	7 (18)	7 (18)	3 (7.6)	2 (5.1)	2 (5.1)	48 (122.8)

== See also ==
- Yeehaw Junction, Florida
- Bull Creek, Florida
