= Osceola Parkway =

Road in Florida, United States

County Road 522
- Osceola Parkway
- Osceola Parkway highlighted in red

Route information
- Maintained by Osceola County Public Works Department
- Length: 18.7 mi (30.1 km)
- Existed: June 16, 1987 (original road); August 18, 1995 (toll road)–present
- Component highways: CR 522 (east of I-4)

Major junctions
- West end: Disney's Animal Kingdom Lodge in Bay Lake
- I-4 near Celebration; SR 417 near Celebration; US 17 / US 92 / US 441 in Kissimmee; Florida's Turnpike in Kissimmee
- East end: CR 530 near Buenaventura Lakes

Location
- Country: United States
- State: Florida
- County: Osceola

Highway system
- County roads in Florida; County roads in Osceola County

Osceola Parkway, signed as County Road 522 (CR 522) since around 2003 (and originally planned as State Road 424), is a 17.5-mile-long (28.2 km), partially tolled arterial road extending east–west across the northern boundary of Osceola County, Florida, roughly paralleling the border with Orange County. It connects Walt Disney World with Interstate 4 and Florida's Turnpike before terminating at Simpson Road (formerly Boggy Creek Road) near Buenaventura Lakes, and is maintained by Osceola County. Only the section between State Road 417 and a toll plaza east of Shingle Creek is tolled; the rest includes mainly at-grade intersections. A portion of Osceola Parkway was once called Dart Boulevard.

== Route description ==
The road starts at an intersection with an entrance road to the Disney's Animal Kingdom Lodge in Lake Buena Vista. For its westernmost 0.4 miles (0.64 km), it has many characteristics of an at-grade boulevard; however, east of the entrance to Disney's Animal Kingdom, it becomes a grade-separated expressway. Heading east, the parkway passes through several sections of the Disney World Complex before intersecting with World Drive and crossing into Osceola County. The parkway exits Walt Disney World, just before an interchange with I-4. Although Osceola Parkway was built across I-4 into Walt Disney World, an interchange with that freeway (Exit 65) did not open until 2001. The ramps with the exit to nearby SR 536 are interspersed such that traffic going on to I-4 from SR 536 cannot directly exit onto Osceola Parkway, and vice versa. The road then has an interchange with SR 417 (Southern Connector), where the Parkway becomes a limited access toll road (although not a full expressway). The parkway passes through residential areas, passing through an interchange with Poinciana Blvd., featuring ramp tolls of $1.00 for eastbound exiting traffic and westbound entering traffic. East of the interchange, Osceola Parkway crosses the one mainline toll plaza just east of Shingle Creek, with a $2.00 toll as of January 2020.

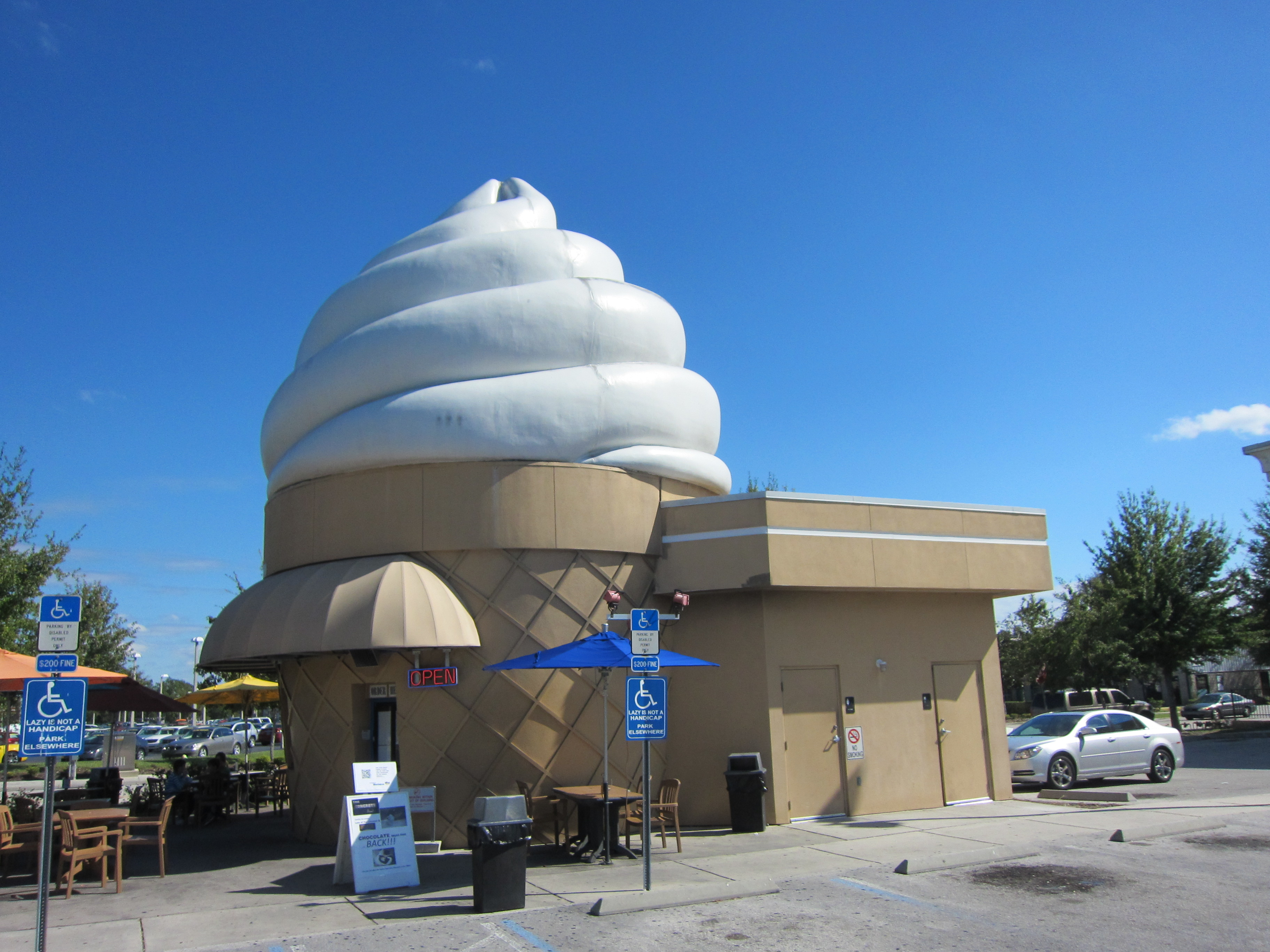
Ice cream shop on Osceola Parkway

East of the toll plaza, the tolled section of the parkway ends as it becomes a surface street, as it continues to pass through residential and shopping areas with at grade intersections, most notably with John Young Parkway and US 17/US 92/US 441 (Orange Blossom Trail) as the road heads towards Florida's Turnpike. East of the Turnpike, the road continues as a four lane street through another residential development until its terminus at Simpson Road, near Buenaventura Lakes. Simpson Road was known as Boggy Creek Road until September 2014, which removed the unusual situation of having a three way intersection with all three roads having the same name.

The Parkway, originally operated by the Osceola County Expressway Authority (OCX), originally used an electronic toll collection system known as O-PASS, however the county elected to discontinue its own toll collection program and instead contracted with the Orlando–Orange County Expressway Authority (OOCEA) to provide that service, so the O-PASS system was merged with the E-PASS system. As of 2018, OCX has merged with the Central Florida Expressway Authority (CFX), the successor to OOCEA, which currently operates the tolls on the Osceola Parkway. The Osceola Parkway also accepts SunPass accounts which are run by the Florida Department of Transportation and are accepted on most toll roads throughout the State of Florida.

== History ==
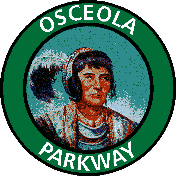
Original logo featuring Osceola, used until c. 2003

The road originally opened as Dart Boulevard on June 16, 1987 as a two-mile stretch between U.S. Highway 441 and Buenaventura Boulevard. During the early 1990s, Disney World and Osceola County officials extended and upgraded the road to its current 12.4 miles (20.0 km) parkway form, widened the lanes from two to four and added an interchange with Florida's Turnpike, with the highway opening on August 18, 1995.

A $19.2 million project has begun to widen 2.66 miles (4.28 km) of Osceola Parkway from two to four lanes between the intersections of Buenaventura Boulevard and Simpson Road from Myers Road to 600 feet (180 m) north of Osceola Parkway. The date of substantial completion for the second phase of work on the east-west road is April 1, 2015.

== Future ==
The Central Florida Expressway Authority (CFX) is planning an easterly extension as part of the Osceola County Beltway System. Following a 2012 feasibility study and a March 2013 public meeting, at which time the highway was under Osceola County Expressway Authority jurisdiction, the project team decided on an alignment along the county line, either leaving the current roadway east of Windy Cove Drive (Bridgewater subdivision) or following the current roadway to its end at Simpson Road and curving northeast there. A spur would extend north to SR 417 near Orlando International Airport. As of May 2024, CFX and the Fish & Wildlife Commission are moving forward with the design of this extension.

== Major intersections ==
County	Location	mi	km	Destinations	Notes
Orange	Bay Lake	0.0	0.0	Disney's Animal Kingdom Lodge	
Orange	Bay Lake	0.4	0.64	Disney's Animal Kingdom	Interchange
Orange	Bay Lake	1.4	2.3	To SR 429 / Florida's Turnpike – Disney's All-Star Resort, Blizzard Beach Water Park, Coronado Springs	Interchange with Buena Vista Drive
Orange	Bay Lake	2.2	3.5	To I-4 / US 192 – Disney's Hollywood Studios, Disney Springs, Magic Kingdom, Epcot (World Drive)	Interchange with World Drive; I-4 not signed eastbound
Orange	Bay Lake	3.0	4.8	Victory Way – ESPN Wide World of Sports, Disney's Hollywood Studios	Interchange
Osceola		4.1	6.6	I-4 – Orlando, Tampa	Exit 65 on I-4 (SR 400); western terminus of CR 522
Osceola		4.8	7.7	International Drive South to US 192 – Resort Area, Celebration	
Osceola		5.2	8.4	SR 417 to I-4 west – International Airport	Exit 3 on SR 417 (Central Florida GreeneWay)
Osceola		7.3	11.7	Poinciana Boulevard to US 192 / SR 535 – Resort Area, Medieval Times, Green Meadows Farm	Tolled eastbound exit and westbound entrance
Osceola	Kissimmee	10.0	16.1	Shingle Creek Toll Plaza	
Osceola	Kissimmee	11.4	18.3	US 17 Truck south / US 92 Truck west (John Young Parkway) – Downtown Kissimmee	Interchange; western terminus of US 17 Truck / US 92 Truck overlap
Osceola	Kissimmee	12.4	20.0	US 17 / US 92 / US 441 (Orange Blossom Trail) – Orlando, Kissimmee, Airport	Termini of US 17 Truck / US 92 Truck
Osceola	Kissimmee	12.8	20.6	Old Dixie Highway (CR 527 south)	
Osceola	Kissimmee	13.1	21.1	Orange Avenue (CR 527 north)	
Osceola	Kissimmee	13.5	21.7	Michigan Avenue (CR 531 south)	Northern terminus of CR 531
Osceola	Kissimmee–Buenaventura Lakes line	13.9	22.4	Florida's Turnpike	Exit 249 on Florida's Turnpike (SR 91)
Osceola	Buenaventura Lakes	17.5	28.2	Simpson Road (CR 530 west)	Western terminus of CR 530 concurrency
Osceola–Orange county line		18.7	30.1	Boggy Creek Road (CR 530) to CR 15 – Airport	CR 530 continues east
1.000 mi = 1.609 km; 1.000 km = 0.621 mi: Concurrency terminus; Electronic toll collection
