= Holden Lakes, Florida =

Unincorporated area in Florida, US

- Unincorporated community Census designated place
- Interactive map of Holden Lakes, Florida
- Coordinates: 28°29′55″N 81°23′14″W
- Country: United States
- State: Florida
- County: Orange
- Elevation: 89 ft (27 m)
- Time zone: UTC-5 (Eastern (EST))
  - Summer (DST): UTC-4 (EDT)
- GNIS feature ID: 2830232

Holden Lakes is an unincorporated community and census designated place in Orange County, Florida, United States.

== Demographics ==
Holden Lakes first appeared as a census designated place in the 2022 American Community Survey.

The population was estimated at 3,591 in the 2022 American Community Survey.
