= Bull Creek, Florida =

Coordinates: 28°05′34″N 80°58′47″W

Bull Creek
- Unincorporated community
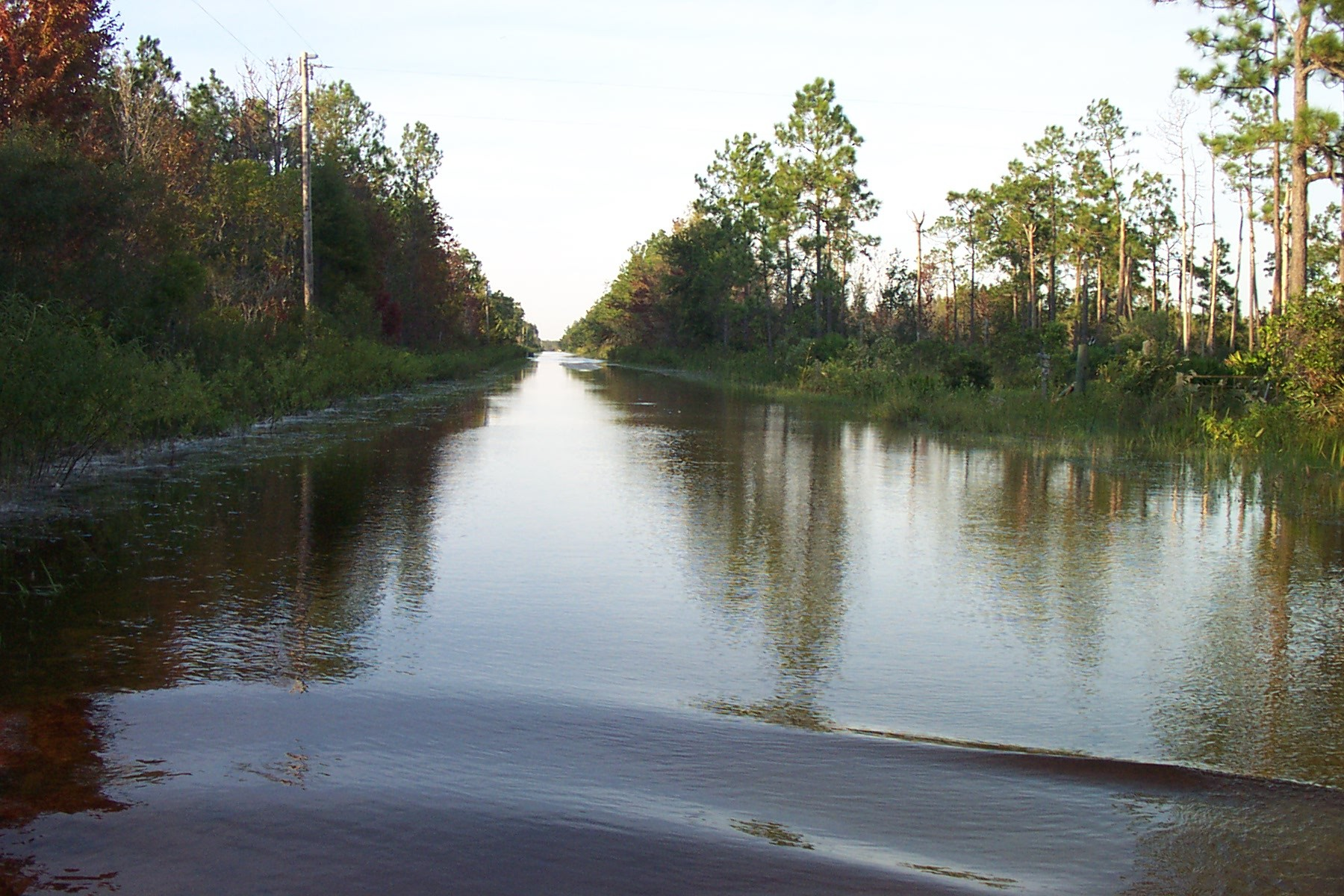
- Crabgrass Road, under three feet of water
- Interactive map of Bull Creek
- Country: United States
- State: Florida
- County: Osceola

Bull Creek is a rural unincorporated community in Osceola County, Florida, United States. It is located approximately 7 miles (11 km) east of Holopaw and 30 miles (48 km) west of Melbourne.

Bull Creek is part of the Orlando–Kissimmee Metropolitan Statistical Area.

== Geography ==
The community name derives from Bull Creek and the Bull Creek Wildlife Management Area that borders it. It is in the Eastern Standard time zone. Elevation is 65 feet (20 m).

The latitude of Bull Creek is 28.093N. The longitude is -80.976W.

== History ==
George W. Hopkins purchased 104,000 acres (420 km^{2}) in east-central Florida in 1902, including what would become Bull Creek. Hopkins build a small railroad to move timber, mostly Cypress to his sawmill in Melbourne, the area was heavily logged from 1912 until 1928.

Cypress is still being harvested from the area surrounding Bull Creek but the trees are smaller and used mostly for mulch.

In 1967, 23,350 acres (9,450 ha) were purchased by the state for flood control, the Bull Creek area feeds the Saint Johns River and a large levee was built to control the water released into the river. In 1970, the state-owned land was leased to the Florida Fish and Wildlife Conservation Commission (FWC) to be used as a wildlife management area (WMA). The Bull Creek WMA was renamed for former Fish and Wildlife Conservation Commission chairman Hershey A. “Herky” Huffman (1937-2011), a native Floridian, avid outdoorsman and a staunch environmentalist.

== Demographics ==
The population of Bull Creek consists of less than 100 mostly working-class families who prefer a rural lifestyle.

Zoning is agricultural with no more than one single-family home per 5 acres (20,000 m^{2}) allowed, agricultural land can be used for conservation, cattle, timber and other agricultural uses.

== Recreation ==
Bull Creek WMA offers more than 23,000 acres (93 km^{2}) of recreational land, open to the public year round for hiking, horseback riding, and viewing wildlife. Fishing at Billy Lake, Crabgrass Creek and Bull Creek is common and when in season deer, hog, turkey and small game hunting is available.
