= Florida State Road 423 =

Highway in Florida

State Road 423 and County Road 423
- County Road 423
- SR 423 in red, CR 423 in blue

Route information
- Length: 21.33 mi (34.33 km) 7.533 miles (12.123 km) as SR 423
- Existed: early 1970s–present

Major junctions
- South end: John Young Parkway in Hunters Creek
- SR 417 in Hunters Creek; SR 528 near Williamsburg; I-4 in Orlando; SR 408 in Orlando; US 441 in Orlando; I-4 in Orlando
- East end: US 17 / US 92 in Winter Park

Location
- Country: United States
- State: Florida
- County: Orange

Highway system
- Florida State Highway System; Interstate; US; State; Former; Pre‑1945; Toll; Scenic
← SR 421	→ SR 424

State Road 423 (SR 423), known for most of its length as John Young Parkway, and Lee Road east of Orange Blossom Trail, is a four- and six-lane surface road in the U.S. state of Florida. SR 423 runs from SR 408 north to U.S. Routes 17/92 (US 17/92) just east of Interstate 4 (I-4).

SR 423 and its southern components serve as an alternate to the parallel Orange Blossom Trail. The road is named after John Young, a NASA astronaut and one of twelve men to walk on the Moon, who was from the Orlando area.

== Route description ==
SR 423 is signed north–south when named John Young Parkway, while as Lee Road it is signed east–west.

SR 423 begins at an interchange with SR 408 and heads north towards Orange Blossom Trail. It then changes names to Lee Road east of Orange Blossom Trail, becoming an east–west road to its terminus at U.S. Route 17/92 just east of Interstate 4.

South of State Road 423's southern terminus, John Young Parkway, known as County Road 423 continues south towards I-4, the Beachline Expressway and the Central Florida GreeneWay. South of the Osceola-Orange county line, it is unsigned County Road 531A and continues to a single-point urban interchange with Osceola Parkway, ending a bit north of Pleasant Hill Road near Kissimmee, where the name changes to Orange Blossom Trail heading towards Campbell and to the Osceola-Polk county line. The section from US 192 southward is also numbered US 17-92.

== History ==
The first section of SR 423 was built by the Florida Department of Transportation in the early 1970s, from Colonial Drive (SR 50) west of downtown Orlando north to Orange Blossom Trail (US 441-SR 500). Over the years, extensions to the south have been built, some by Orange County and some by the state.

== Future ==
An additional extension—which included widening the existing roadway from four to six lanes from Shader Road to the U.S. 441/Orange Blossom Trail intersection, constructing two new overpasses and completing a new 1-mile alignment extension to Forest City Road/S.R. 434 at the intersection with Edgewater Drive/S.R. 424—was completed in 2013. Benefits of the extension include a direct connection between John Young Parkway and SR 434 and a much-improved alternate route to serve commuters during I-4 Ultimate construction.

Future improvements include widening John Young Parkway from SR 50 to Shader Road from four lanes to six lanes. This capacity improvement project will also improve the level of service and enhance safety. Design is expected to be complete in Spring 2015. Construction is currently not funded; the duration is anticipated to be 24 to 30 months.

== Major intersections ==
The entire route is in Orange County.

Location	mi	km	Destinations	Notes
Hunters Creek	0.0	0.0	John Young Parkway south	Continuation into Osceola County
Hunters Creek	1.8	2.9	SR 417 to I-4 – International Airport	Exit 10 on SR 417 (Central Florida GreeneWay)
	5.2	8.4	SR 528 to I-4 – International Airport, Cocoa	Exit 3 on SR 528 (Beachline Expressway)
	7.2	11.6	SR 482 (Sand Lake Road) to US 17 / US 92 / US 441 (Orange Blossom Trail) / International Drive	Interchange
Oak Ridge	9.0	14.5	Oak Ridge Road (CR 528A)	
Orlando	11.5	18.5	I-4 – Tampa, Daytona Beach	Exit 79 on I-4 (SR 400)
Orlando	13.8 0.000	22.2 0.000	Church Street	Transition from CR 423 to SR 423
Orlando	0.17	0.27	SR 408 to I-4 – Downtown Orlando, Ocoee	Exit 7 on SR 408 (East-West Expressway)
Orlando	0.394	0.634	CR 526 (Old Winter Garden Road)	
Orlando	0.880	1.416	SR 50 (Colonial Drive) – Winter Garden	
Orlando	2.082	3.351	SR 438 (Princeton Street)	
Orlando	2.662	4.284	SR 416 (Silver Star Road) – Ocoee, Winter Garden	
Orlando	4.0	6.4	SR 434 east – Altamonte Springs	interchange; northbound exit and southbound entrance; western terminus of SR 434
Orlando	4.102	6.602	US 441 (Orange Blossom Trail) – Apopka, Orlando	Road is unsigned SR 500
Orlando	4.839	7.788	SR 424 (Edgewater Drive)	
Winter Park	6.250	10.058	I-4 / US 17 Truck north / US 92 Truck east – Tampa	Exit 88 on I-4 (SR 400)
Winter Park	6.336	10.197	Wymore Road – Eatonville	
Winter Park	7.533	12.123	US 17 / US 92 (Orlando Avenue)	Road is unsigned SR 15 / SR 600
1.000 mi = 1.609 km; 1.000 km = 0.621 mi: Incomplete access; Tolled; Route transition
