= 1900 Building =

Coordinates: 28.07942°N 80.60326°W

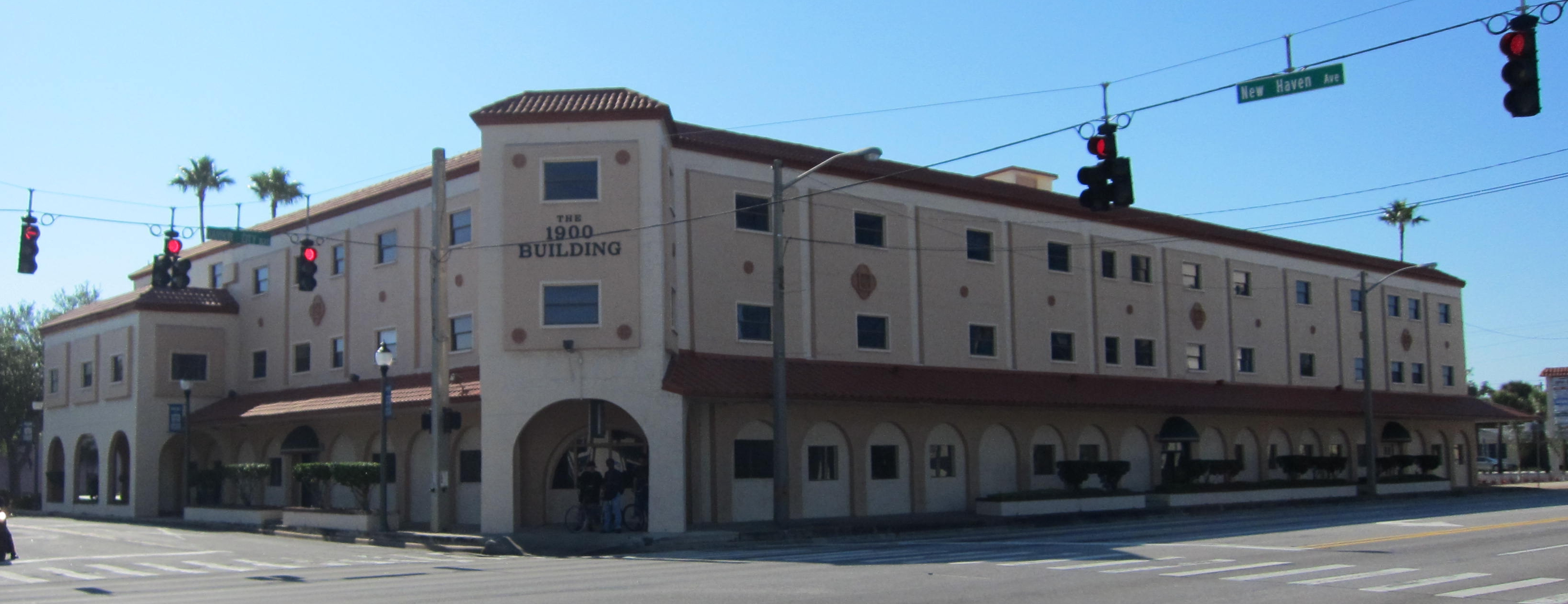
- 1900 Building
- Interactive map of the 1900 Building area

General information
- Location: 1900 South Harbor City Boulevard; Melbourne, Florida, United States
- Completed: 1924
- Client: Elton Hall (Developer)

The 1900 Building is a historic U.S. building located at 1900 South Harbor City Boulevard, Melbourne, Florida. This three story building was constructed in 1924 and originally opened as the Melbourne Hotel. The building housed several businesses through the years, including a bank, specialty stores and professional offices. The building has seen significant architectural changes over the years, with the reconstruction of the corner tower, elimination of the original windows, reconstruction of the covered walkways, and elimination of the dome atop the tower. The building received its current name from its address -- "1900" South Harbour City Boulevard.
