= Osceola County, Florida =

County in Florida, United States

- County
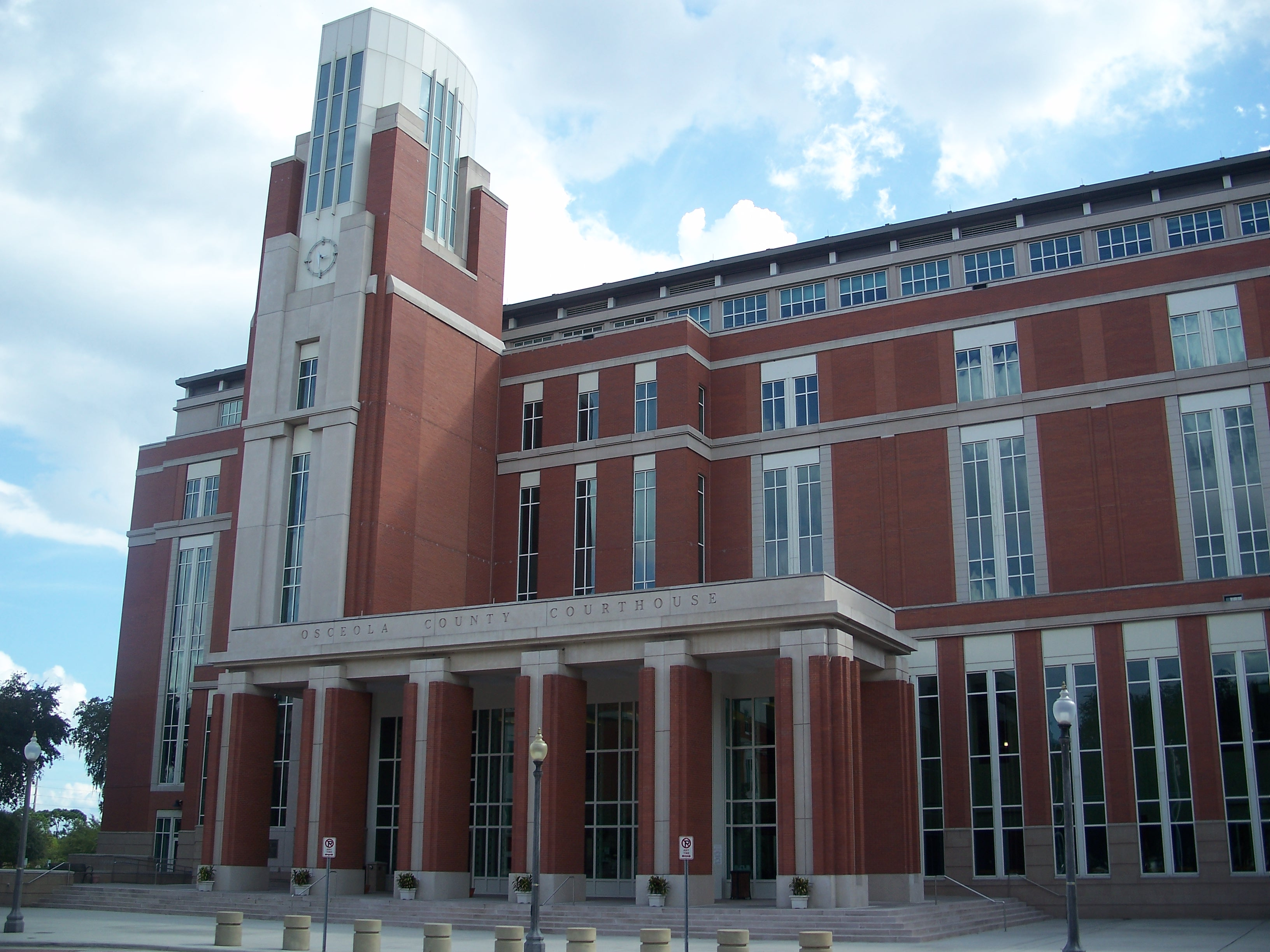
- The Osceola County Courthouse in October 2009

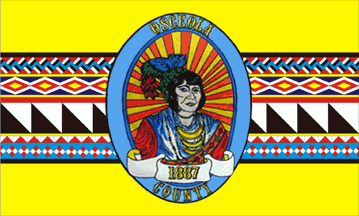
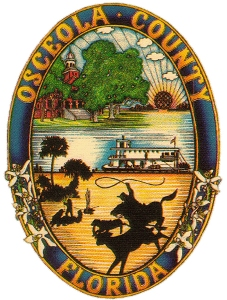
- Flag Seal Logo

- Location within the U.S. state of Florida
- Coordinates: 28°04′N 81°09′W
- Country: United States
- State: Florida
- Founded: May 12, 1887
- Named for: Osceola
- Seat: Kissimmee
- Largest city: Kissimmee

Area
  - Total: 1,506 sq mi (3,900 km^{2})
  - Land: 1,327 sq mi (3,440 km^{2})
  - Water: 178 sq mi (460 km^{2}) 11.9%

Population (2020)
  - Total: 388,656
  - Estimate (2025): 481,718 ▲
  - Density: 292.9/sq mi (113.1/km^{2})
- Time zone: UTC−5 (Eastern)
  - Summer (DST): UTC−4 (EDT)
- Congressional district: 9th
- Website: www.osceola.org

Osceola County (/ˌɒsiˈoʊlə/ OSS-ee-OH-lə) is a county located in the central portion of the U.S. state of Florida. As of the 2020 census, the population was 388,656. Its county seat is Kissimmee. Osceola County is included in the Orlando–Kissimmee–Sanford, Fla. Metropolitan Statistical Area.

Being 54.3% Hispanic, Osceola is one of three Hispanic-majority counties in Florida, owing to its large Puerto Rican American population. It also is the 12th-largest majority-Hispanic county in the nation.

== Etymology ==
Osceola County is named for the Native American leader Osceola, whose name means "Black Drink Cry [Asi Yaholo]".

== History ==
Osceola County was created in 1887. On July 21, 1821, Florida was divided into two counties, named Escambia County to the west and St. John's County to the east. In 1824, the southern part of St. John's County became Mosquito County, with Enterprise as the county seat. In 1844, Brevard County was carved out from Mosquito County. When Florida became a state in 1845, Mosquito County was renamed Orange County. On May 12, 1887, Osceola was named a county, having been created from both Orange and Brevard Counties. Osceola County reached all the way down to Lake Okeechobee until 1917 when Okeechobee County was formed.

Since the late 20th century, Osceola County has experienced a significant influx of migrants from the Commonwealth of Puerto Rico, the unincorporated territory of the United States, and in the 2000 U.S. census Puerto Rican was the largest self-reported ancestry group.

== Government ==
Osceola County is a charter county and a subdivision within the State of Florida. Voters approved the County Charter in March 1992, and it took effect on October 1, 1992. The structure of County government under the charter does not depart dramatically from the structure of a County government outlined in the Florida Statutes.

Osceola County Government is governed by three sets of elected officials, each of which independently directs separate branches of County Government. These include: the five-member County Commission, five separate Constitutional Officers, and a number of Judicial Officers. Under State law, the County Commission is responsible for funding the budgets of all Osceola County Government, including the independently elected Constitutional Officers and Judicial Officers, as well as the Commission's own departments. Each independent officer has discretion to administer his or her own programs. The County Commission exercises oversight only over its own departments.

Osceola County has five electoral districts each represented by a commissioner. All the commissioners compose the Board of Commissioners that appoint a County Manager. There also is a Commission Auditor and County Attorney.

=== Commission ===
Board of County Commissioners

- District 1 – Peggy Choudhry (D)
- District 2 – Viviana Janer (D)
- District 3 – Brandon Arrington (D)
- District 4 – Cheryl Grieb (D)
- District 5 – Ricky Booth (R)

=== Executive ===
- County Manager – Don Fisher
- Deputy County Manager - Beth Knight
- Assistant County Manager - Donna Renberg
- County Attorney - Frank Townsend

=== Constitutional officers ===
- Sheriff – Christopher Blackmon (interim)
- Property appraiser – Katrina Scarborough (D)
- Clerk of the Circuit Court & Comptroller – Kelvin Soto (D)
- Supervisor of elections – Mary Jane Arrington (D)
- Tax collector – Bruce Vickers (D)
- Public defender – Melissa Vickers (D)
- State attorney – Monique Worrell (D)
- State Representative - Erika Booth (D)
- State Representative - Paula Stark (R)
- State Representative - Jose Alvarez (D)
- State Representative - Leonard Spencer (D)

Osceola County was a Republican stronghold in presidential elections from about 1950 up until 1996, when Bill Clinton carried Florida with a plurality. It swung back to support George W. Bush in 2004, but then heavily supported Democrat Barack Obama in 2008, and up until 2024 it had supported Democrats by large margins. In 2024 the county swung back to support Republican Donald Trump, mirroring trends seen in the rest of the state of Florida.

United States presidential election results for Osceola County, Florida
Year	Republican		Democratic		Third party(ies)	
Year	No.	%	No.	%	No.	%
1892	0	0.00%	259	94.18%	16	5.82%
1896	118	28.78%	274	66.83%	18	4.39%
1900	42	11.29%	266	71.51%	64	17.20%
1904	65	18.41%	271	76.77%	17	4.82%
1908	81	24.11%	193	57.44%	62	18.45%
1912	110	12.37%	512	57.59%	267	30.03%
1916	453	38.98%	511	43.98%	198	17.04%
1920	1,035	55.32%	728	38.91%	108	5.77%
1924	589	33.45%	884	50.20%	288	16.35%
1928	1,760	60.25%	1,127	38.58%	34	1.16%
1932	906	35.36%	1,656	64.64%	0	0.00%
1936	1,101	40.43%	1,622	59.57%	0	0.00%
1940	1,428	41.48%	2,015	58.52%	0	0.00%
1944	1,400	44.26%	1,763	55.74%	0	0.00%
1948	1,575	44.59%	1,577	44.65%	380	10.76%
1952	3,133	62.25%	1,900	37.75%	0	0.00%
1956	3,602	65.19%	1,923	34.81%	0	0.00%
1960	4,691	68.29%	2,178	31.71%	0	0.00%
1964	4,516	56.12%	3,531	43.88%	0	0.00%
1968	4,172	43.90%	1,870	19.68%	3,462	36.43%
1972	9,320	82.94%	1,875	16.69%	42	0.37%
1976	7,062	49.82%	6,893	48.63%	220	1.55%
1980	10,863	59.67%	6,603	36.27%	739	4.06%
1984	18,348	73.45%	6,628	26.53%	4	0.02%
1988	21,355	68.05%	9,812	31.27%	214	0.68%
1992	19,143	42.29%	15,010	33.16%	11,114	24.55%
1996	18,337	39.44%	21,874	47.05%	6,280	13.51%
2000	26,237	47.11%	28,187	50.61%	1,266	2.27%
2004	43,117	52.45%	38,633	47.00%	454	0.55%
2008	40,086	39.72%	59,962	59.41%	877	0.87%
2012	40,592	37.27%	67,239	61.73%	1,091	1.00%
2016	50,301	35.56%	85,458	60.41%	5,709	4.04%
2020	73,480	42.53%	97,297	56.31%	2,007	1.16%
2024	86,713	50.19%	84,205	48.74%	1,862	1.08%

== Geography ==
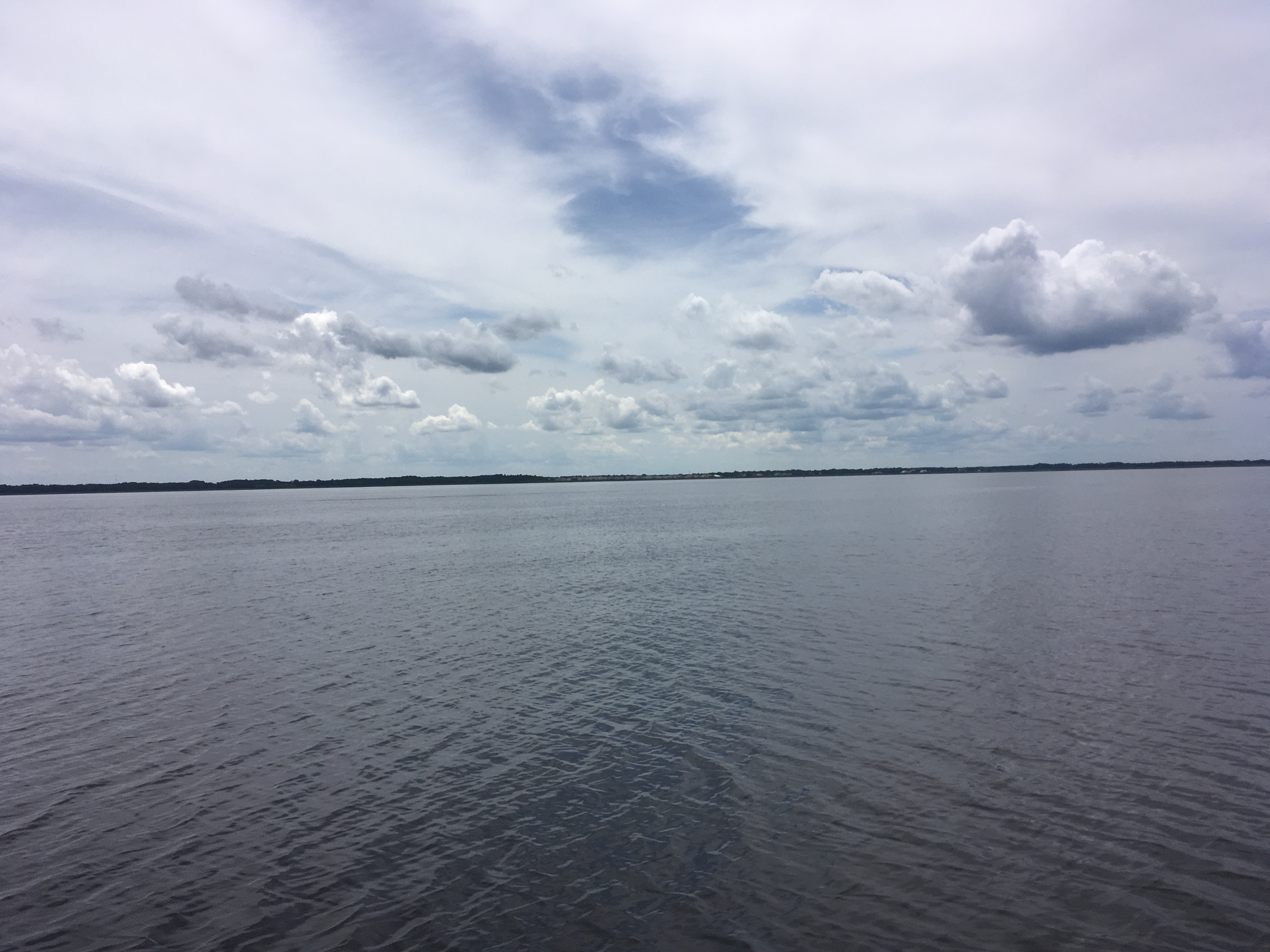
Lake Tohopekaliga, the largest lake in Osceola County

According to the U.S. Census Bureau, the county has a total area of 1,506 square miles (3,900 km^{2}), of which 1,327 square miles (3,440 km^{2}) is land and 178 square miles (460 km^{2}) (11.9%) is water.

=== Adjacent counties ===
- Orange County – north
- Brevard County – northeast
- Indian River County – east
- Okeechobee County – southeast
- Highlands County – south
- Polk County – west
- Lake County – northwest

== Transportation ==
=== Rail ===
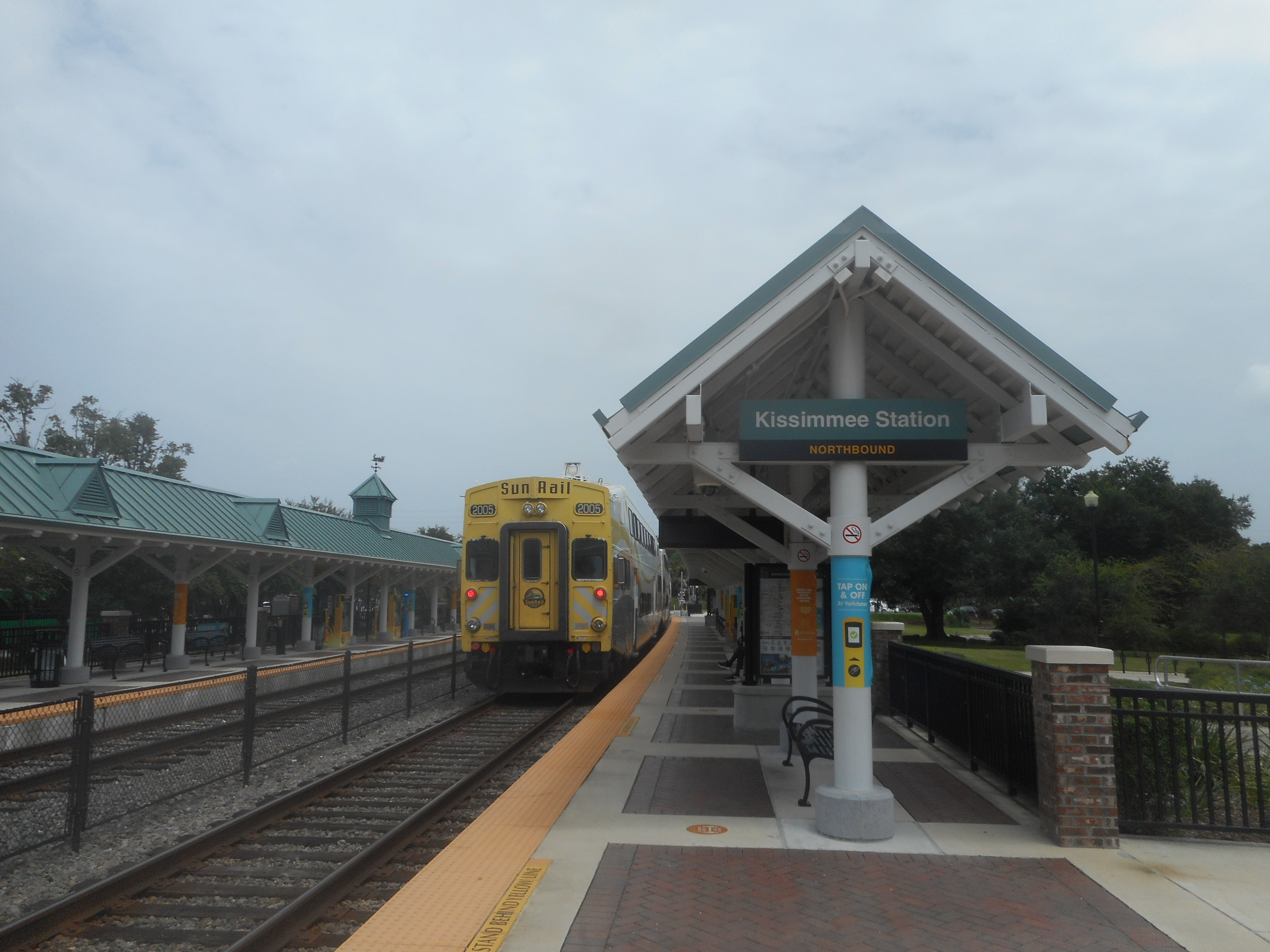
SunRail commuter train at Kissimmee Station

CSX's A-line, formerly the Atlantic Coast Line Railroad mainline, and originally built by the South Florida Railroad in the 1880s, runs through the urbanized northern part of the county. CSX has leased the line to the FDOT. Intercity passenger service is provided by Amtrak at Kissimmee station and commuter passenger service is operated by SunRail, with stops at Tupperware station and Kissimmee Amtrak in Kissimmee, as well as Poinciana station north of Poinciana.

=== Airports ===
- Kissimmee Gateway Airport

=== Major highways ===
- I-4
- Florida's Turnpike
- International Drive
- US 17 / US 92 (Orange Blossom Trail)
- US 192 (Irlo Bronson Memorial Highway)
- US 441
- CR 15
- SR 60
- SR 417 (Central Florida GreeneWay)
- SR 423 (John Young Parkway)
- SR 429 (Western Expressway)
- CR 522 (Osceola Parkway)
- CR 527 (Orange Avenue)
- CR 535 (Apopka-Vineland Road)

=== Buses ===
- Lynx, a public bus authority based in Orange County which also serves Lake, Polk, Seminole, and Volusia Counties in Central Florida.
- Citrus Connection, the public bus authority based in Lakeland, Polk County, has at least four routes also serving Osceola County.

== Demographics ==
Historical population
Census	Pop.	Note	%±
1890	3,133		—
1900	3,444		9.9%
1910	5,507		59.9%
1920	7,195		30.7%
1930	10,699		48.7%
1940	10,119		−5.4%
1950	11,406		12.7%
1960	19,029		66.8%
1970	25,267		32.8%
1980	49,287		95.1%
1990	107,728		118.6%
2000	172,493		60.1%
2010	268,685		55.8%
2020	388,656		44.7%
2025 (est.)	481,718	▲	23.9%
U.S. Decennial Census; 1790-1960 1900-1990

=== Racial and ethnic composition ===
Osceola County, Florida – Racial and ethnic composition Note: the US Census treats Hispanic/Latino as an ethnic category. This table excludes Latinos from the racial categories and assigns them to a separate category. Hispanics/Latinos may be of any race.
Race / Ethnicity (NH = Non-Hispanic)	Pop 1980	Pop 1990	Pop 2000	Pop 2010	Pop 2020	% 1980	% 1990	% 2000	% 2010	% 2020
White alone (NH)	44,682	87,439	102,792	108,292	113,362	90.66%	81.17%	59.59%	40.30%	29.17%
Black or African American alone (NH)	3,003	5,452	11,075	24,503	35,145	6.09%	5.06%	6.42%	9.12%	9.04%
Native American or Alaska Native alone (NH)	119	326	519	596	562	0.24%	0.30%	0.30%	0.22%	0.14%
Asian alone (NH)	284	1,558	3,721	7,120	11,370	0.58%	1.45%	2.16%	2.65%	2.93%
Native Hawaiian or Pacific Islander alone (NH)	x	x	97	229	240	x	x	0.06%	0.09%	0.06%
Other race alone (NH)	110	87	535	1,393	4,218	0.22%	0.08%	0.31%	0.52%	1.09%
Mixed race or Multiracial (NH)	x	x	3,027	4,406	12,670	x	x	1.75%	1.64%	3.26%
Hispanic or Latino (any race)	1,089	12,866	50,727	122,146	211,089	2.21%	11.94%	29.41%	45.46%	54.31%
Total	49,287	107,728	172,493	268,685	388,656	100.00%	100.00%	100.00%	100.00%	100.00%

=== 2020 census ===
As of the 2020 census, the county had a population of 388,656. The median age was 37.6 years, with 23.4% of residents under the age of 18 and 14.1% of residents aged 65 years or older. For every 100 females there were 93.6 males, and for every 100 females age 18 and over there were 90.3 males age 18 and over. There were 130,574 households in the county, of which 38.4% had children under the age of 18 living in them. Of all households, 51.0% were married-couple households, 14.9% were households with a male householder and no spouse or partner present, and 25.9% were households with a female householder and no spouse or partner present. About 17.6% of all households were made up of individuals and 6.9% had someone living alone who was 65 years of age or older.

The majority of Hispanics/Latinos in the county are Puerto Ricans, who account for an estimated 33.7% of the population and are the largest ancestral group in the county.

The racial makeup of the county was 40.6% White, 10.5% Black or African American, 0.6% American Indian and Alaska Native, 3.0% Asian, 0.1% Native Hawaiian and Pacific Islander, 20.1% from some other race, and 25.1% from two or more races. Hispanic or Latino residents of any race comprised 54.3% of the population.

93.7% of residents lived in urban areas, while 6.3% lived in rural areas.

There were 154,680 housing units, of which 15.6% were vacant. Among occupied housing units, 62.5% were owner-occupied and 37.5% were renter-occupied. The homeowner vacancy rate was 2.6% and the rental vacancy rate was 11.6%.

The median income for a household in the county was $72,637. The per capita income for the county was $32,676. About 13.0% of the population were below the poverty line.

=== Religion ===
184,408 county residents, 47.4% of the total county population of 388,656 in 2020, adhere to a religion. Of the 47.4% of Religious adherents, 23.3% (90,477) are Catholic Christians, 9.5% (36,990) are Non-denominational Christians, 6.8% (26,428) are Evangelical Protestant Christians, 2.6% (10,364) are Jehovah’s Witnesses, 1.0% (4,144) are LDS, 0.8% (3,076) are Seventh-Day Adventist, 1.1% (4,385) are Mainline Protestant Christians, and 0.01% (65) are Eastern Orthodox Christians, making a total Christian population of 174,895, 45.0% of the county’s population. 1.9% (7,533) adhere to Islam, 0.4% (1,574) adhere to Theravada Buddhism, and 0.1% (393) adhere to Hinduism.

=== 2010 census ===
As of the 2010 census, there were 111,539 households; 57% were married couples living together, 23% had a female householder with no spouse present, 7% had a male householder with no spouse present, and 13% were non-families. The average household size was 3.4 persons per household.

In the county, the population was spread out, with 12% being 0 to 9 years old, 15% 10 to 19, 14% 20 to 29, 15% from 30 to 39, 13% from 40 to 49, 11% 50 to 59, and 19% who were 60 years of age or older. The median age was 36 years. For every 100 females, there were 97.20 males. For every 100 females age 18 and over, there were 94.20 males.

The median income for a household in the county was $52,279. The per capita income for the county was $22,196. About 13.4% of the population were below the poverty line, including 18.00% of those under age 18 and 10.00% of those age 65 or over.

== Education ==
The School District of Osceola County, Florida serves the county. The county is home to 59 schools, not including colleges.

=== Colleges ===
- Johnson University Florida
- Florida Technical College
- Heritage University & Seminary
- Stetson University
- Valencia College - Osceola Campus & Poinciana Campus

=== Libraries ===
There are currently six branches of the Osceola County Library System:

- Buenaventura Lakes Library - Kissimmee, FL
- Hart Memorial Library - Kissimmee, FL
- Kenansville Library - Kenansville, FL
- Poinciana Library - Kissimmee, FL
- St. Cloud Veterans Memorial Library - St. Cloud, FL
- West Osceola Library - Celebration, FL

The Hart Memorial Library is home to the Ray Shanks Law Library, and TechCentral the library system's "creative space".

==== History ====
Until 1989, there was no independent Osceola Library System. Instead, Osceola patrons were taken care of by Orange County Library System. Before that, there were two libraries, which are still named after the original independent libraries, run by women's organizations: Veteran's Memorial in Saint Cloud and Hart Memorial Library in Kissimmee.

In 1910, land for the Hart Memorial Library was donated by a widow of a former Florida Governor, Carrie S. Hart. It was located on North Stewart Avenue in Kissimmee . In 1914, women pooled money together from themselves and other community members to build the actual building and Annie Palmer Fell, another widow of a prominent Florida man, donated furnishings and books from her personal collection to begin building inventory in the new library. In 1968, the location moved to a 4,000 square foot building on Broadway and Dakin. Hart Memorial Library is the Osceola headquarters and is now located in a 43,000 square building .

Veteran's Memorial Library was at first a reading room until enough funds were raised to build the first official location on Massachusetts Avenue in Saint Cloud. In the early 70's the location moved to a former SunBank location on 10th Street and New York Avenue. In 1995, this branch moved for its final time to a larger building on Indiana Avenue and 13th street where it is still located today.

The first Poinciana Branch was opened in 1988. It was a modular building and consisted of a 14,000 book collection. This branch was eventually moved into a larger location with a collection of 40,000 books and computer access for patrons.

Osceola Library Systems began as an independent organization on April 1, 1989.

In 1990, the Buenaventura Library opened.

In 1991, volunteers helped open the Kenansville Branch Library in a shared space with the old Kenansville school. During the 2004 hurricanes, the collection was a total loss. It was rebuilt in 2007 with a larger collection, including books, DVDs, and computer/wifi access.

== Communities ==
=== Cities ===
- Kissimmee
- St. Cloud

=== Census-designated places ===
- Buenaventura Lakes
- Campbell
- Celebration
- Four Corners
- Poinciana
- Yeehaw Junction

=== Other unincorporated communities ===
- Bull Creek
- Deer Park
- Harmony
- Holopaw
- Kenansville
- Narcoossee
- Whittier – the hamlet along Harvey Road especially near its intersection with Whitman Road; Zip Code: 34739.
- Intercession City

=== Planned development ===
Back in 2009, there were plans to create a new city named Destiny near the intersection of the Florida Turnpike and US 441. The project was halted by The Florida Department of Community Affairs after concerns that there would be mass urban sprawl. The area is now a reserve named after the city's planner, Fred DeLuca. If finished, the city would've had an expected population of 250,000.

=== Special districts ===
- Central Florida Tourism Oversight District
- Crescent Lake Common Facilities District

=== Former communities ===
- Apoxsee
- Illahaw
- Kicco
- Locosee
- Nittaw
- Runnymede
- Tohopkee

== See also ==
- National Register of Historic Places listings in Osceola County, Florida
