= List of county roads in Hernando County, Florida =

- County road shields used in Florida

Highway names
- Interstates: Interstate X (I-X)
- US Highways: U.S. Highway X (US X)
- State: State Road X (SR X)
- County: County Road X (CR X)

System links
- County roads in Florida; County roads in Hernando County

The following is a list of county roads in Hernando County, Florida. All county roads are maintained by the county in which they reside. Unsigned routes may no longer exist.

== County Road 439 ==
Lingle Road
- Location: Istachatta

County Road 439 is named Lingle Road. It runs south to north from CR 476 in Istachatta to Pineola across the Hernando-Citrus County Line where it becomes County Road 39. The route was itself part of CR 39, as well as State Road 39.

== County Road 445 ==
Main Street, Howell Avenue
- Location: Brooksville-North of Brooksville

County Road 445 is named Main Street and Howell Avenue. It runs south to north from SR 50/US 98 Truck in Brooksville through the heart of downtown Brooksville, and terminates at US 41 north of Brooksville. It was formerly SR 45A, and later CR 45A, before being designated CR 445. At one time the route included Mitchell Road.

The route is named Main Street from SR 50/US 98 Truck to West and East Fort Dade Avenue (unmarked CR 484), and Howell Avenue from there to US 41.

== County Road 476 ==
Centralia Boulevard Citrus Way Lake Lindsey Road
- Location: Weeki Wachee North-Nobleton

County Road 476 is a long bi-county road in northern Hernando County. It runs west to east and includes Centralia Boulevard, Citrus Way, and Lake Lindsey Road. The route spans from US 19 in the Royal Highlands area to Nobleton, where it crosses the Hernando-Sumter County Line at a bridge over the Withlacoochee River. The route overlaps CR 491 at Citrus Way and CR 481 at Snow Memorial Highway, and was former SR 476

=== Route description ===
County Road 476 begins at US 19 along Centralia Boulevard, which runs almost entirely straight east. At first it runs along the southern edge of the Annutteliga Hammock preserve, but beyond that it mostly passes sparse farmland and residencies. After the northern terminus of CR 483, it runs beneath the Suncoast Parkway. Local farmland continues further east, but become hidden by more dense forests, especially as the road runs north of the Fickett Hammock Preserve.

Centralia Road terminates at CR 491 (Citrus Way), but CR 476 turns northeast onto that route, then curves directly to the east between the mining lands of northern Hernando County. After CR 476/491 makes a sharp turn to the north, CR 476 breaks away at Lake Lindsey Road, which heads straight east once again. In this segment it still runs north of a local sand mine, until it makes a sharp turn to the north at Alligator Trail, and another entrance to one of the mines. After a grade crossing with the CSX Brooksville Subdivision Lake Lindsey Road makes a sharp turn to the east while Annutalaga Avenue continues to the north. Shortly after the previously mentioned intersection CR 476 encounters a blinker light at US 98. After this intersection, it crosses a former railroad spur to a mine, and winds around some swampy lakes near some private houses before heading straight east through a mostly wooded area. Somewhere along this segment, it also crosses the former right-of-way of a Seaboard Air Line Railroad line between Brooksville and Inverness, north of Simmons Prairie Lake. The road begins to curve more often, and even climbs and descends along some hills as it passes by many local dead end street. One of the few intersections not to be a dead end street (at least south of the route) is Old Crystal River Road, which leads to US 41 north of Brooksville. A noteworthy sharp left curve is a sign the road is about to enter Lake Lindsey, because that curve is to go around the lake for which the community is named. After passing between a church and a cemetery, the road seems to terminate at an intersection of County Road 481, but in reality, it makes a sharp turn to the south, and shortly makes another one to the east along the northern border of Chinsegut Nature Center. The road makes another reverse curve and then descends as it approaches the southern edge of the Withlacoochee State Forest before encountering another blinker light at US 41. East of that light, the route passes a Hernando County fire station, and curves mostly towards the northeast through forestland and farmland. Among the sites along this segment of road is the unfinished dinosaur previously planned for an amusement park.

After the intersection with Daly Road, the route runs along the southern edge of Lake Townsen Regional Park, then curves to the northeast until it approaches a wye intersection with County Road 439, on the southwest corner of Withlacoochee Riverside Community Park. From there it curves southeast until it approaches the intersection with Lucy Shade Lane, and immediately after this, the crossing of the Withlacoochee State Trail. No sooner than this, the road enters Nobleton, where it passes by the Nobleton Wayside Park, across from Edgewater Avenue, which is the site of the local post office, and was once part of State Road 39. The road then curves briefly to the southeast as it passes by a local gift shop as well a restaurant, and the Nobleton Outpost recreational area before finally terminating at a bridge over the Withlacoochee River, where the road becomes Sumter County Road 476 as it heads towards Bushnell and an area north of Bevilles Corner.

=== County Road 476A ===
Snow Hill Road
- Location: Lake Lindsey

Former County Road 476A is Snow Hill Road. It ran west to east from Jones Road to CR 481 in Lake Lindsey, and was formerly designated as SR 476A. No connection to its parent route is known. At one time it went as far west as CR 491A in Stafford.

== County Road 480 ==
Croom Road
- Location: North of Brooksville-Withlacoochee State Forest

County Road 480 runs along part of Croom Road in northern Brooksville. It runs east and west from US 41 Brooksville into Withlacoochee State Forest where it terminates in Croom at the intersection with Croom-Rital Road and Nobleton-Croom Road (both former Florida State Road 39) just west of a crossing of the Withlacoochee State Trail. Though another CR 480 exists in nearby Citrus County, Hernando CR 480 has no connection to that route.

== County Road 481 ==
Snow Memorial Highway
- Location: North of Brooksville

County Road 481 is Snow Memorial Highway, a former segment of County Road 581. It runs south to north from US 41 near Chinsegut Hill to the Hernando-Citrus County Line, where it becomes County Road 581. The route itself was once a former segment of SR 581

=== Route description ===
County Road 481 begins at a wye intersection with US 41 that includes a trailhead for the Chinsegut Nature Center, and almost instantly passes the driveway to the Chinsegut Hill Manor House. Within Lake Lindsey, the road has a brief multiplex with CR 476. The rest of the road passes primarily through farmland, and aside from the intersection of Snow Hill Road (former CR 476A), has no other intersections with any county, state, US or interstate routes even as it crosses the Hernando-Citrus County Line.

== County Road 484 ==
Fort Dade Road, Mondon Hill Road
- Location: Wiscon-Hill 'n Dale

County Road 484 is a mainly west to east county road running along West Fort Dade Road as well as Mondon Hill Road. It begins at CR 570 in Wiscon, east of Spring Hill, and ends at SR 50/US 98 & CR 541 in Hill 'n Dale. The route is unmarked in the City of Brooksville, including along East Fort Dade Road, and was formerly SR 485 east of US 41.

=== Route description ===
The route begins at CR 570 as West Fort Dade Avenue and runs northeast, where it crosses Florida State Road 50. It continues to run in the same direction through some wooded residential areas until it makes a sharp curve to the right at the Spring Hill Cemetery and runs east. Almost immediately after this turn, it climbs a hill and serves as the southern terminus of CR 491. East of there it descends as a tree-lined forest road over random dry creeks. Residencies become more abundant as it approaches a blinker-light intersection with CR 485, which also serves as part of U.S. Truck Route 98. East of CR 485, the same rural residential surroundings continue, although some local commercial properties turn up randomly. The route nearly diminishes as it continues through the Brooksville City Limits. Further eastern access is cut off by a divider at US 98, which is used to channelize left turn lanes onto eastbound SR 50A. The road continues east of US 98 with some houses, although one church can be found on the northeast corner of Stafford Avenue. Drivers who were detoured by the median on US 98 could return at the intersection of Mildred Avenue. East of there, the road climbs a slight hill to cross a grade crossing with the CSX Brooksville Subdivision, then climbs a much steeper hill flanked by deep storm channels. Here the road is residential to the north and serves as the backyard of businesses along westbound US 41/US 98/SR 50A until it encounters Brooksville City Hall on the northwest corner of CR 445 (Howell Avenue). On the opposite corner is the headquarters for the Hernando County Public Library. From there the road becomes East Fort Dade Avenue and descends along a hill that's somewhat less steep than the one that it climbed to reach CR 445, passing by sites such as a local park, the Main Post Office and the American Legion Hall. From there, the surroundings become much more residential. The bottom of this hill is at a four-way stop intersection with Bell Avenue, and the road climbs another hill reaching the top at May Avenue. As it descends once again, it serves as the backyard of the May-Stringer House until reaching Saxon Avenue then hits the bottom of that hill in a wooded area before encountering another blinker light intersection with US 41.

East of US US 41, CR 484 becomes Mondon Hill Road, and an official designated route once again. Mondon Hill Road begins mainly residential with some small horse farms, and later passes Old Jasmine Road, and later the shared intersection of Jasmine Drive and McIntyre Road before crossing under a power line right-of way on the grounds of the former Atlantic Coast Line Railroad line that is today the "Good Neighbor Trail." Further east, the road enters another wooded area and curves around a former sand mine. Once it resumes its previous trajectory, the road runs mostly through farmland, including sections on a high embankment east of Weatherly Road, which includes intersections with Preston Road on the north side and W.P.A. Road on the south. The embankments end as the road climbs a slight hill west of Cooper Terrace, with more residencies along the south side but suddenly climbs another steep hill while it curves to the south. The road climbs another hill, but as it descends it passes by a local Hernando County Firehouse. Continuing to pass more farmland, the road eventually enters Hill 'n Dale, where in the vicinity of the intersection with Bertram Road it curves to the right around a former section of the road and back to the left before finally terminating at US 98/SR 50 and the northern terminus of CR 541.

== County Road 485 ==
Cobb Road
- Location: Brooksville-Willow Prairie Lake

County Road 485 is Cobb Road, which runs south to north and serves double-duty as a segment of U.S. Truck Route 98. It was originally designated as SR 485.

=== Route description ===
The route begins at the intersection of State Road 50 and the western terminus of State Road 50A. From that intersection it narrows down to two lanes, as it approaches a four-way stop intersection and accompanying red blinker-lights with CR 484 (West Ford Dade Avenue). Two old sections of Cobb Road used to exist. One is to the right north of CR 484 (Old Cobb Road), and the other is a mining road that runs northwest (Camp Mine Road) from the intersection with Yontz Road (Former County Road 485B) (see below), to an isolated section of County Road 476 (Lake Lindsey Road) in Stafford. In that area, the road widens to accommodate left-turn lanes and a southbound turn lane from the mining road entrance, which not only includes the former section of Cobb Road, but another mining road heading west from Yontz Road. Crossing the railroad tracks after the intersection with Yontz Road, the road winds through a rural field between a mining area and a hilly region of northern Hernando County. The road widens for another left turn lane, this time at the entrance to the D.S. Parrott Middle School, and the Ernie Wever Youth Park. Curving to the northeast one last time, the road finally ends at US 98 south of the Willow Prairie Lake area. Truck Weigh Stations exist just west of the northern terminus of Truck US 98 on the right of way of a former railroad crossing.

=== County Road 485B ===
Yontz Road
- Location: Brooksville

County Road 485B is Yontz Road a former county road north of Brooksville, Florida. It runs from CR 485 across from an entrance to a cement mine through US 98. At one time it continued along Yontz Road to CR 445, and was formerly designated as SR 485B

== County Road 491 ==
Citrus Way
- Location: Brooksville-North of Brooksville

County Road 491 is Citrus Way, a bi-county south to north road that begins at CR 484 near Spring Hill and ends at the Hernando-Citrus County Line. It was once former SR 491 and overlaps CR 476 between two different segments, one at Centralia Boulevard, and the other at Lake Lindsey Road.

=== Route description ===
CR 491 begins at CR 484 near Spring Hill where it passes over a mining bridge. From there it curves northwest and runs between a large sand mine on the east side, and some farmland being sought out by the mining company on the west side. By the time the route reaches a dirt road named Peach Orchard Road, the farmland is replaced by a swath of forest, and at Bailey Hill Road it encounters a preserve area. After the intersection with Kensington Road CR 491 curves from the northwest to the northeast. At the eastern terminus of Centralia Boulevard, CR 476 turns northeast onto an overlap with CR 491, then curves directly to the east between the mining lands of northern Hernando County. After CR 476/491 makes a sharp turn to the north east of a power line right-of-way, CR 476 breaks away at Lake Lindsey Road, which heads straight east once again, while CR 491 continues north along Citrus Way. After crossing the CSX Brooksville Subdivision, which contains no crossing gates, more farmland can be found on the east side, and on the opposite side, it passes by the Saint Stanislaus Catholic Church and Cemetery, as well as some local residencies. The farmland begins to appear on the opposite side of the road as well before it climbs a hill as it approaches a roundabout (formerly a blinker-light intersection) with U.S. Route 98 at an intersection once known as Deschamps Corner. The opposite side of this corner includes the Hernando County Rock Cannery and former library branch.

After US 98, the road climbs a hill and passes the occasional ranch property. Descending from that hill and then approaching another, the road makes some slight reverse curves to the left and then descends as it makes a sharper northwest curve before the intersection with Parsons Road (former CR 491) and Thompson's Loop, and then curves back straight north at a trailhead for the Withlacoochee State Forest. Right after a plot of farmland ends on the right, the Hebron Baptist Church can be found on the left. the road climbs a slight hill, and as it descends, the state forest territory switches from the west side to the east, and farmland takes up the west side before the road finally crosses the Hernando-Citrus County Line.

=== County Road 491A ===
Parsons Road, Brittle Road
- Location: Stafford

County Road 491A is a former county road consisting of south to north Brittle Road and east to west Parsons Road. It was a suffixed alternate of CR 491 and ran from US 98 to CR 491 in Stafford. The road was formerly designated as SR 491A, and may have included Annutalaga Avenue which leads to CR 476.

== County Road 493 ==
Sunshine Grove Road
- Location: Brooksville-Royal Highlands

County Road 493 is entirely Sunshine Grove Road, although it briefly runs concurrent with a local street named Hexam Road. It runs from State Road 50 at the west end of Twin Dolphin Road on the border of Spring Hill and unincorporated Brooksville to County Road 476 (Centralia Road) in an area known as Royal Highlands.

Sunshine Grove Road is a four-lane divided highway from SR 50 to north of Ken Austin Parkway and Star Road, where it suddenly become two lanes. It also runs parallel to a wide power line right-of-way along the east side from SR 50 to Hexam Road. The route joins Hexam Road westbound for a short distance then returns northbound through mixed agricultural zoning, beginning with a series of pigeon lofts. Later it makes a northeastern curve beneath the previously mentions power line right-of-way and runs along the east side of it for the first time before terminating at CR 476.

== County Road 495 ==
Pine Island Drive
- Location: Bayport-Pine Island

County Road 495 is entirely Pine Island Drive It runs from CR 550 in Bayport to Alfred McKethan/Pine Island Park in Pine Island. The road was once a former segment of SR 595 Though another CR 495 exists in nearby Citrus County, Hernando CR 495 has no connection to that route.

The route begins at curved section of CR 550 at the corner of a seafood restaurant in Bayport within the swamps of southern Hernando County, running straight northwest. It is entirely two lanes wide and most of the road has no shoulders, although recreational fisherman have been known to park on the embankment illegally. After one intersection nearby with Bayou Drive, the road runs over two culverts, and curves slightly to the left before running over two more, and curving to the left again. After the fifth culvert, the road encounters one house and makes a sharp turn towards the southwest, where it crosses over its first bridge. The second bridge is where it enters Pine Island itself, and then makes another sharp turn to the south. Winding through Pine Island, and encountering numerous private roads and beach houses, the road terminates at the entrance to Alfred McKethan/Pine Island Park.

== County Road 541 ==
Spring Lake Highway
- Location: Dixie-Hill 'n Dale

County Road 541 is Spring Lake Highway, a former segment of State Road 41 and later County Road 41. It begins at the Pasco County line as a continuation of County Road 41, as it moves up and down the hills of eastern Hernando County, through orange groves, former orange groves, and hay farms. The road serves as the eastern terminus of CR 576 (Hayman Road, formerly CR 420) and CR 572 (Powell Road) in Spring Lake. North of CR 572, one major orange grove remains intact. It ends at US 98/SR 50 in Hill 'n Dale, where it leads to a realigned section of County Road 484.

== County Road 550 ==
Cortez Boulevard
- Location: Bayport Park-Weeki Wachee

County Road 550 is a former segment and coastal spur of SR 50. It runs from the Gulf of Mexico in Bayport to US 19 in Weeki Wachee, where it becomes SR 50. Like its parent route, it is signed east–west, and is named Cortez Boulevard. It was also a former segment of SR 50 itself.

County Road 550 begins at Bayport Park heading east, then later curves to the northeast until it approaches a seafood restaurant on the southwest corner of an intersection with CR 495, only to turn back east again over the tidal swamps of the coast, which are owned by the Chassahowitzka National Wildlife Refuge. Curving southeast, the road passes by a fishing encampment and another restaurant before intersecting with CR 597 north of Weeki Wachee Gardens. From there, a sparse residential area can be found, but after more woods, a semi-commercial area turns up. The road finally curves to the east before approaching preserved land near Weeki Wachee Springs and terminates at the intersection of US 19 and SR 50.

== County Road 570 ==
Wiscon Road
- Location: Wiscon-South of Brooksville

County Road 570 is Wiscon Road from SR 50 east of Spring Hill to US 41 in Brooksville.

=== Route description ===
County Road 570 begins at SR 50 heading east, but only to and from the eastbound lane east of Suncoast Parkway. A connection to and from westbound SR 50 is available at nearby Winter Street. This section contains includes a church and an office for the Hernando County Utilities Department. From there, the surroundings of the road are almost entirely residential, and as it dips down into a hill, it serves as the southwestern terminus of West Fort Dade Avenue (CR 484).

East of California Street (CR 583), the road dips down again and around a low-lying area that's often at risk of flooding and then returns to a safe level. After passing the backyard of Brooksville General Hospital across the street from the Saint James Missionary Baptist Church and a horse farm, the road moves over some bridges over dry creeks. Between a Lowe's franchise and a Wal-Mart Super Center, CR 570 finally ends at US 41.

== County Road 572 ==
Elgin Boulevard, Powell Road
- Location: Spring Hill-Spring Lake

County Road 572 is Elgin Boulevard from County Road 589 (Deltona Boulevard) to CR 585 (Barclay Avenue), and Powell Road from CR 585 to CR 541 in Spring Lake. The route was formerly designated as SR 572

=== Route description ===
Elgin Boulevard begins as a suburban residential street at Freeport Drive, one of a series of loop streets within Spring Hill. The Hernando County Road 572 designation begins at Deltona Boulevard (CR 589). The road encounters Freeport Drive again, but that road becomes a dead end street south of Elgin. East of Nardello Avenue most streets north of CR 572 run for at least one block before becoming dead end streets along the south side of the Sand Hill Scout Reservation. Between Keysville Avenue and Gifford Drive, it crosses a power line right-of-way. The next intersection is Landover Boulevard, another loop street within Spring Hill. Just after the second intersection with Gifford Drive, it passes by the Holy Trinity Orthodox Church on the southwest corner of Elwood Road. Curving slightly to the southeast just before Orton Avenue and intersecting Sheffield Drive, the surroundings become less flat and the forestry becomes thinner, but still suburban nevertheless. The road becomes a four-lane divided highway at Mariner Boulevard (CR 587). The newly widened road continues its hilly suburban landscape even through the second intersection with Landover Boulevard, which unlike the previous intersection contains some traffic signals, as previously seen at Mariner Boulevard. After crossing under the much larger Progress Energy Power Line, the road curves more towards the southeast around some gated communities such as Sand Ridge and Sterling Hills, and passes the Challenger K8 School of Science and Mathematics. After the north gate of Pristine Place, the road curves back to the east again.

Elgin Boulevard ends at Barclay Avenue (CR 585) but CR 572 continues onto Powell Road, which turns into a two-lane undivided highway at Mallard Lake Drive, then crosses the bicycle path along Suncoast Parkway. The bridge over the parkway has no access to or from Powell Road. The suburban surroundings gradually begin to diminish, but don't completely disappear until after it approaches the Hernando County school complex which includes Chocachatti Elementary School on the southwest corner of California Street (CR 583). East of there, the surroundings are entirely rural, as it runs between some cattle and former chicken farms, as well as a former flower field. Powell Road takes a slight descent before it crosses over a dry riverbed just before the intersection with US 41. East of US 41, the route passes some entrances to the Imperial Estates trailer park, then a culvert over another dry river bed. The road takes a curve to the southeast before it encounters an at-grade crossing with the CSX Brooksville Subdivision, and then makes a sharp turn to the east. The trajectory doesn't last though, as it curves slightly to the southeast before the intersection with Rackley Road, and then straightens out to the east again before intersecting with Endsley Road, only to turn slightly to the northeast, and pass a small industrial park. Curving more towards the northeast than before, the road descends into a valley where it encounters Culbreath Road (Hernando CR 581) which includes an east to south right-turn ramp, and shares a multiplex with that route as it climbs a hill. After a few intersections with private roads mostly to the south in a residential area, County Road 581 branches off to the north onto Emerson Road towards Brooksville at a wye intersection, while CR 571 curves to the east. Somewhere after the intersection with Nancy Creek Bouleavard, it passes by a tree farm on the north side then turns slightly to the northeast at the intersection of two farm roads until it encounters the intersection with Griffin Road and Brush Road where it turns straight east again. Passing through more tree farms with occasional open land, the road descends into another valley where it encounters the intersection with Cedar Lane and Goldsmith Road, then climbs a hill again.

Once it finishes climbing the aforementioned hill, it encounters more farm and ranch land as it enters Spring Lake, where it makes a sharp curve to the right and heads south. Along the way it has an intersection with Old Spring Lake Road, where a radio tower can be scene. From there it runs down another hill which is slightly more suburban in its appearance and makes a sharp curve to the left where it climbs back up another hill. This suburbanized segment ends at the intersection of Neff Lake Road (former CR 577). East of there is another mix of residential and agricultural zoning, although the suburban aspects are further emphasized by the intersection with Appalachian Drive, the south end of which is the northern gateway to the Mountain View deed restricted community. Hernando County Road 572 as well as Powell Road ends at Spring Lake Drive (CR 541) in Spring Lake, and contains signs giving directing motorists towards I-75 either northbound to Exit 301 on US 98/SR 50, or southbound to Exit 293 along Pasco County Road 41.

== County Road 574 ==
Spring Hill Drive
- Location: Spring Hill-Garden Grove

County Road 574 is entirely Spring Hill Drive, and entirely four lanes wide whether divided or not. It runs from US 19 at a spur of the eastern terminus of County Road 595 to US 41 in Garden Grove.

== County Road 575 ==
Burwell Road
- Location: Ridge Manor

County Road 575 is Burwell Road, a county extension of State Road 575. As the easternmost south to north route in Hernando County, the road runs from the Pasco-Hernando County Line at the bridge over the Withlacoochee River to State Road 50 in Ridge Manor. It was also once a former segment of SR 575 itself.

== County Road 576 ==
Ayers Road, Hayman Road
- Location: Masaryktown-Spring Lake

County Road 576 is Ayers Road from CR 578 to CR 581 and Hayman Road from CR 581 to CR 541. The route was formerly known as SR 420 and later County Road 420.

=== Route description ===
County Road 576 begins in northern Masaryktown, at CR 578 east of the Suncoast Parkway. It curves north through some developments then turns east towards US 41. Immediately after this it crosses the CSX Brooksville Subdivision. From there, the road runs between Old Ayers Road and some farmland, which is also used as the headwaters of a SWFMD canal leading to Crews Lake. Though it continues to pass through some local farmland and thinned out forests, it also encounters some small lakes near the road. Halfway through its journey, the roadbed to a second former section of Ayers Road can be found in front of some farmland and a pond that the current section winds around. Resuming its trajectory near a private farm road named Chaswell Lane, the surroundings consist mainly of tree-lined horse farms, rather than the open fields near Masaryktown. Just after crossing a culvert over a creek leading from Sparkman Lake, the road descends slightly, and the eastbound lane encounters rumble strips as Ayers Road ends at a blinker-light intersection with CR 581.

CR 576 continues onto Hayman Road and begins climbing a hill, that gradually becomes steeper before leveling off, where it makes a slight curve to the northeast around some farmland across from the intersection with Batten Road, that appears to be a former section of the road. The road turns back east again before the intersection with a dirt road named Hancock Lake Drive. After an intersection with a pair of unnamed farm roads, the grade descends slightly before making the first of a series of sharp turns beginning at a wye intersection with Dan Brown Hill Road, which runs south as CR 576 turns north. Two private named farm roads run west from Hayman Road, before it has another wye intersection with a third private farm road, and turns back east again. A third turn takes the road to the north almost immediately after the previous turn, and evidence of former segments of the road can be found at the beginning and end of this curve. One other farm road runs west before the fourth sharp turn which contains a wye driveway at the beginning of the curve, and an intersection with a private road named Valley Ridge Lane at the end of it. Most farm roads run north of the road at this point, including the named Fair Fortune Lane and Rose Terrace Path, which run parallel to each other. One last curve is encountered to the north, and then a sharp curve to the northeast as it runs down a hill, before the final curve to the east. Somewhere along these last curves, the road enters the southern edges of Spring Lake, where the road ascends onto a slight hill before finally terminating at Spring Lake Highway (CR 541). An unnamed farm road continues eastward from this intersection for somewhere less than a mile.

== County Road 577 ==
Neff Lake Road, Olympia Drive
- Location: Spring Lake

County Road 577 was Neff Lake Road from CR 572 to Olympia Road, and Olympia Road from Neff Lake Road to US 98/SR 50 west of the Rolling Acres-Hill 'n Dale area. The route was originally known as former SR 577

=== Route description ===
Neff Lake Road begins at the northeast corner of the lake the road was named after and runs straight north. The segment that contained the county designation began at CR 572 in Spring Lake and climbed a hill, briefly has a conjunction with Old Spring Lake Road. After the second intersection with Old Spring Lake Road, former CR 577 takes a steep descent onto a bridge over a small creek. The rest of the route passes by farmlands, forests and various dead end street and dirt roads. CR 577 ran beneath some power lines at the intersection of Lanark Road, which also contains a tree trimming business specializing in removing tree branches from power lines.

Neff Lake Road ends at Olympia Road. Southeast of Neff Lake Road, Olympia Road runs towards CR 541 as an unmarked local street. CR 577 followed Olympia Road northwest into its northern terminus at U98/SR 50, across the street from a recreational vehicle campground and a local gas station/convenience store.

== County Road 578 ==
County Line Road
- Location: Spring Hill-Masaryktown

County Road 578 is a west to east route that runs along the Hernando-Pasco County Line from US 19 to US 41, and it aptly named "County Line Road." The road was at one time signed as SR 578.

== County Road 581 ==
Culbreath Road Powell Road Emerson Road
- Location: Darby-Brooksville

County Road 581 is a continuation of northern County Road 581 from Pasco County, that runs as far north as Brooksville. It was formerly designated as SR 581 along Culbreath Road and Mitchell Road, and as SR 571 along Emerson Road. It also once included the current CR 481.

As with the segment in Pasco County, CR 581 continues to run through farmland, but also passes by an Eckerd Youth Camp. Later it encounters a blinker-light intersection with CR 576, where Ayer's Road becomes Hayman Road, and then passes a recreational vehicle campground. The route briefly merges with CR 572 (Powell Road) running east and then turns north again at a wye intersection, where it runs up and down some hills south of Brooksville. After crossing the intersection with SR 50, the road finally terminates at SR 50A.

=== County Road 581A ===
Summit Street
- Location: Brooksville

County Road 581A was Summit Street (now Martin Luther King Junior Boulevard) in Brooksville. Due to the loss of the connection with CR 581, it is no longer designated a county route. The route was former SR 581A.

== County Road 583 ==
California Street
- Location: Spring Hill

County Road 583 runs from CR 574 near the Hernando County Airport to State Road 50. It is primarily two lanes wide except in school zones and at signalized intersections where left-turn lanes are installed.

== County Road 585 ==
Anderson Snow Road, Barclay Avenue
- Location: Spring Hill

County Road 585 is Anderson Snow Road from County Line Road (CR 578) west of Masaryktown to Spring Hill Drive (CR 574), and Barclay Avenue from Spring Hill Drive to State Road 50 across from the front entrance to Brookridge.

Anderson Snow Road was realigned near County Line Road during the construction of Suncoast Parkway. A widening project between Spring Hill Drive and Elgin Boulevard/Powell Road took place during the 2000s.

== County Road 587 ==
Mariner Boulevard
- Location: Spring Hill

County Road 587 is Mariner Boulevard, but only from County Road 578 (County Line Road) to State Road 50. It is entirely in Spring Hill, and is four lanes wide whether the road is divided or not.

=== Route description ===
CR 587 begins as a divided highway that still needs left turn lanes in the median at County Line Road in the Seven Hills section of Spring Hill, and leaves that section just south of the first intersection with Linden Boulevard, one of a series of loop streets within Spring Hill. The first intersection with another marked county road is with CR 574 (Spring Hill Drive). After the second intersection with Linden Drive it passes a church and then the Frank W. Springstead High School, and encounters another one of the Spring Hill area loops streets, this time Landover Boulevard. North of there, the mostly residential surroundings give way to commercial ones and it serves as the eastern terminus of Northcliffe Boulevard. Returning to a primarily residential area, it climbs a slight hill, then descends between a firehouse and a church before making a slight reverse curve as it approaches CR 572 (Elgin Boulevard).

Curving slightly to the northwest as it passes through three more blocks, it briefly divides as it runs between an elementary school on the west side and a church on the east side. The road curves to the left again as it climbs yet another hill and then takes a huge drop before approaching another intersection with Landover Boulevard.

County Road 587 ends at SR 50, but Mariner Boulevard continues to the north running between two shopping centers along SR 50 as a two-lane road with left-turn provisions. After the last driveways to the shopping centers, those left turn lane provisions end as the road finally ends at Jacqueline Road.

== County Road 589 ==
Deltona Boulevard
- Location: Spring Hill-Weeki Wachee

County Road 589 is Deltona Boulevard and runs through Spring Hill from County Road 574 (Spring Hill Road) to State Road 50 in Weeki Wachee.

== County Road 595 ==
Osawaw Boulevard
- Location: Aripeka-Spring Hill

County Road 595 is a bi-county extension of State Road 595 It runs from the Pasco-Hernando County Line within Aripeka to US 19 in Spring Hill. The road was once a former segment of SR 595

=== Route description ===
Hernando CR 595 begins at the South Palm Island Bridge in Aripeka, where the street name changes from Aripeka Road to Osowaw Boulevard. Palm Island contains only one other street, specifically Gulf Drive. After the North Palm Island Bridge, the road eventually enters the marshlands of southwestern Hernando County. From there it winds more towards the east, leaving the marshlands and entering more wooded surroundings, encountering some local campgrounds and a partial wye intersection with CR 597, one of two gateways to Hernando Beach. Northeast of there, the road curves more towards the east as it passes by a private school on the southwest corner of the entrance to the Forest Glen community, and across from there an entrance to the Weeki Wachee Preserve. At the entrance to a local county landfill, Osowaw Boulevard makes a sharp turn to the right and runs southeast, only to end at the intersection of US 19 and CR 574 to meet the second gateway to Hernando Beach. A former segment of the road, named Tarpon Road leads only to and from a wye intersection at the southbound lanes of US 19.

== County Road 597 ==
Shoal Line Boulevard
- Location: Hernando Beach-East of Bayport

County Road 597 is Shoal Line Boulevard, and is the main road through Hernando Beach, spanning from CR 595 to CR 550 east of Bayport. The road was once a former segment of SR 595

=== Route description ===
CR 597 begins on the south side of Hernando Beach with a Triangle Park intersection with a decorative gateway at CR 595, one of two such gateways to Hernando Beach. The road runs through some land owned by the Weeki Wachee Preserve, which includes part of a housing development named Hernando Beach, which has more than 2,000 homes in the combined three sections, North, Mid, and South. Entering the business village of Hernando Beach, you will recognize the shrimp docks, local marinas, bait/tackle shops as well as nearly a dozen restaurants. Hernando Beach offers fishing charters, dinner boat cruises, kayak rentals, a motel including The Captain's House, and several Airbnb's. The road then curves to the east before the intersection of Calienta Street as it passes a United States Coast Guard station, and an entrance to the Weeki Wachee Preserve across from Petite Lane. As the road approaches the marshlands of northwestern Hernando County, it passes a nearby church. Evidence of former swampland residencies line the road before it eventually runs between Linda Pedersen Park and then Jenkins Creek Park before crossing a bridge over the creek that park was named for.

The road nearly leaves the swamp as it enters Weeki Wachee Gardens flanked by canals on both sides of the road with a housing development on the west side and random local businesses on the east side before it encounters Rodgers Park on the northeast corner of a bridge over the Weeki Wachee River. One restaurant, and a kayak shop behind it, along with a small motel can be found between that bridge and Darlene Street before the surroundings become more residential, at least on the east side. The road curves to the east and makes a sharp turn to the north at a street leading to a Christian Summer Camp. North of Weeki Wachee Gardens, the road runs straight north through one last wooded area with only a dirt road intersection leading to a pair of isolated residential communities on Salt Creek and Mud Creek before finally terminating at CR 550, somewhere east of Bayport.
