= Pine Island, Hernando County, Florida =

- Census-designated place
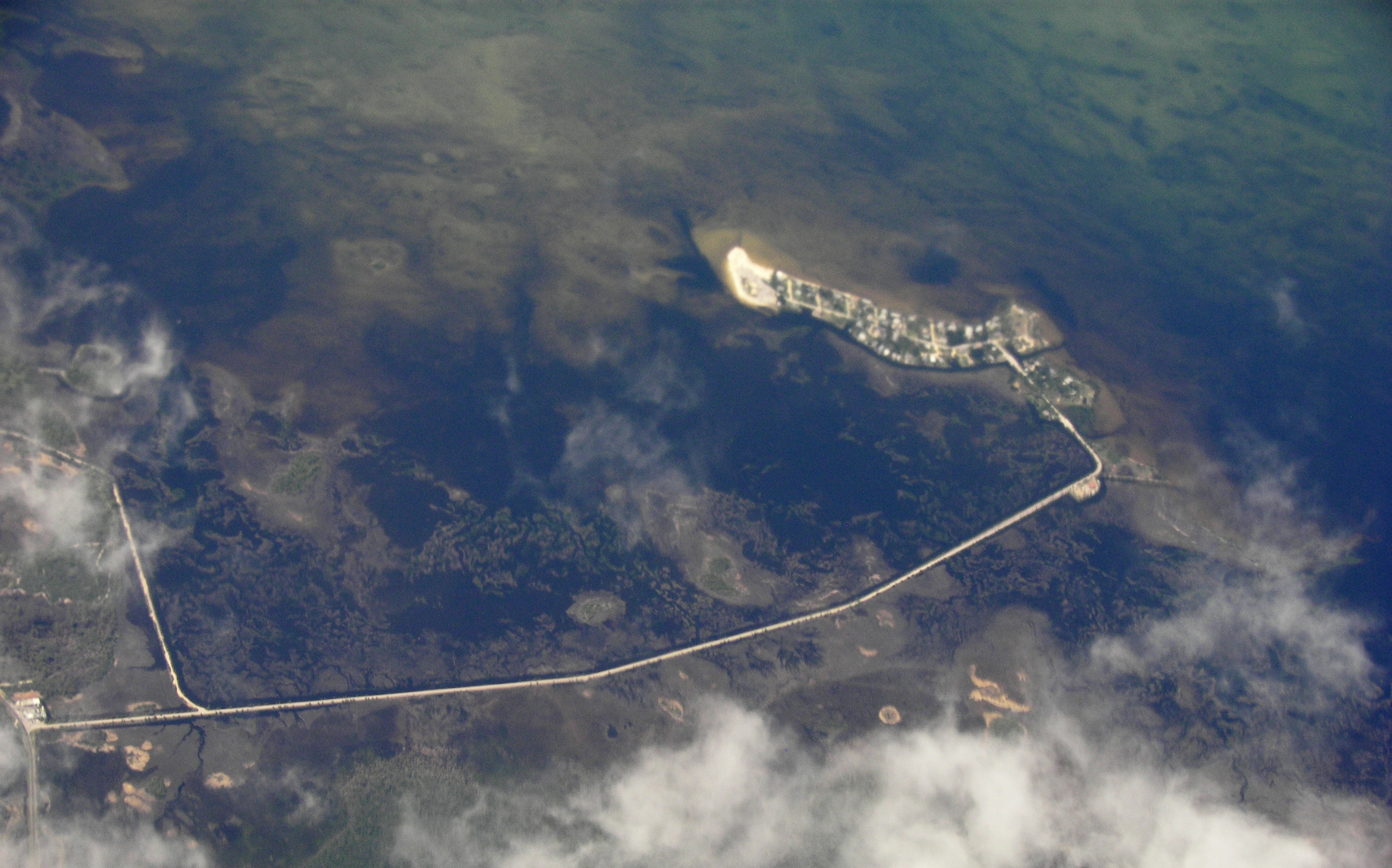
- Aerial view of Pine Island and Pine Island Drive

- Location in Hernando County and the state of Florida
- Coordinates: 28°34′22″N 82°39′17″W
- Country: United States
- State: Florida
- County: Hernando

Area
  - Total: 0.077 sq mi (0.20 km^{2})
  - Land: 0.066 sq mi (0.17 km^{2})
  - Water: 0.015 sq mi (0.04 km^{2})
- Elevation: 3 ft (0.91 m)

Population (2020)
  - Total: 62
  - Density: 970.2/sq mi (374.61/km^{2})
- Time zone: UTC-5 (Eastern (EST))
  - Summer (DST): UTC-4 (EDT)
- FIPS code: 12-56840
- GNIS feature ID: 2403412

Pine Island is an unincorporated community and census-designated place (CDP) in Hernando County, Florida, United States. The population was 64 at the 2010 census, unchanged from the 2000 census.

Pine Island Park requires paid parking year-round, with fees set at $5 per vehicle before 5:00 p.m. and $2 per vehicle after 5:00 p.m. The park is open daily from 8:00 a.m. until sunset, according to Hernando County Parks & Recreation.

== Geography ==
Pine Island is located in western Hernando County on the island of the same name on the Gulf of Mexico. It forms the northern edge of Rock Island Bay, which lies between Pine Island and Bayport. Pine Island Drive is the sole road access to the Pine Island community; via Pine Island Drive and Cortez Boulevard it is 7 miles (11 km) southeast to U.S. Route 19 and State Road 50 at Weeki Wachee.

According to the United States Census Bureau, the CDP has a total area of 0.1 square miles (0.26 km^{2}), all land.

Pine Island Park (also known as Alfred McKethan Park) is a 3-acre (12,000 m^{2}) area on the Gulf of Mexico at 10800 Pine Island Drive that includes a swimming beach and swimming area, picnic tables, shelters, barbecue grills, observation point, volleyball court, playground and concession stand.

=== Storm Impact ===
Pine Island has experienced multiple weather-related closures and coastal flooding events over the years due to its location on the Gulf of Mexico. In June 2020, Hernando County temporarily closed Alfred McKethan/Pine Island Park as a precaution in response to a forecasted storm surge of two to four feet above ground level, with high-tide flooding expected overnight.

In August 2023, Pine Island experienced significant coastal flooding during Hurricane Idalia, when storm surge overtopped portions of Pine Island Drive and temporarily restricted access to the community. The beach park closed for cleanup and safety inspections before reopening to the public in early September.

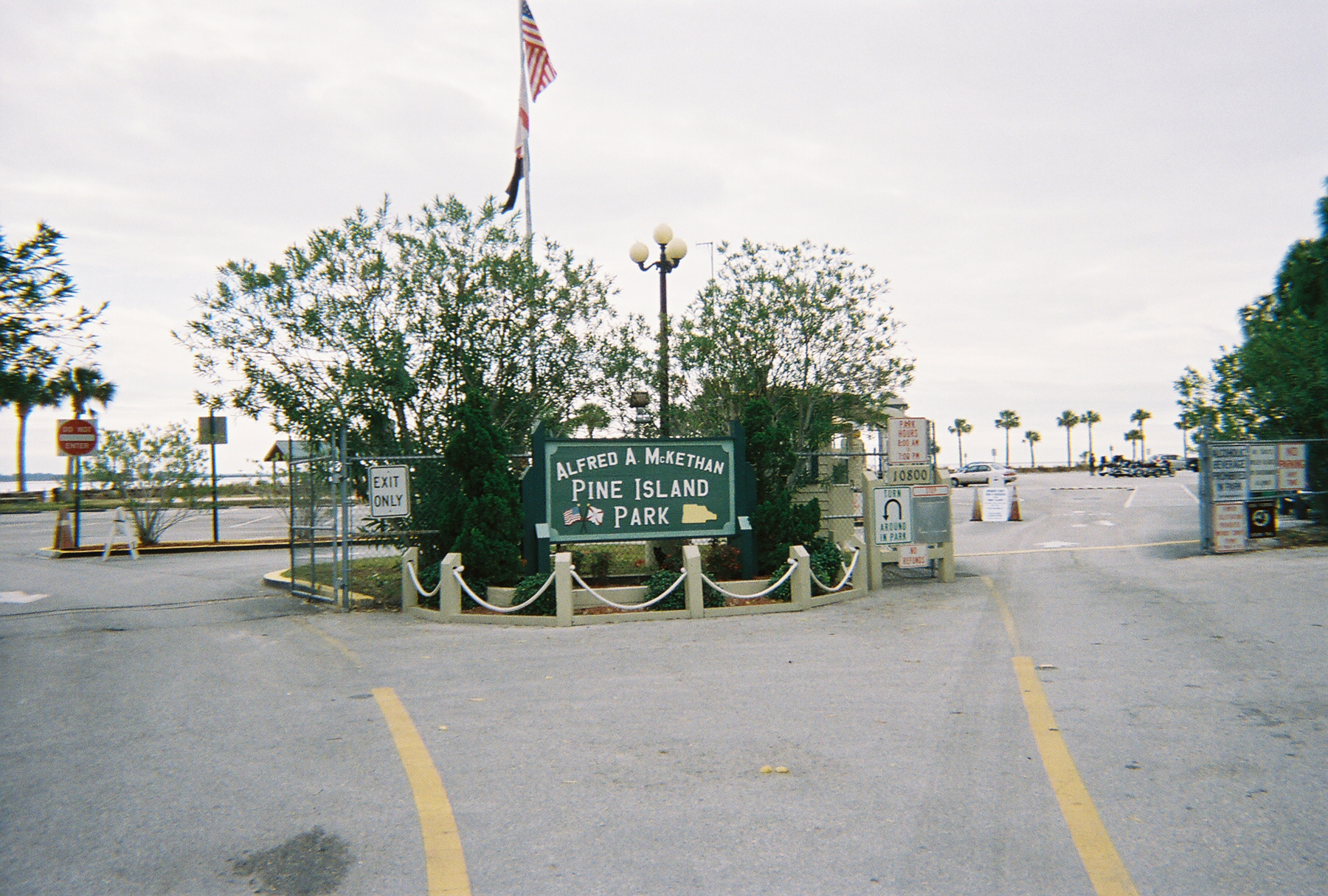
Pine Island Beach Park at the north end of County Road 495

== Demographics ==
Historical population
Census	Pop.	Note	%±
2020	62		—
U.S. Decennial Census

As of the census of 2000, there were 64 people, 16 households, and 20 families residing in the CDP. The population density was 945.7 inhabitants per square mile (365.1/km^{2}). There were 45 housing units at an average density of 664.9 per square mile (256.7/km^{2}). The racial makeup of the CDP was 87.50% White, 9.38% African-American, 1.56% Pacific Islander, and 1.56% from two or more races. Hispanic or Latino of any race were 1.56% of the population.

There were 29 households, out of which 20.7% had children under the age of 18 living with them, 48.3% were married couples living together, 20.7% had a female householder with no husband present, and 31.0% were non-families. 24.1% of all households were made up of individuals, and 3.4% had someone living alone who was 65 years of age or older. The average household size was 2.21 and the average family size was 2.50.

In the CDP, the population was spread out, with 15.6% under the age of 18, 9.4% from 18 to 24, 23.4% from 25 to 44, 34.4% from 45 to 64, and 17.2% who were 65 years of age or older. The median age was 46 years. For every 100 females, there were 93.9 males. For every 100 females age 18 and over, there were 80.0 males.

The median income for a household in the CDP was $40,000, and the median income for a family was $42,708. Males had a median income of $0 versus $0 for females. The per capita income for the CDP was $17,927. There were no families and 20.0% of the population living below the poverty line, including no under eighteens and 25.0% of those over 64.
