= Garden Grove =

There are at least three places in the United States named Garden Grove:

- Garden Grove, California
- Garden Grove, Iowa
- Garden Grove, Florida

Garden Grove could also refer to:

- "Garden Grove", song by Sublime (band), named after Garden Grove, California
