= Annutteliga Hammock =

Park and preserve in Florida, United States

Coordinates: 28.6436°N 82.4742°W

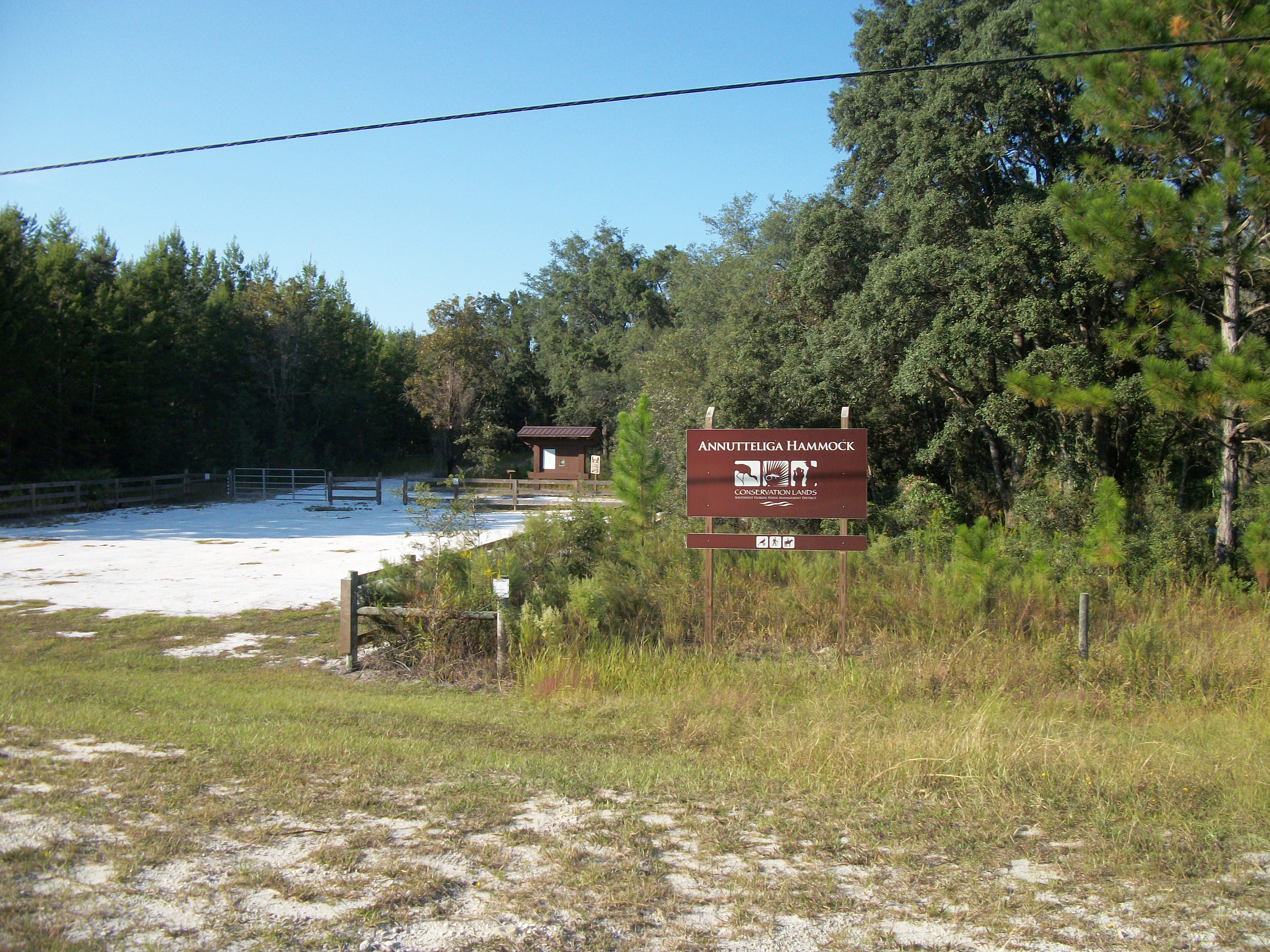
Sign for the Annutteliga Hammock on CR 476.

Annutteliga Hammock is a 570-acre (2.3 km^{2}) park and preserve in Weeki Wachee, Florida, Hernando County, Florida's the Brooksville Ridge and protects groundwater recharge. It connects with the Chassahowitzka Wildlife Management Area and offers trails for hiking and horseback riding. It is located at 11019 Centralia Road.
