= Weeki Wachee Gardens, Florida =

- Census-designated place
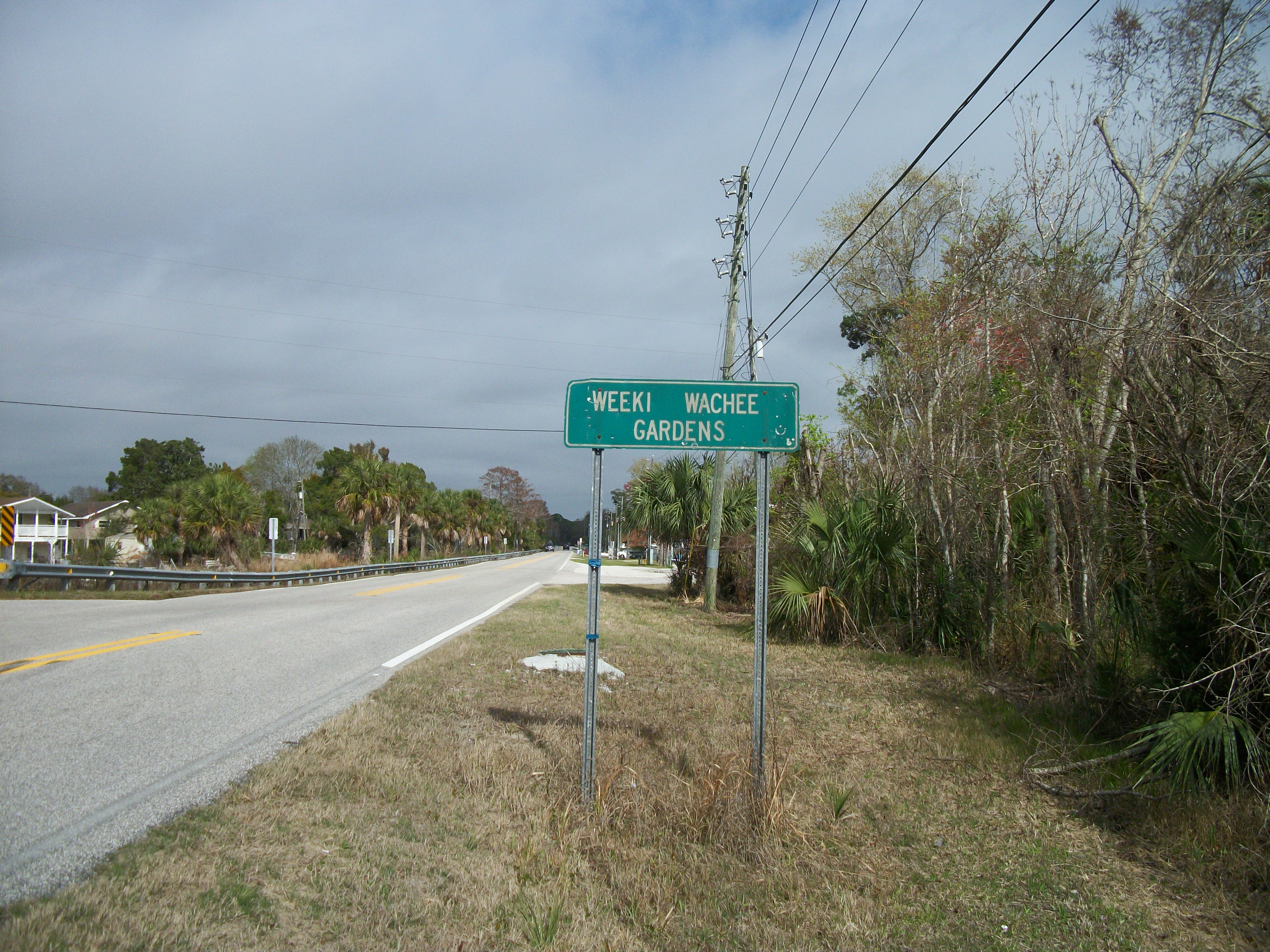
- County Road 597 entering Weeki Wachee Gardens

- Location in Hernando County and the state of Florida
- Coordinates: 28°32′12″N 82°37′29″W
- Country: United States
- State: Florida
- County: Hernando

Area
  - Total: 1.41 sq mi (3.64 km^{2})
  - Land: 1.25 sq mi (3.25 km^{2})
  - Water: 0.15 sq mi (0.40 km^{2})
- Elevation: 3 ft (0.91 m)

Population (2020)
  - Total: 1,138
  - Density: 907.6/sq mi (350.44/km^{2})
- Time zone: UTC-5 (Eastern (EST))
  - Summer (DST): UTC-4 (EDT)
- ZIP code: 34607
- Area code: 352
- FIPS code: 12-75641
- GNIS feature ID: 2402992

Weeki Wachee Gardens is a census-designated place (CDP) in Hernando County, Florida, United States. As of the 2020 census, Weeki Wachee Gardens had a population of 1,138.

== Geography ==
Weeki Wachee Gardens is located in western Hernando County along the Weeki Wachee River east of its mouth in the Gulf of Mexico. Shoal Line Boulevard is the main road through the community, leading northeast 1.5 miles (2.4 km) to Cortez Boulevard and south 4 miles (6 km) to Hernando Beach.

According to the United States Census Bureau, the CDP has a total area of 1.4 square miles (3.6 km^{2}), of which 1.3 square miles (3.3 km^{2}) are land and 0.1 square miles (0.3 km^{2}), or 9.60%, are water.

== Demographics ==
Historical population
Census	Pop.	Note	%±
2020	1,138		—
U.S. Decennial Census

=== 2020 census ===
As of the 2020 census, Weeki Wachee Gardens had a population of 1,138. The median age was 59.0 years. 11.6% of residents were under the age of 18 and 34.8% of residents were 65 years of age or older. For every 100 females there were 106.9 males, and for every 100 females age 18 and over there were 104.9 males age 18 and over.

0.0% of residents lived in urban areas, while 100.0% lived in rural areas.

There were 547 households in Weeki Wachee Gardens, of which 15.7% had children under the age of 18 living in them. Of all households, 47.2% were married-couple households, 23.0% were households with a male householder and no spouse or partner present, and 23.2% were households with a female householder and no spouse or partner present. About 33.0% of all households were made up of individuals and 19.2% had someone living alone who was 65 years of age or older.

There were 1,026 housing units, of which 46.7% were vacant. The homeowner vacancy rate was 4.2% and the rental vacancy rate was 29.1%.

Racial composition as of the 2020 census
Race	Number	Percent
White	1,047	92.0%
Black or African American	5	0.4%
American Indian and Alaska Native	5	0.4%
Asian	9	0.8%
Native Hawaiian and Other Pacific Islander	0	0.0%
Some other race	11	1.0%
Two or more races	61	5.4%
Hispanic or Latino (of any race)	42	3.7%

=== 2000 census ===
As of the 2000 census, there were 1,140 people, 556 households, and 361 families residing in the CDP. The population density was 822.6 inhabitants per square mile (317.6/km^{2}). There were 888 housing units at an average density of 640.8 per square mile (247.4/km^{2}). The racial makeup of the CDP was 97.98% White, 0.18% African American, 0.79% Native American, 0.09% Asian, and 0.96% from two or more races. Hispanic or Latino of any race were 1.14% of the population.

There were 556 households, out of which 13.3% had children under the age of 18 living with them, 56.7% were married couples living together, 5.0% had a female householder with no husband present, and 34.9% were non-families. 27.5% of all households were made up of individuals, and 10.4% had someone living alone who was 65 years of age or older. The average household size was 2.05 and the average family size was 2.39.

In the CDP, the population was spread out, with 12.2% under the age of 18, 3.7% from 18 to 24, 18.0% from 25 to 44, 39.5% from 45 to 64, and 26.7% who were 65 years of age or older. The median age was 54 years. For every 100 females, there were 108.4 males. For every 100 females age 18 and over, there were 106.0 males.

The median income for a household in the CDP was $29,826, and the median income for a family was $33,942. Males had a median income of $36,389 versus $19,583 for females. The per capita income for the CDP was $21,423. About 10.1% of families and 9.0% of the population were below the poverty line, including 25.9% of those under age 18 and 3.9% of those age 65 or over.
