= Spring Lake, Florida =

- Census-designated place
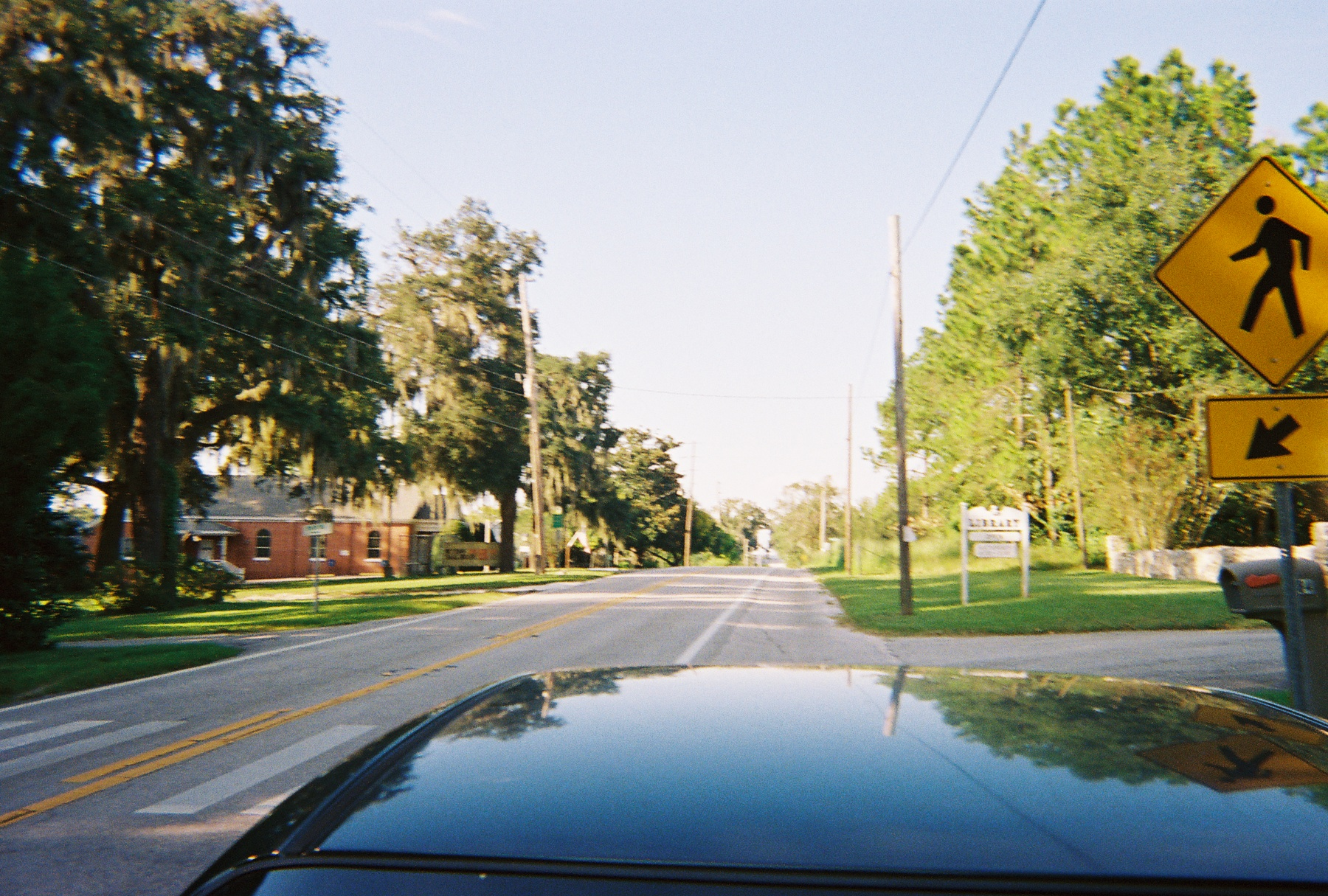
- A church and affiliated community center at the heart of Spring Lake

- Location in Hernando County and the state of Florida
- Coordinates: 28°29′58″N 82°18′08″W
- Country: United States
- State: Florida
- County: Hernando

Area
  - Total: 3.44 sq mi (8.92 km^{2})
  - Land: 3.33 sq mi (8.62 km^{2})
  - Water: 0.12 sq mi (0.30 km^{2})
- Elevation: 210 ft (64 m)

Population (2020)
  - Total: 465
  - Density: 139.7/sq mi (53.92/km^{2})
- Time zone: UTC-5 (Eastern (EST))
  - Summer (DST): UTC-4 (EDT)
- FIPS code: 12-68375
- GNIS feature ID: 2402889

Spring Lake is an unincorporated community and census-designated place (CDP) in Hernando County, Florida, United States. As of the 2020 census, Spring Lake had a population of 465.

== Geography ==
Spring Lake is located in eastern Hernando County. It is bordered to the north by Hill 'n Dale. It is 8 miles (13 km) southeast of Brooksville, the county seat.

Spring Lake contains rolling hills ranging in elevation from 120 ft to 280 ft.

According to the United States Census Bureau, the CDP has a total area of 3.4 square miles (8.9 km^{2}), of which 3.3 square miles (8.6 km^{2}) are land and 0.1 square miles (0.3 km^{2}), or 3.35%, are water.

== Demographics ==
Historical population
Census	Pop.	Note	%±
2020	465		—
U.S. Decennial Census

At the 2010 census, there were 458 people, 188 households and 149 families residing in the CDP. There were 211 total housing units. The racial makeup of the CDP was 96.9% White, 0.2% Black, 0.4% Native American, 1.3% Asian, 0.4% some other race, and 0.7% from two or more races. Hispanic or Latino of any race were 6.3% of the population.

There were 188 households, of which 25.5% had children under the age of 18 living with them, 64.9% were headed by married couples living together, 11.7% had a female householder with no husband present, and 20.7% were non-families. 17.0% of all households were made up of individuals, and 5.9% were someone living alone who was 65 years of age or older. The average household size was 2.44, and the average family size was 2.70.

18.1% of the population were under the age of 18, 6.7% were from 18 to 24, 17.7% were from 25 to 44, 37.4% were from 45 to 64, and 20.1% were 65 years of age or older. The median age was 49.5 years. For every 100 females, there were 97.4 males. For every 100 females age 18 and over, there were 100.5 males.

For the period 2011-15, the estimated median household income was $50,880 and the median family income was $55,950. The per capita income was $38,180. 9.7% of families and 11.5% of the population were living below the poverty line.
