= Bayport, Florida =

- Census-designated place
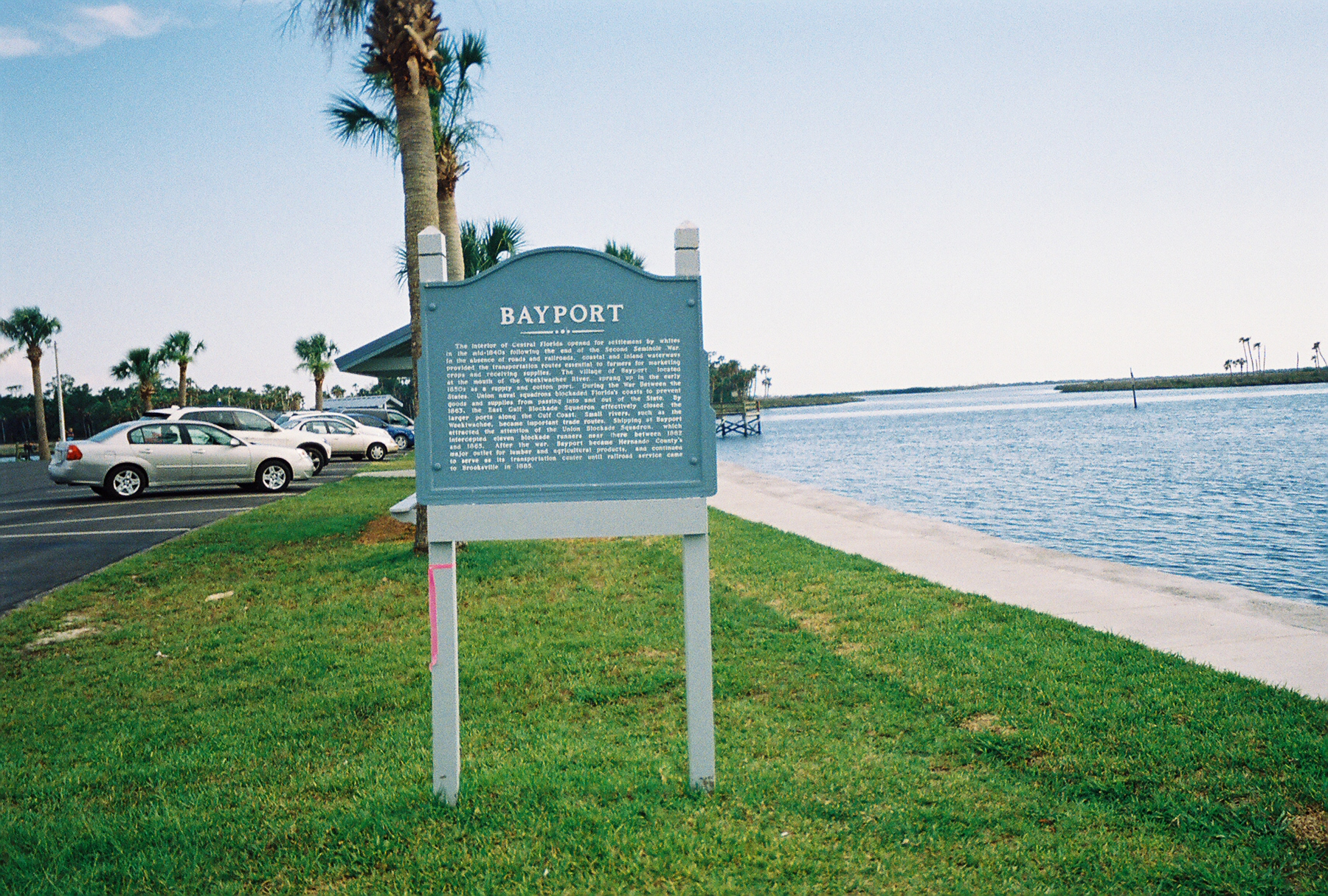
- Historic plaque in Bayport

- Location of Bayport in Hernando County, Florida.
- Coordinates: 28°32′49″N 82°38′44″W
- Country: United States
- State: Florida
- County: Hernando

Area
  - Total: 0.64 sq mi (1.67 km^{2})
  - Land: 0.58 sq mi (1.49 km^{2})
  - Water: 0.069 sq mi (0.18 km^{2})
- Elevation: 3 ft (0.91 m)

Population (2020)
  - Total: 45
  - Density: 78.3/sq mi (30.24/km^{2})
- Time zone: UTC-5 (Eastern (EST))
  - Summer (DST): UTC-4 (EDT)
- FIPS code: 12-04250
- GNIS feature ID: 2402671

Bayport is an unincorporated community and census-designated place (CDP) in Hernando County, Florida, United States. As of the 2020 census, Bayport had a population of 45.

== History ==
The village of Bayport, located at the mouth of the Weeki Wachee River, sprang up in the early 1850s as a supply and cotton port. It was originally spelled as Bay Port and briefly served as the county seat until it was moved to Brooksville in 1856. During the Civil War, Union naval squadrons blockaded Florida's coasts to prevent goods and supplies from passing into and out of the state. By 1863 the East Gulf Blockade Squadron had effectively closed the larger ports along the Gulf Coast. Small rivers, such as the Weeki Wachee, became important trade routes. Shipping at Bayport attracted the attention of the Union Blockade Squadron which intercepted eleven blockade runners near there between 1862 and 1865. Various skirmishes took place at Bayport between Union troops and the Confederate Home Guard during the course of the war. This included at least one raid by Union troops who had marched all the way north from Fort Myers. The Confederate cannon battery site can still be seen on the wooded point just north of the Bayport fishing pier at the mouth of the Weeki Wachee River.

After the war Bayport became Hernando County's major outlet for lumber and agricultural products, and continued to serve as its transportation center until railroad service came to Brooksville in 1885.

In the spring of 2008, Hernando County and the Southwest Florida Water Management District rebuilt Bayport's marina and park area.

== Geography ==
Bayport is located in western Hernando County along the Gulf of Mexico. Cortez Boulevard, the main road to the community, leads east 5 miles (8 km) to U.S. Route 19 at Weeki Wachee.

According to the United States Census Bureau, the CDP has a total area of 0.66 square miles (1.7 km^{2}), of which 0.58 square miles (1.5 km^{2}) are land and 0.1 square miles (0.2 km^{2}), or 10.77%, are water.

== Demographics ==
Historical population
| Census | Pop. | Note | %± |
|---|---|---|---|
| 2020 | 45 | | — |
U.S. Decennial Census

As of the census of 2000, there were 36 people, 16 households, and 10 families residing in the CDP. The population density was 54.3 inhabitants per square mile (21.0/km^{2}). There were 39 housing units at an average density of 58.8 per square mile (22.7/km^{2}). The racial makeup of the CDP was 100% White (U.S. Census)

There were 16 households, out of which 37.5% had children under the age of 18 living with them, 56.3% were married couples living together, 6.3% had a female householder with no husband present, and 37.5% were non-families. 18.8% of all households were made up of individuals, and none had someone living alone who was 65 years of age or older. The average household size was 2.25 and the average family size was 2.60.

In the CDP, the population was spread out, with 19.4% under the age of 18, 27.8% from 25 to 44, 44.4% from 45 to 64, and 8.3% who were 65 years of age or older. The median age was 46 years. For every 100 females, there were 89.5 males. For every 100 females age 18 and over, there were 93.3 males.

The median income for a household in the CDP was $30,250, and the median income for a family was $31,750. Males had a median income of $0 versus $16,250 for females. The per capita income for the CDP was $11,396. There were no families and 25.0% of the population living below the poverty line, including no under eighteens and none of those over 64.
