= Weeki Wachee Springs =

Natural tourist attraction located in Florida

Weeki Wachee Springs State Park
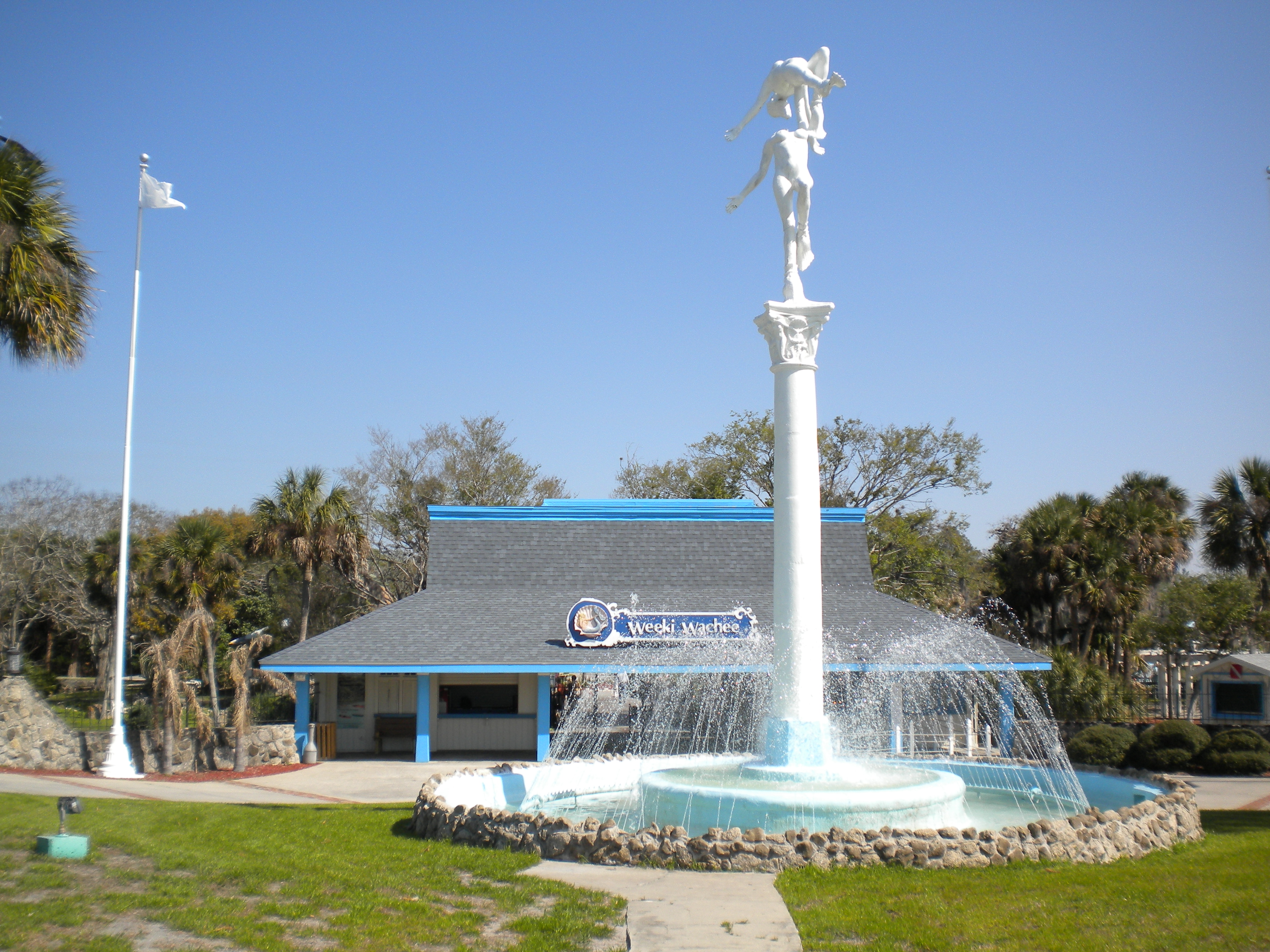
- Entrance to Weeki Wachee Springs State Park

- Location within Florida Location within the United States
- Interactive map of Weeki Wachee Springs State Park
- Location: 6131 Commercial Way, Weeki Wachee, Florida
- Nearest city: Weeki Wachee
- Coordinates: 28°31′03″N 82°34′21″W
- Area: 640 acres (260 ha) (original); 440 acres (180 ha) (after 1998 adjustment)
- Weeki Wachee Springs
- U.S. National Register of Historic Places
- NRHP reference No.: 09000843
- Added to NRHP: September 10, 2009

Weeki Wachee Springs (Officially: Weeki Wachee Springs State Park) is a natural tourist attraction located in Weeki Wachee, Florida, where underwater performances by "mermaids", women wearing fish tails as well as other fanciful outfits, can be viewed in an aquarium-like setting in the spring of the Weeki Wachee River. A waterpark, Buccaneer Bay, river boat rides, kayak and paddleboard rental are some of the other activities offered at Weeki Wachee Springs.

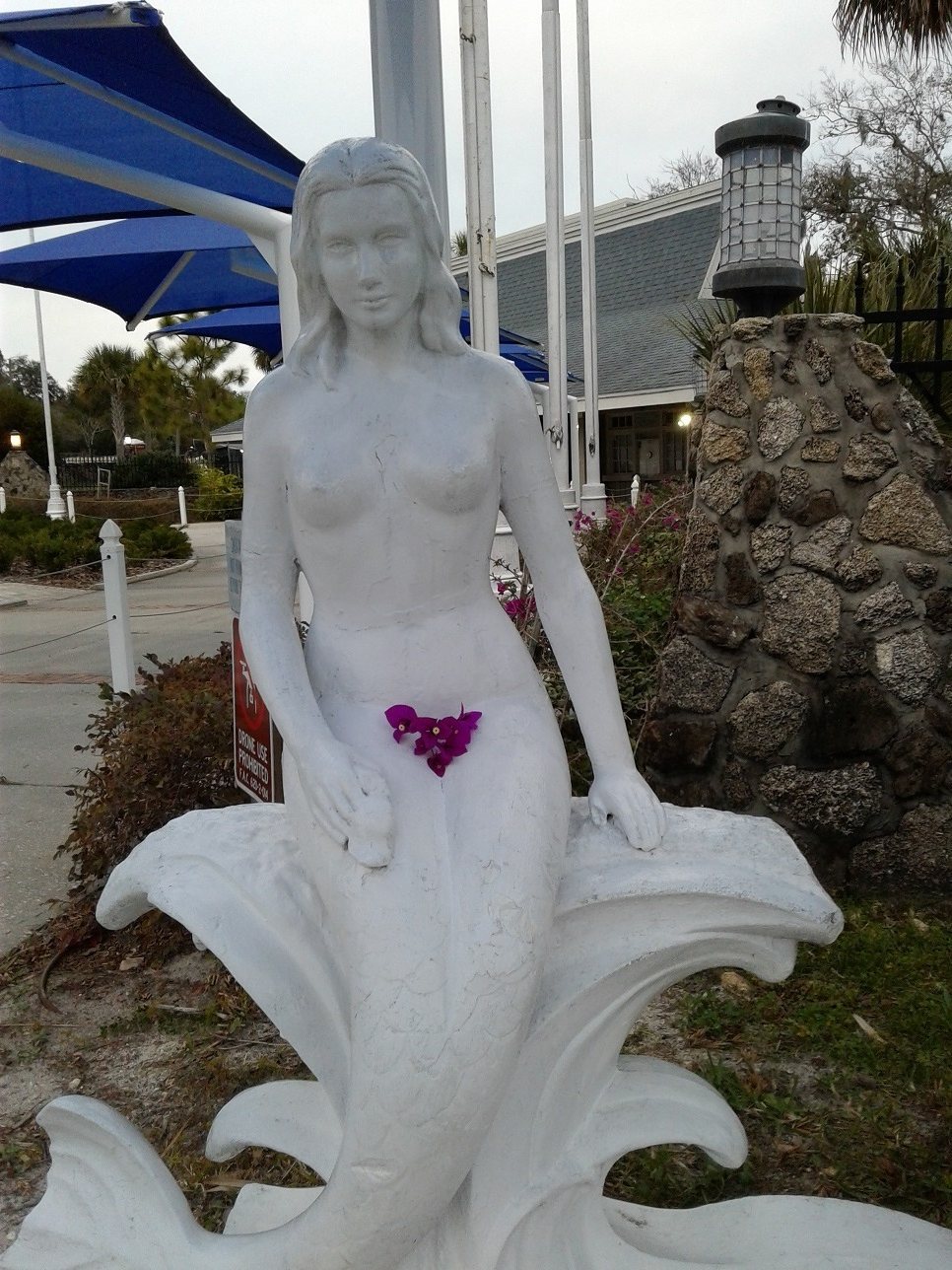
Mermaid statue at Weeki Wachee Springs, Florida

== History ==
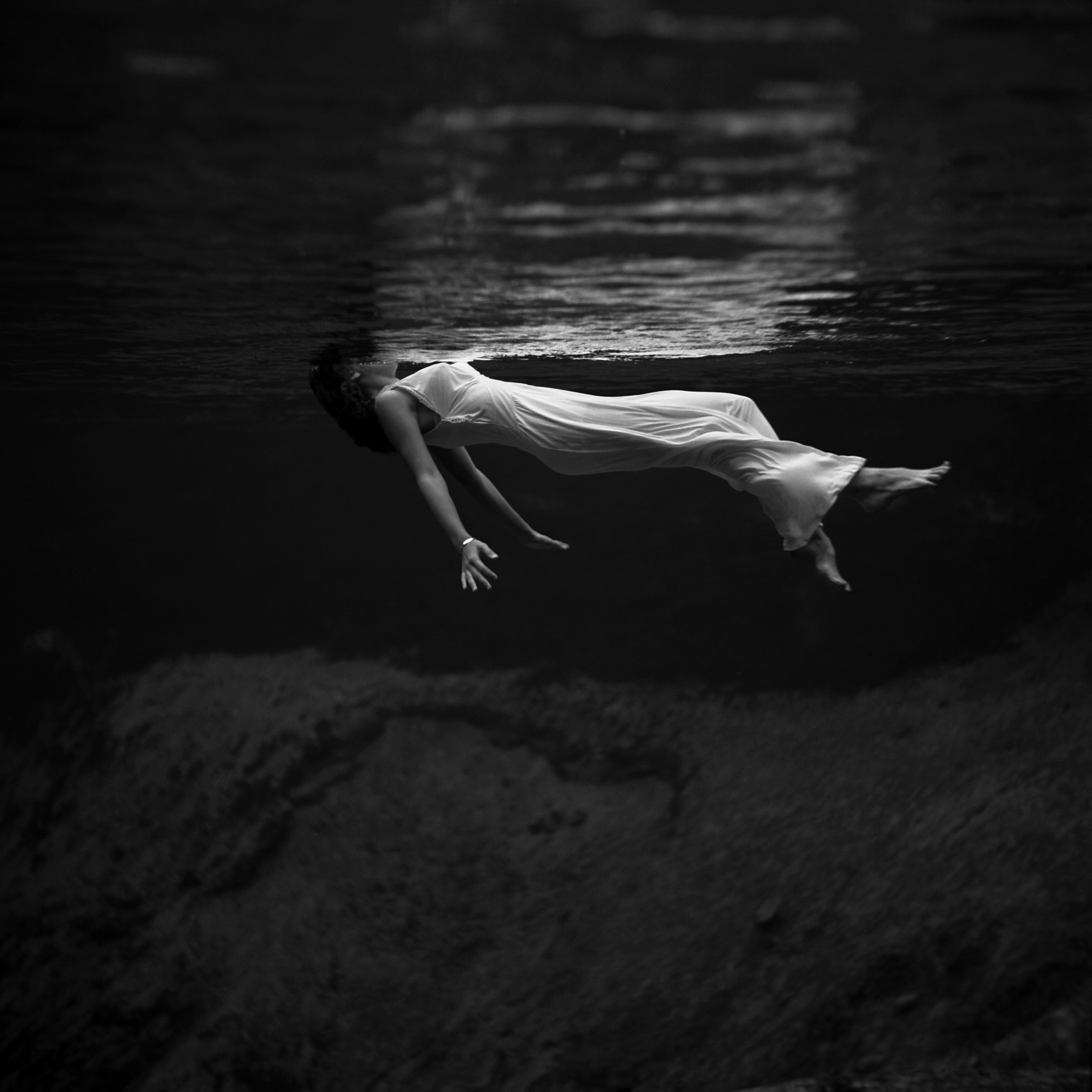
A fashion photograph taken at Weeki Wachee Springs by Toni Frissell, first published in Harper's Bazaar, December 1947.

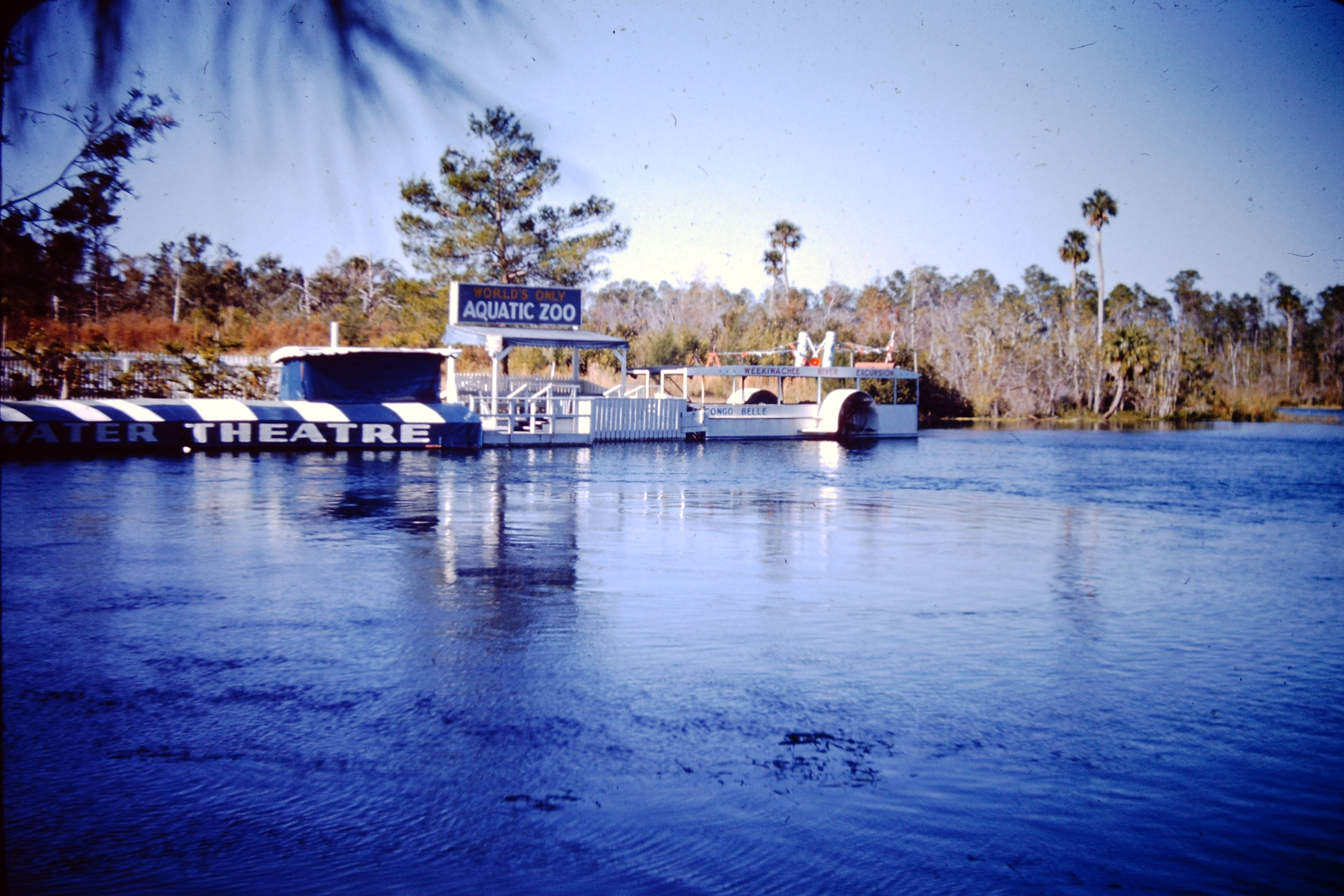
Slide photo of Weeki Wachee Springs sometime in the 1950s

The spring was named "Weeki Wachee" by Seminoles, which means "Little Spring" or "Winding River" in their language. The attraction was created in 1947 by stunt swimmer and attraction promoter Newt Perry, who based the show on underwater air hose breathing techniques. First an 18-seat theater, then later a newer theater with a capacity of 50, were embedded in the lime rock of the spring with viewing windows below the surface of the water, to allow visitors to watch the mermaids perform in the spring. The Incredible Mr. Limpet, an American live-action/animated comedy film produced by Warner Bros. had its premiere on January 20, 1964, at the Weeki Wachee Springs Underwater Theater. It was the world's first underwater movie premiere. In 1982, Buccaneer Bay was opened with water slides, a lazy river, and a white sand beach for visitors to enjoy alongside the theater with the mermaid shows.

Guests to the park have included Elvis Presley, Don Knotts, Esther Williams, Arthur Godfrey, Kevin Smith, and Larry the Cable Guy. Hollywood has occasionally used the attraction and its mermaids in the filming of movies such as Mr. Peabody and the Mermaid (1948), Neptune's Daughter (1949), and Sunshine State (2002), and many television shows like Route 66 (1963, #25, "The Cruelest Sea of All") and Bobcat Goldthwait's Misfits & Monsters (2018). At one point, the attraction was owned by broadcast network ABC, and this led to an increase in publicity for the attraction. Currently, the park is owned by the State of Florida and operated by the Florida Department of Environmental Protection, and is a member of the Florida State Park System. The park was listed on the National Register of Historic Places in 2020.

== Later events ==
In 2005, English rock band Supergrass filmed their video for their song "Low C" at the Springs. They filmed a short documentary about the spring, as well as playing at a local bar and swimming with the mermaids. An NBC television special featuring Penn & Teller and filmed at the Springs was released later that year.

In summer of 2006, stand-up comedian Thomas J. Kelly became the park's first ever male mermaid. His adventures were chronicled in a Web television series called "The Little Merman".

On November 1, 2008, the state of Florida took over Weeki Wachee Springs as a state park.

From May 22 until August 30, 2007, the discharge level at Weeki Wachee spring dropped to a level that allowed for cave divers to gain effective entry into the cave system at the spring. The Karst Underwater Research team successfully executed exploration dives and the necessary in-water decompression to explore approximately 6,700 feet in multiple passages at an average depth of 265 feet fresh water (ffw) with a maximum depth of 407 ffw. The 407 ffw depth makes the cave system under Weeki Wachee springs the deepest known freshwater cave system in the United States.

Scenes from Kelly Clarkson's video "Stronger (What Doesn't Kill You)" include the mermaids of Weeki Wachee Springs.

Key scenes from Amy Seimetz's directorial debut Sun Don't Shine take place at the Springs and include the mermaids.

The 2017 documentary Mermaids featured the attraction as well as a number of former and serving mermaids.

The 2023 Netflix documentary series MerPeople features the mermaids and history of Weeki Wachee Springs.

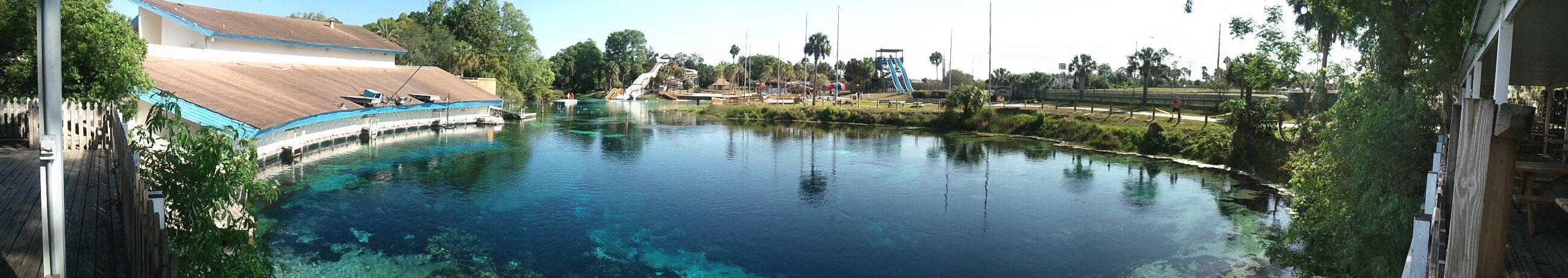

== See also ==
- Cave diving
- Glass-bottom boat
- National Register of Historic Places listings in Hernando County, Florida
