= Wildlife Lane =

Coordinates: 28.5356715°N 82.2625272°W

South Croom/Wildlife Lane
- Street and apparent neighborhood
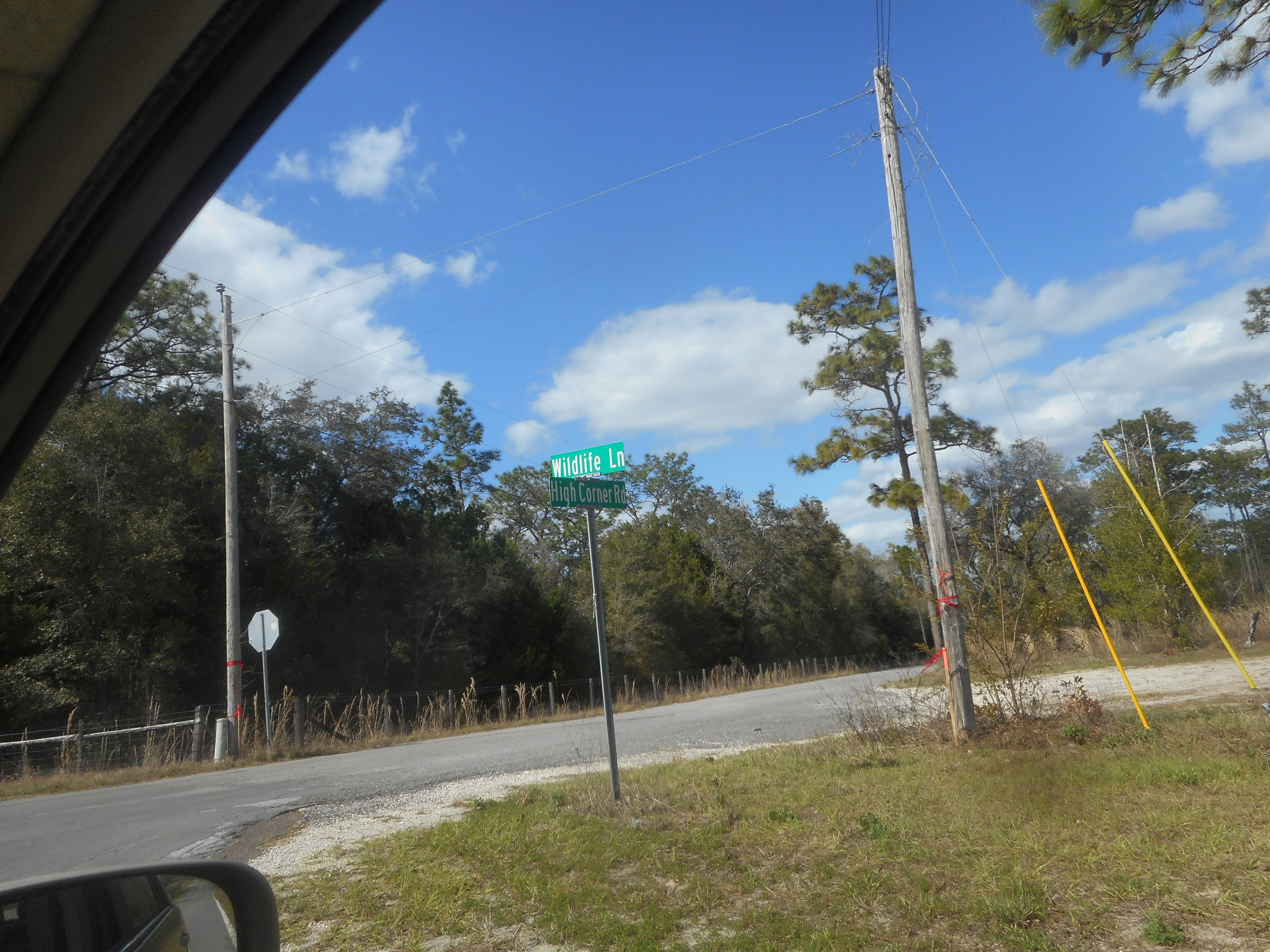
- Wildlife Lane and the intersection of High Corner Road in Hernando County, Florida

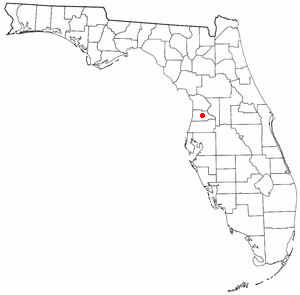
- Country: United States

Area
  - Total: 5.0 sq mi (12.9 km^{2})
  - Land: 4.9 sq mi (12.8 km^{2})
  - Water: 0.039 sq mi (0.1 km^{2}) 0.60%

Population
  - Total: 454

Wildlife Lane is a street and apparent neighborhood in Hernando County, Florida. It is located along the north side of US 98-SR 50 east of Hill 'n Dale, Florida and west of Interstate 75 in Florida. It is also located along the southern edge of the Croom Tract of the Withlacoochee State Forest.

== Demographics ==
As of the census of 2000, there were 254 people, 220 households, and 245 families residing in the area. The population density was 34.2/km^{2} . There were 259 housing units. The demographic makeup of the area was 98.2% White, 0.50% African American, 1.2% Native American, 0.1% Asian

There were 220 households, out of which 33.7% had children under the age of 18 living with them, 39.9% were married couples living together, 14.0% had a female householder with no husband present, and 43.1% were non-families. 38.0% of all households were made up of single individuals, and 21.2% had someone living alone who was 65 years of age or older. The average household size was 2.14 and the average family size was 2.82.

22.1% of the population was under the age of 18, 7.8% ranged from 18 to 24, 21.7% from 25 to 44, 18.7% from 45 to 64, and 29.7% who were 65 years of age or older. The median age was 44 years.

The median income for a household in the area was $33,489, and the median income for a family was $31,060. Males had a median income of $29,837 versus $21,804 for females. The per capita income for the area was $16,265. About 16.8% of families and 21.5% of the population were below the poverty line, including 27.9% of those under age 18 and 11.5% of those age 65 or over.
