= Garden Grove, Florida =

- Census-designated place
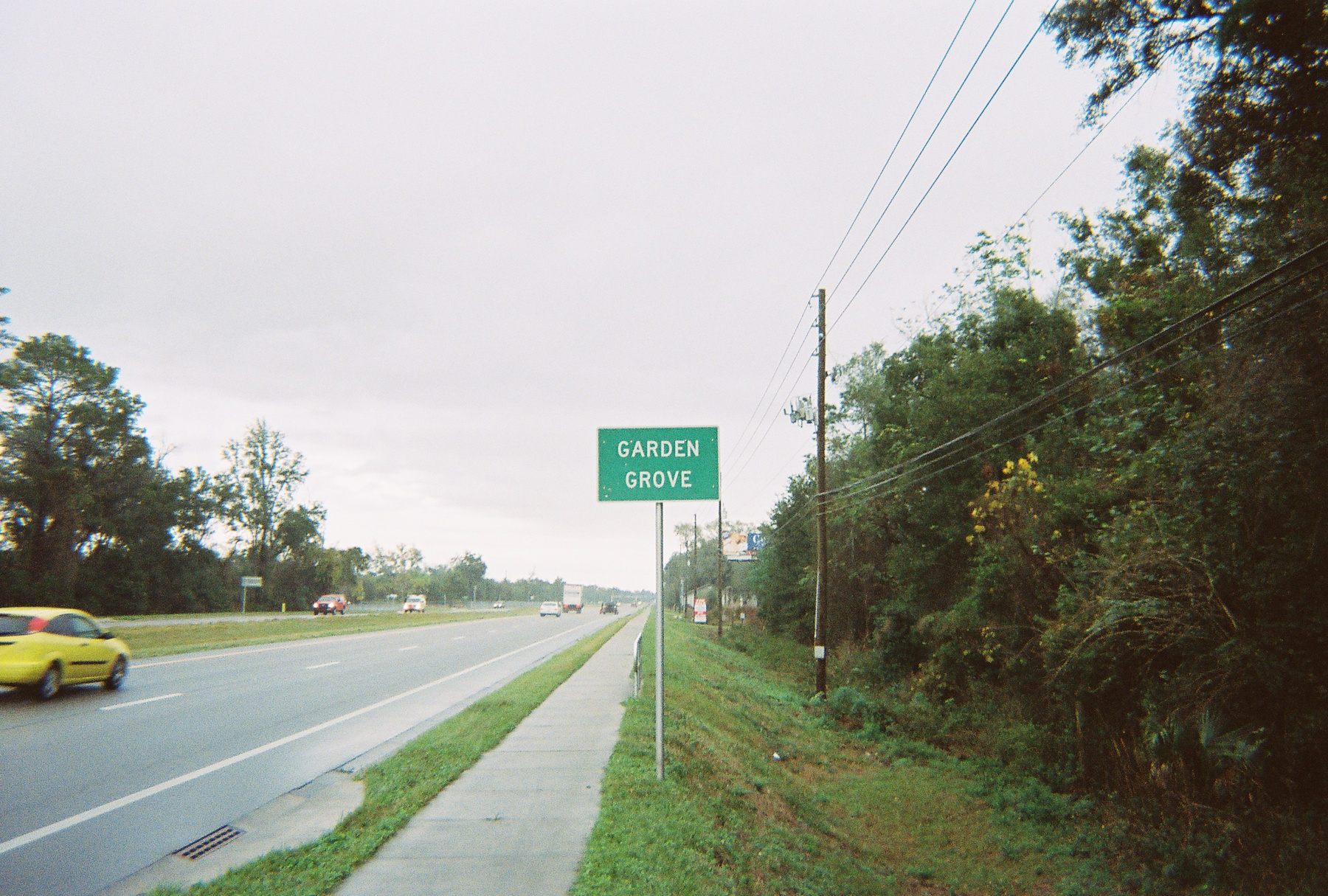
- US 41 northbound as it enters Garden Grove

- Location within Florida Location within the United States
- Coordinates: 28°28′18″N 82°26′06″W
- Country: United States
- State: Florida
- County: Hernando

Area
  - Total: 0.98 sq mi (2.53 km^{2})
  - Land: 0.97 sq mi (2.51 km^{2})
  - Water: 0.0077 sq mi (0.02 km^{2})
- Elevation: 79 ft (24 m)

Population (2020)
  - Total: 776
  - Density: 801.1/sq mi (309.29/km^{2})
- Time zone: UTC-5 (Eastern (EST))
  - Summer (DST): UTC-4 (EDT)
- FIPS code: 12-25475
- GNIS feature ID: 2583347

Garden Grove (also known as Garden Grove Estates) is an unincorporated community and census-designated place (CDP) in the U.S. state of Florida, in central Hernando County. The ZIP Code for this community is 34604. As of the 2020 census, Garden Grove had a population of 776.

== Geography ==
Garden Grove is in southern Hernando County and is bordered by Masaryktown to the south, South Brooksville to the north, and Spring Hill to the west. Garden Grove is located along the eastern edge of Hernando County Airport and is dominated by US 41, the main road through the community.

Though they list their address as being Brooksville, Garden Grove is the headquarters of the Southwest Florida Water Management District which is across from The Trails of Rivard Golf and Country Club.

== Demographics ==
Historical population
Census	Pop.	Note	%±
2020	776		—
U.S. Decennial Census

Garden Grove first appeared as a census designated place in the 2010 U.S. census.

== Transportation ==
The main road through Garden Grove is U.S. 41, which runs southwest to northeast from Masaryktown through Brooksville, the Hernando County seat. The CSX Brooksville Subdivision runs along the east side of the road, and contains a spur to the airport, which was revived when US 41 was widened. Two other roads run from west to east; the first is County Road 574 (Spring Hill Drive), which runs along the northern border of Hernando County Airport before terminating at US 41. The other, County Road 572 (Powell Road), runs along the northern edge of Garden Grove and spans from near Weeki Wachee to Spring Lake.
