= Lake Lindsey, Florida =

- Census-designated place
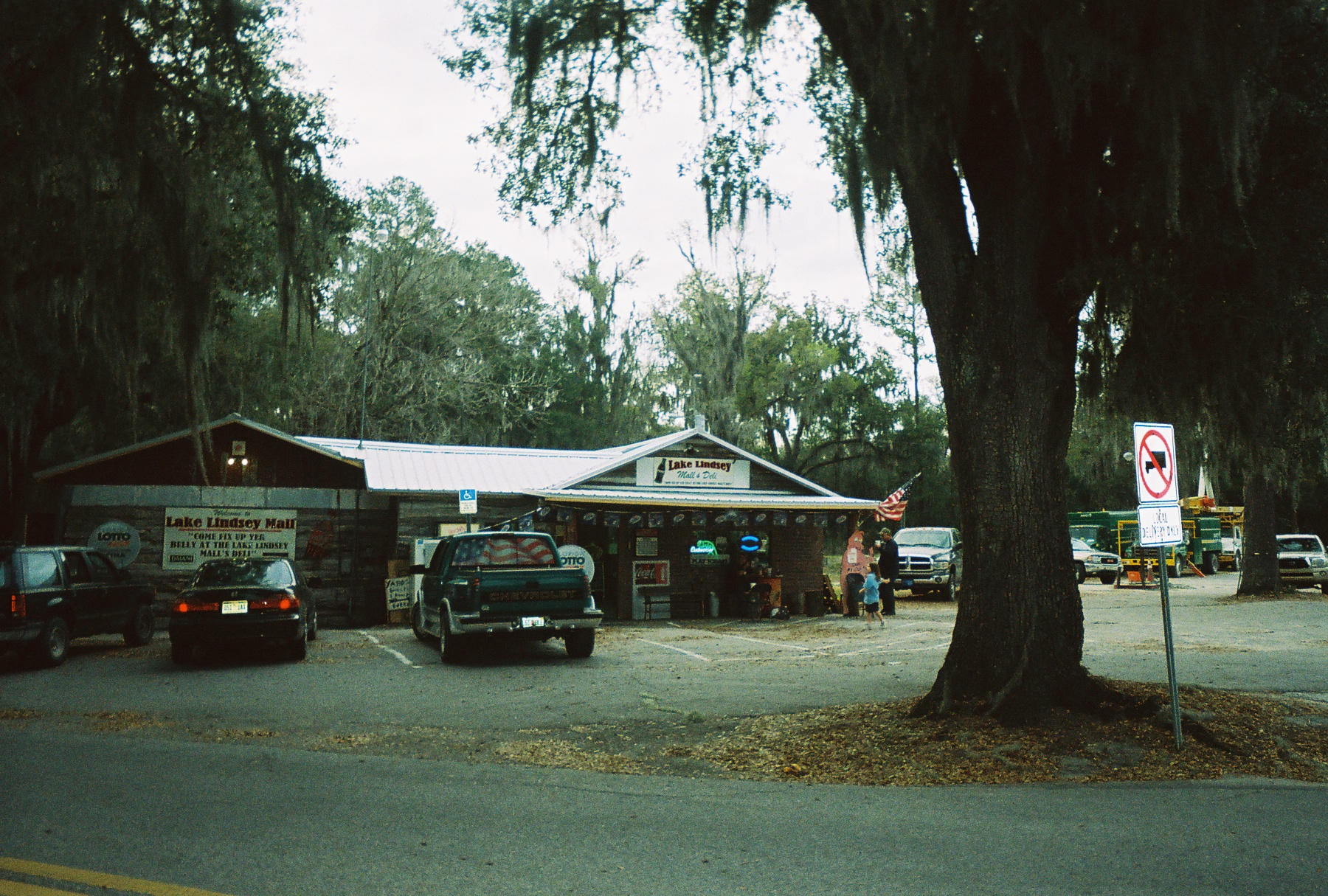
- Lake Lindsey's local general store

- Location in Hernando County and the state of Florida
- Coordinates: 28°37′56″N 82°21′42″W
- Country: United States
- State: Florida
- County: Hernando

Area
  - Total: 0.089 sq mi (0.23 km^{2})
  - Land: 0.089 sq mi (0.23 km^{2})
  - Water: 0 sq mi (0.00 km^{2})
- Elevation: 89 ft (27 m)

Population (2020)
  - Total: 90
  - Density: 995.5/sq mi (384.37/km^{2})
- Time zone: UTC-5 (Eastern (EST))
  - Summer (DST): UTC-4 (EDT)
- ZIP code: 34601
- Area code: 352
- FIPS code: 12-38275
- GNIS feature ID: 2403195

Lake Lindsey is an unincorporated community and census-designated place (CDP) in Hernando County, Florida, United States. As of the 2020 census, Lake Lindsey had a population of 90.

== Geography ==
Lake Lindsey is located in northeastern Hernando County on the northeastern side of the small lake of the same name. It is 6 miles (10 km) north of Brooksville, the county seat.

According to the United States Census Bureau, the CDP has a total area of 0.089 square miles (0.23 km^{2}), all land.

== Demographics ==
Historical population
Census	Pop.	Note	%±
2020	90		—
U.S. Decennial Census

As of the census of 2000, there were 49 people, 23 households, and 12 families residing in the CDP. The population density was 2,206.8 inhabitants per square mile (852.1/km^{2}). There were 30 housing units at an average density of 1,351.1 per square mile (521.7/km^{2}). The racial makeup of the CDP was 100.00% White.

There were 23 households, out of which 30.4% had children under the age of 18 living with them, 34.8% were married couples living together, 17.4% had a female householder with no husband present, and 43.5% were non-families. 34.8% of all households were made up of individuals, and 13.0% had someone living alone who was 65 years of age or older. The average household size was 2.13 and the average family size was 2.62.

In the CDP, the population was spread out, with 26.5% under the age of 18, 2.0% from 18 to 24, 32.7% from 25 to 44, 26.5% from 45 to 64, and 12.2% who were 65 years of age or older. The median age was 40 years. For every 100 females, there were 88.5 males. For every 100 females age 18 and over, there were 71.4 males.

The median income for a household in the CDP was $25,192, and the median income for a family was $18,750. Males had a median income of $0 versus $8,750 for females. The per capita income for the CDP was $10,314. There were no families and 15.9% of the population living below the poverty line, including no under eighteens and none of those over 64.
