= Weeki Wachee, Florida =

Unincorporated community in Florida, United States

- Unincorporated community
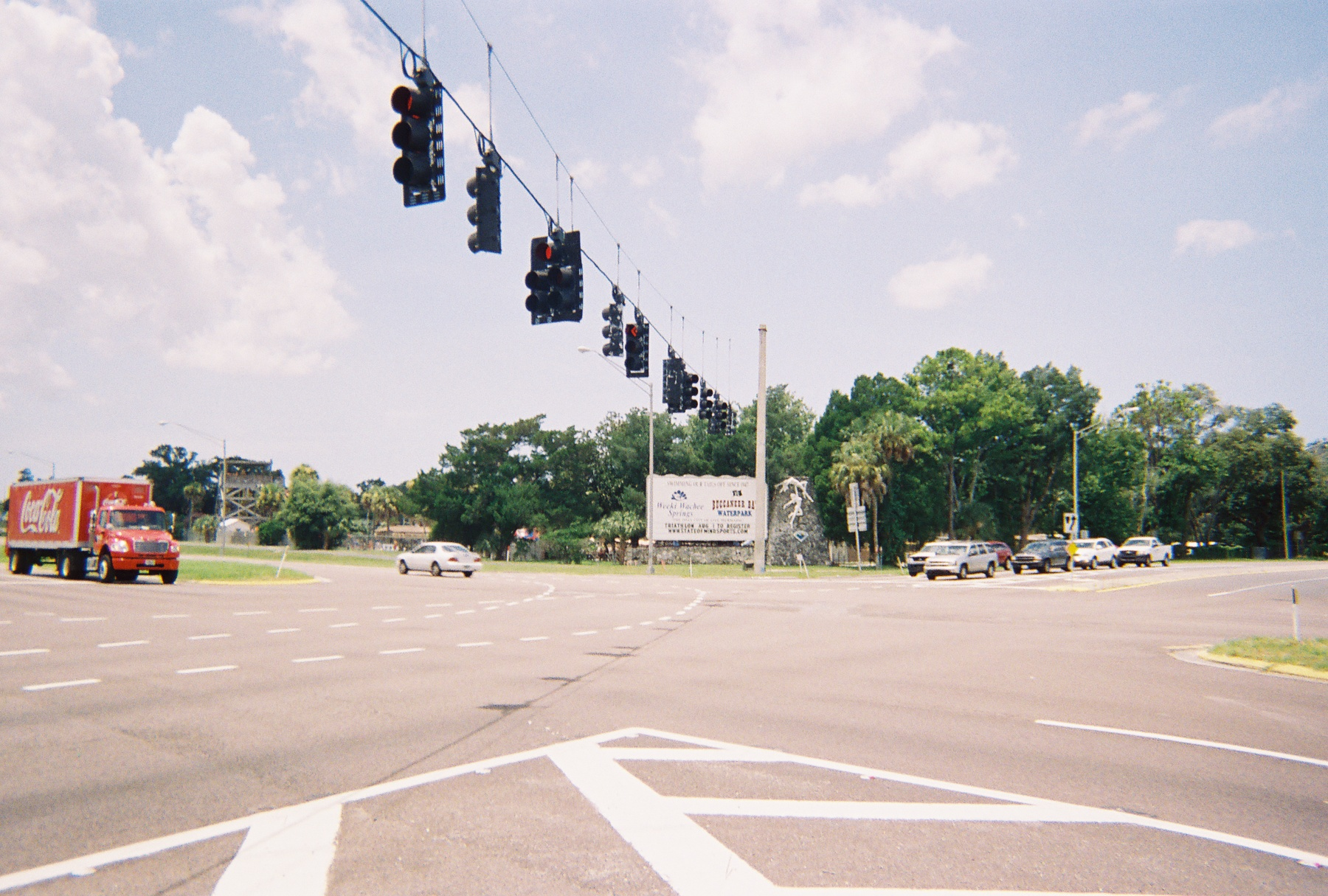
- US 19, SR 50 and CR 550 intersect at Weeki Wachee Springs and Buccaneer Bay

- Location in Hernando County and the state of Florida
- Coordinates: 28°31′01″N 82°34′39″W
- Country: United States
- State: Florida
- County: Hernando
- Founded: 1966
- Dissolved: June 2020

Area
  - Total: 1.05 sq mi (2.73 km^{2})
  - Land: 1.00 sq mi (2.60 km^{2})
  - Water: 0.050 sq mi (0.13 km^{2})
- Elevation: 10 ft (3.0 m)

Population (2020)
  - Total: 16
  - Density: 13/sq mi (5/km^{2})
- Time zone: UTC−05:00 (EST)
  - Summer (DST): UTC−04:00 (EDT)
- Area code: 352
- FIPS code: 12-75625
- GNIS feature ID: 2405701
- Website: www.weekiwachee.com

Weeki Wachee is an unincorporated community and former city located in Hernando County, Florida, United States. As of the 2020 census, the community has a total population of 16. The 12,000-acre (4,900 ha) Weeki Wachee Preserve and the Weeki Wachee Springs park are located in the area. The park includes water rides, animal shows, mermaid costume shows, and manatee watching. The communities of Weeki Wachee Gardens and Spring Hill are nearby.

== History ==
Weeki Wachee was founded as a city in 1966 to promote the local mermaid attraction. With fewer than 15 residents, and increased concerns over the city's finances, services, and state park operations, state representative Blaise Ingoglia sponsored a bill to dissolve the city, and Governor Ron DeSantis signed it into law in June 2020. Hernando County, the county the former city resides in, was responsible for resolving its financial issues. Park operations were not affected.

== Geography ==
The former city boundaries of Weeki Wachee was located in western Hernando County. Via U.S. Route 19, it was 19 miles (31 km) north of Port Richey and 20 miles (32 km) south of Homosassa Springs. Via Florida State Road 50, Weeki Wachee was 12 miles (19 km) west of Brooksville, the Hernando County seat.

According to the United States Census Bureau, the city had a total area of 1.1 square miles (2.8 km^{2}), of which 0.050 square miles (0.13 km^{2}), or 4.68%, was water.

== Demographics ==
Historical population
Census	Pop.	Note	%±
1970	76		—
1980	8		−89.5%
1990	53		562.5%
2000	12		−77.4%
2010	12		0.0%
2020	16		33.3%
U.S. Decennial Census

As of the 2000 U.S. census, there were 12 people, five households, and five families residing in the city. The population density was 11.8 people per square mile (4.5/km^{2}). There were five housing units at an average density of 4.9 per square mile (1.9/km^{2}). As identified by the census, no one in Weeki Wachee was Hispanic or Latino. All residents were White except for one Native American member of the Little River Band of Ottawa Indians.

== Weeki Wachee Springs ==
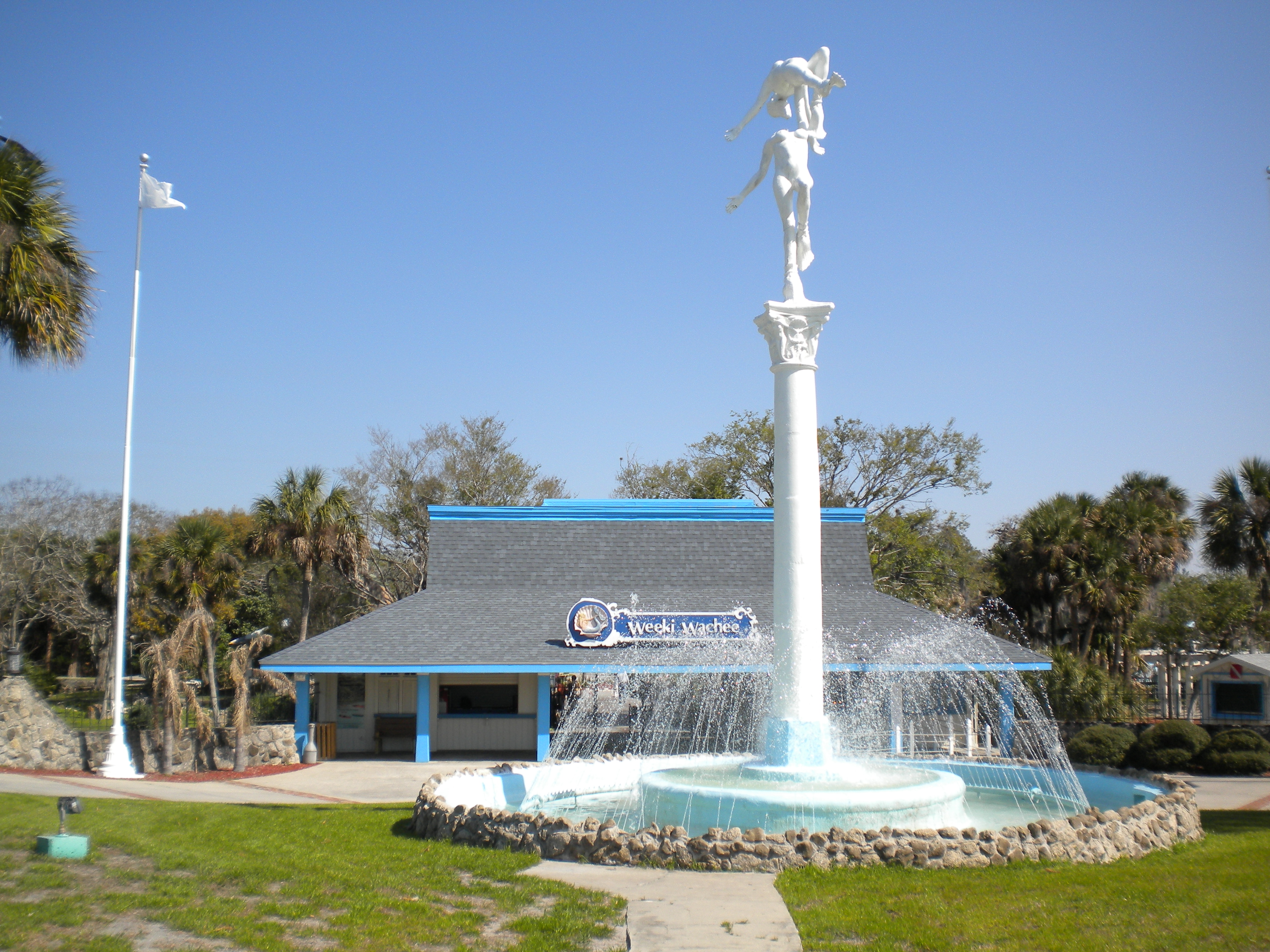
Entrance to Weeki Wachee Springs State Park

=== Tourist attraction ===
Weeki Wachee Springs, the spring of the Weeki Wachee River, is a Florida tourist attraction where underwater performances by mermaids — women dressed in fancy outfits with fins about their legs — can be viewed in an aquarium-like setting. The attraction includes a Buccaneer Bay water park, animal shows, and boat rides. General Manager Robyn Anderson was the town's mayor. The park is now a Florida State Park and is owned and managed by the State Parks department.

=== Deepest naturally formed spring in the United States ===
From May 22 until August 30, 2007, the discharge level at Weeki Wachee spring dropped to a level that allowed for cave divers to gain effective entry into the cave system at the spring. The Karst Underwater Research team successfully executed exploration dives and the necessary in-water decompression to explore approximately 6,700 feet (2,000 m) in multiple passages at an average depth of 265 feet (81 m) fresh water (ffw) with a maximum depth of 407 feet (124 m) ffw.
