= Masaryktown, Florida =

- Census-designated place
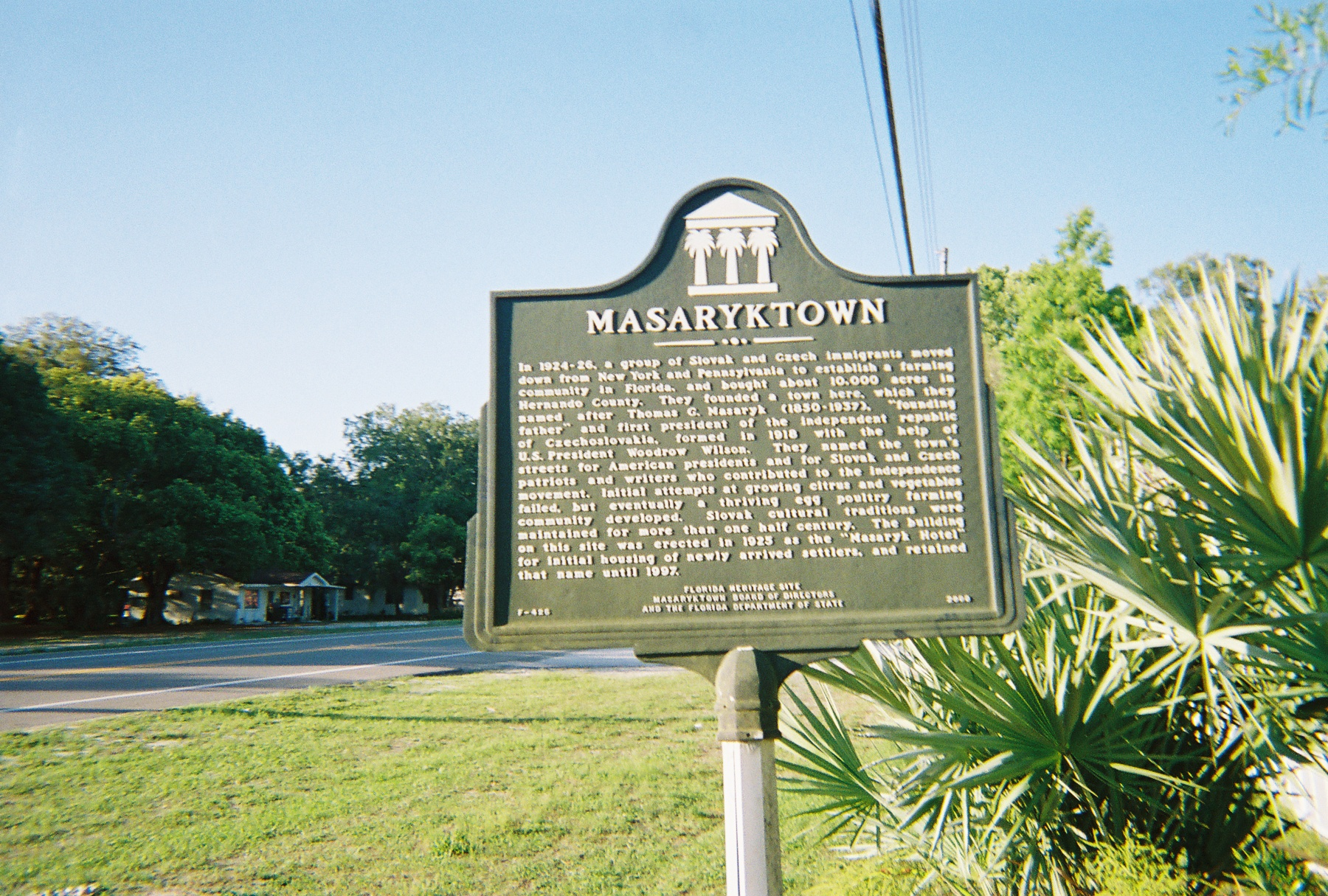
- Historic plaque on the corner of US 41 & Wilson Boulevard in Masaryktown

- Location in Hernando County and the state of Florida
- Coordinates: 28°26′30″N 82°27′39″W
- Country: United States
- State: Florida
- County: Hernando

Area
  - Total: 1.05 sq mi (2.72 km^{2})
  - Land: 1.05 sq mi (2.71 km^{2})
  - Water: 0.0039 sq mi (0.01 km^{2})
- Elevation: 66 ft (20 m)

Population (2020)
  - Total: 1,077
  - Density: 1,029.9/sq mi (397.63/km^{2})
- Time zone: UTC-5 (Eastern (EST))
  - Summer (DST): UTC-4 (EDT)
- ZIP code: 34604
- Area code: 352
- FIPS code: 12-43400
- GNIS feature ID: 2403258

Masaryktown is an unincorporated community and census-designated place (CDP) in Hernando County, Florida, United States. The population was 1,077 at the 2020 census. It is named after the first president of Czechoslovakia, Tomáš Garrigue Masaryk.

== Geography ==
Masaryktown is located along the southern edge of Hernando County. It is bordered to the north and west by Spring Hill, to the northeast by Garden Grove, and to the south in Pasco County by Shady Hills. U.S. Route 41 runs through the eastern side of the community, leading north 9 miles (14 km) to Brooksville, the Hernando County seat, and south 17 miles (27 km) to Land o' Lakes. Tampa is 36 miles (58 km) to the south.

According to the United States Census Bureau, Masaryktown has a total area of 1.0 square mile (2.7 km^{2}), of which 0.004 square miles (0.01 km^{2}), or 0.53%, are water.

== History ==
Masaryktown was founded in 1924 and named after Tomáš Garrigue Masaryk, the founder and first president of Czechoslovakia. Of the original 61 persons who met to found the town, 60 were Slovak and only one was Czech. They formed the Hernando Plantation Company and sold at a price of $1,000.00 per share, which granted the right for each share-owner to purchase 20 acres of land. The settlers first planted oranges, but killer frosts devastated the orchards. Many Slovaks eventually left, and by 1952, only 15-25 families remained to carry on a more prosperous enterprise in chicken farming. But even they declined by 1965 due to intense competition.

Few Slovaks remain there today, but the legacy of their settlement remains, as the original founders named the streets running east to west after Slovak national and literary leaders such as Štúr, Hurban, Kollár, Štefánik, Hodža, Hviezdoslav, and Mudron. One street is named after the famous Czech historian, Palacký, and the central boulevard is named after Masaryk. North-south streets are named in honor of American presidents such as Wilson, who assisted in enabling Czecho-Slovak independence, as well as Jefferson, Madison, and Lincoln.

== Demographics ==
Historical population
Census	Pop.	Note	%±
2020	1,077		—
U.S. Decennial Census

=== 2020 census ===
As of the 2020 census, Masaryktown had a population of 1,077. The median age was 42.6 years. 21.6% of residents were under the age of 18 and 16.2% of residents were 65 years of age or older. For every 100 females there were 89.3 males, and for every 100 females age 18 and over there were 85.9 males age 18 and over.

91.9% of residents lived in urban areas, while 8.1% lived in rural areas.

There were 437 households in Masaryktown, of which 33.2% had children under the age of 18 living in them. Of all households, 46.5% were married-couple households, 19.7% were households with a male householder and no spouse or partner present, and 25.2% were households with a female householder and no spouse or partner present. About 22.6% of all households were made up of individuals and 13.1% had someone living alone who was 65 years of age or older.

There were 492 housing units, of which 11.2% were vacant. The homeowner vacancy rate was 2.3% and the rental vacancy rate was 11.0%.

Racial composition as of the 2020 census
Race	Number	Percent
White	890	82.6%
Black or African American	13	1.2%
American Indian and Alaska Native	11	1.0%
Asian	15	1.4%
Native Hawaiian and Other Pacific Islander	0	0.0%
Some other race	63	5.8%
Two or more races	85	7.9%
Hispanic or Latino (of any race)	176	16.3%

=== 2000 census ===
As of the 2000 census, there were 920 people, 379 households, and 264 families residing in the CDP. The population density was 868.7 inhabitants per square mile (335.4/km^{2}). There were 431 housing units at an average density of 407.0 per square mile (157.1/km^{2}). The racial makeup of the CDP was 95.43% White, 0.33% African American, 0.22% Native American, 0.43% Asian, 2.17% from other races, and 1.41% from two or more races. Hispanic or Latino of any race were 6.63% of the population.

There were 379 households, out of which 29.0% had children under the age of 18 living with them, 52.5% were married couples living together, 12.1% had a female householder with no husband present, and 30.3% were non-families. 24.3% of all households were made up of individuals, and 13.2% had someone living alone who was 65 years of age or older. The average household size was 2.42 and the average family size was 2.86.

In the CDP, the population was spread out, with 23.0% under the age of 18, 7.3% from 18 to 24, 26.3% from 25 to 44, 23.4% from 45 to 64, and 20.0% who were 65 years of age or older. The median age was 42 years. For every 100 females, there were 91.3 males. For every 100 females age 18 and over, there were 92.9 males.

The median income for a household in the CDP was $35,524, and the median income for a family was $37,585. Males had a median income of $30,446 versus $24,000 for females. The per capita income for the CDP was $17,686. About 13.3% of families and 13.8% of the population were below the poverty line, including 26.0% of those under age 18 and 6.4% of those age 65 or over.
