= Weeki Wachee Preserve =

Coordinates: 28.5011°N 82.624°W

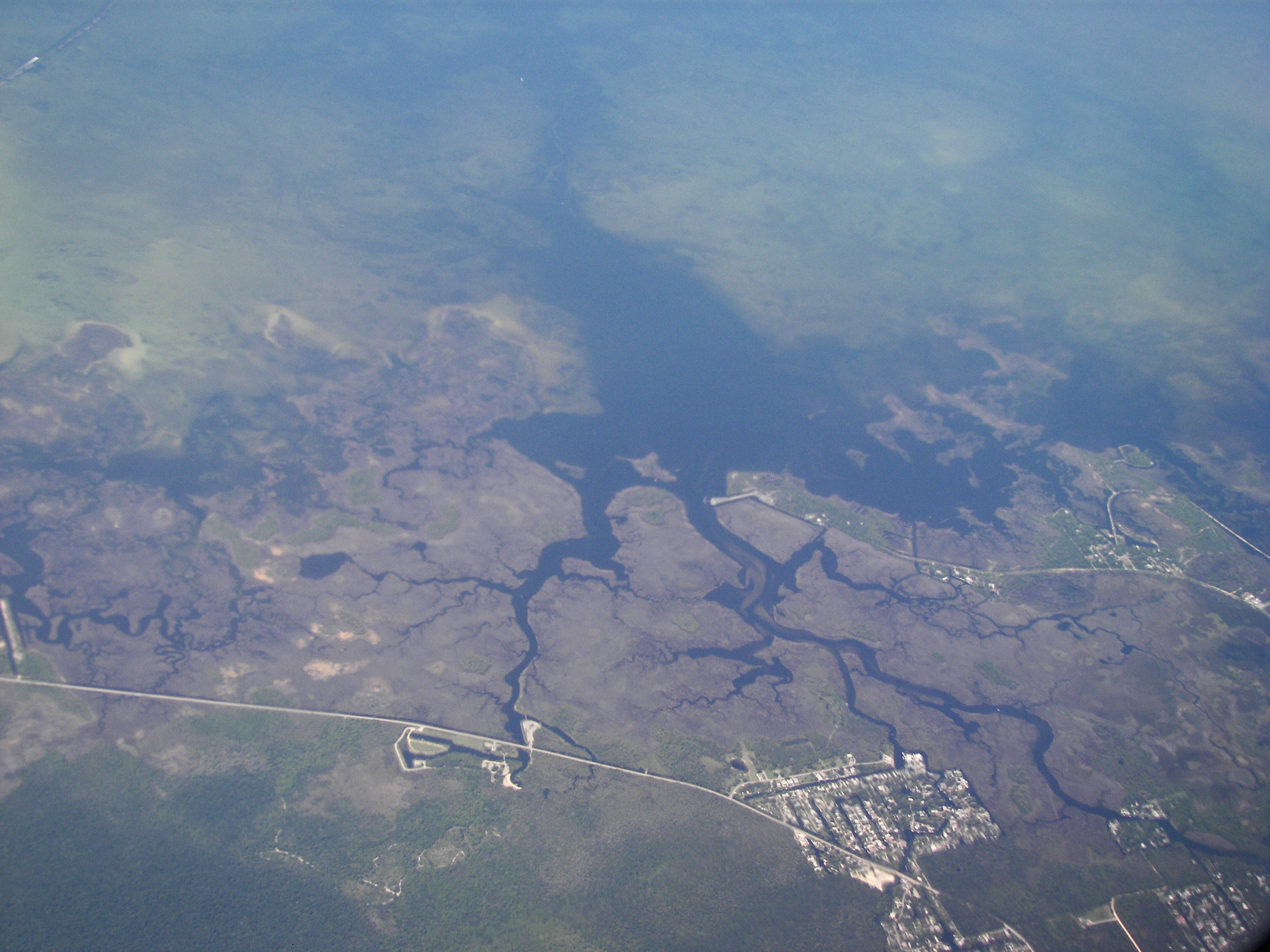
Aerial view of the border between the Weeki Wachee Preserve (lower left) and the rest of Hernando County.

Weeki Wachee Preserve (also given as Weekiwachee Preserve) is an 11,206 acre preserve in Hernando County, Florida. The preserve is located at 2345 Osowaw Boulevard in Spring Hill, Florida. The preserve offers recreational opportunities including hiking and bike trails, fishing, birding, hunting and boating for hand-launched non-gasoline engine crafts.

The site is known for its population of black bears. It is Site 69 on the west section of the Great Florida Birding Trail.

== History ==
The preserve was previously used as a limestone mine until 1995 when it was acquired by the Southwest Florida Water Management District. Hernando County provided funds to help SFWMD to obtain the land through their Environmentally Sensitive Lands Program. Between 1995 and 1996 a total of 7,136-acres were purchased for 15.1 million dollars. The additional 4,070-acres were obtained between 1997 and 2001. The limestone mines have since filled with water and are now manmade lakes. In 1997, the SFWMD proposed their "Plan for the Use and Management of the Weekiwachee Preserve." Originally, there was no fishing or boat launching of any kind within the preserve when it was first opened to public. Dogs were also not allowed in the preserve until 2020. Swimming was going to be permitted "only within a proposed beach and picnic complex." In the original plans but this complex was never realized. Swimming is now strictly prohibited within the preserve. In addition to the preserve's proposed recreational uses, SFWMD wanted to use the area for environmental research.

== See also ==
- Aripeka Sandhills Preserve
