= Hill 'n Dale, Florida =

- Census-designated place
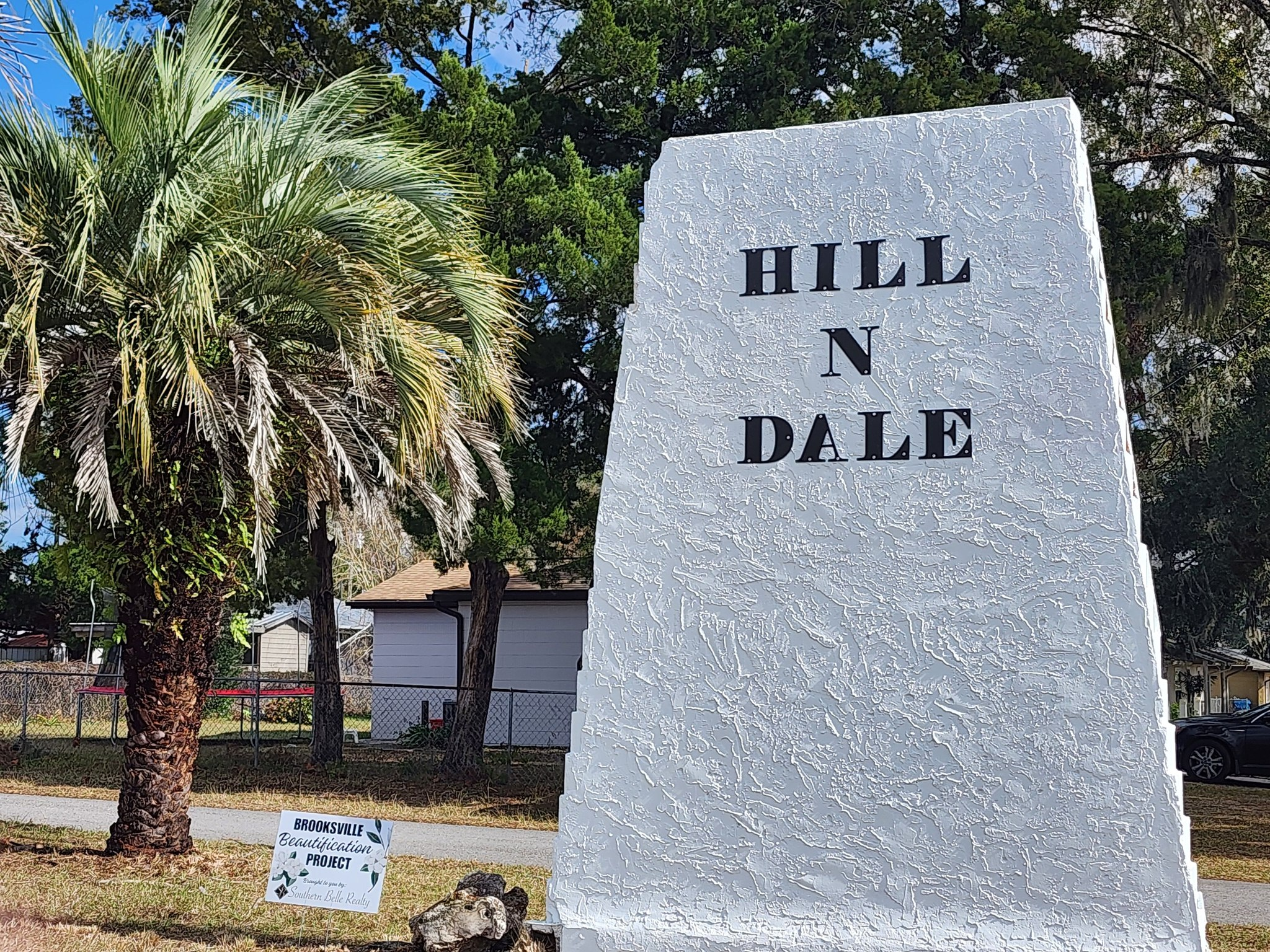
- Monument sign located at the entrance to the community

- Location in Hernando County and the state of Florida
- Coordinates: 28°31′09″N 82°17′30″W
- Country: United States
- State: Florida
- County: Hernando

Area
  - Total: 2.20 sq mi (5.70 km^{2})
  - Land: 2.20 sq mi (5.69 km^{2})
  - Water: 0 sq mi (0.00 km^{2})
- Elevation: 108 ft (33 m)

Population (2020)
  - Total: 2,212
  - Density: 1,006.1/sq mi (388.47/km^{2})
- Time zone: UTC-5 (Eastern (EST))
  - Summer (DST): UTC-4 (EDT)
- FIPS code: 12-30800
- GNIS feature ID: 2402588

Hill 'n Dale is a census-designated place (CDP) in Hernando County, Florida, United States. As of the 2020 census, Hill 'n Dale had a population of 2,212.

== Geography ==
Hill 'n Dale is located in eastern Hernando County. The older part of the community is north of the highway, but the CDP was expanded for the 2010 census to include a more lightly settled area south of the highway. US 98 leads west 6 miles (10 km) to Brooksville, the county seat, and east 3.5 miles (5.6 km) to Interstate 75 and 7 miles (11 km) to Ridge Manor. Hill 'n Dale is 44 miles (71 km) north of Tampa and 56 miles (90 km) south of Ocala.

According to the United States Census Bureau, the CDP has a total area of 2.2 square miles (5.7 km^{2}), all land.

== Demographics ==
Historical population
Census	Pop.	Note	%±
2020	2,212		—
U.S. Decennial Census

=== 2020 census ===
As of the 2020 census, Hill 'n Dale had a population of 2,212. The median age was 37.5 years. 27.7% of residents were under the age of 18 and 15.4% of residents were 65 years of age or older. For every 100 females there were 96.1 males, and for every 100 females age 18 and over there were 94.3 males age 18 and over.

0.0% of residents lived in urban areas, while 100.0% lived in rural areas.

There were 781 households in Hill 'n Dale, of which 31.8% had children under the age of 18 living in them. Of all households, 42.3% were married-couple households, 18.8% were households with a male householder and no spouse or partner present, and 29.3% were households with a female householder and no spouse or partner present. About 24.9% of all households were made up of individuals and 13.2% had someone living alone who was 65 years of age or older.

There were 842 housing units, of which 7.2% were vacant. The homeowner vacancy rate was 0.3% and the rental vacancy rate was 7.7%.

Racial composition as of the 2020 census
Race	Number	Percent
White	1,348	60.9%
Black or African American	506	22.9%
American Indian and Alaska Native	9	0.4%
Asian	22	1.0%
Native Hawaiian and Other Pacific Islander	7	0.3%
Some other race	109	4.9%
Two or more races	211	9.5%
Hispanic or Latino (of any race)	318	14.4%

=== 2000 census ===
As of the census of 2000, there were 1,436 people, 463 households, and 368 families residing in the CDP. The population density was 2,823.3 inhabitants per square mile (1,090.1/km^{2}). There were 511 housing units at an average density of 1,004.7 per square mile (387.9/km^{2}). The racial makeup of the CDP was 70.54% White, 24.79% African American, 0.14% Native American, 0.56% Asian, 2.16% from other races, and 1.81% from two or more races. Hispanic or Latino of any race were 7.59% of the population.

There were 463 households, out of which 47.3% had children under the age of 18 living with them, 49.5% were married couples living together, 23.1% had a female householder with no husband present, and 20.5% were non-families. 15.8% of all households were made up of individuals, and 6.7% had someone living alone who was 65 years of age or older. The average household size was 3.10 and the average family size was 3.43.

In the CDP, the population was spread out, with 36.4% under the age of 18, 9.9% from 18 to 24, 26.8% from 25 to 44, 17.4% from 45 to 64, and 9.5% who were 65 years of age or older. The median age was 28 years. For every 100 females, there were 86.7 males. For every 100 females age 18 and over, there were 72.9 males.

The median income for a household in the CDP was $31,974, and the median income for a family was $30,214. Males had a median income of $26,349 versus $22,065 for females. The per capita income for the CDP was $10,029. About 20.6% of families and 18.5% of the population were below the poverty line, including 23.1% of those under age 18 and 5.4% of those age 65 or over.

== See also ==
- Wildlife Lane
