= Karst Underwater Research =

American non-profit organization

- "Reconnaissance, Exploration, Survey, Sampling"
- Type: Registered non-profit 501(c)(3) organization
- Founded: 1996
- Headquarters: Dade City, Florida, United States
- Key people: Brett Hemphill, Director & President; Andrew Pitkin, Director; Michael Poucher, Director; Charlie Roberson, Director
- Website: www.karstunderwater.org

Karst Underwater Research (KUR) is a registered 501(c)(3) non-profit organization that specializes in the research and documentation of karst aquifers and their corresponding surface features. KUR members perform a variety of scientific processes, including mapping and cartography, radio location, photography, videography, YSI water analysis and sampling.

== List of research projects ==
- Weeki Wachee Springs & Little Spring/Twin Dees (Hernando County, FL)
- Phantom Spring (Jeff Davis County, TX)
- Eagle Nest Sink (Hernando County, FL)
- Cathedral Canyon (Suwannee County, FL)
- Falmouth Springs (Suwannee County, FL)
- Lineater Spring (Suwannee County, FL)
- Suwannee Springs (Suwannee County, FL)
- Manatee Springs (Levy County, FL)
- Compromise Sink (Suwannee County, FL)
- Florida Coastal Springs Research - Crystal Beach Spring, Double Keyhole, Buzz Spring, Free Ride, Turtle Grave

=== Weeki Wachee - Twin Dees Exploration Project ===
In 2007, KUR found that Weeki Wachee Springs is the deepest known naturally formed spring in the United States at a depth of 407 feet (124 m).

From May 22 until August 30, 2007, the discharge at Weeki Wachee Spring dropped to a level that allowed for cave divers to gain effective entry into the cave system at the head spring. The KUR team explored approximately 6,700 feet (2,000 m) in multiple passages at an average depth of 265 ffw (feet fresh-water) with a maximum depth of 407 ffw.

In 2013, KUR divers connected Weeki Wachee Spring to a smaller spring on the same property, Twin Dees (Little) Spring, which allowed further exploration of the whole system from there, as flow at the main Weeki Wachee Spring entrance has been too high for divers to enter there since 2012.

=== Phantom Spring Project ===
In January 2013, KUR divers found that Phantom Spring is the deepest underwater cave yet measured in the United States at a depth of 462 feet (141 m).

Working with Dr. Tom Iliffe of the Texas A&M University Marine Biology Department, the Phantom Spring project was started in 2012 with the goals of researching the invertebrate species and their habitat within the cave, and exploring the geography of the cave system to understand the environmental impact of the surrounding area. In 2012 biological finding were made and exploration of the system continued. In 2013, a section which led to the deepest known underwater cave in the country were discovered .

=== Cathedral Canyon World Record Dive ===
On Friday, November 4, 2016, KUR divers Jonathan Bernot and Charlie Roberson established a new world record of 26,930 feet (8,210 m) penetration from air in an underwater cave at Cathedral Canyon. Cathedral is the most upstream karst window in the Falmouth-Cathedral cave system, which is located in Suwannee County, Florida. This dive surpasses the previous record of 25,776 feet (7,857 m) set in 2008 by Jarrod Jablonski and Casey McKinlay at Wakulla Springs.
