= Weeki Wachee River =

River in Florida

Coordinates: 28.5313103°N 82.6216736°W

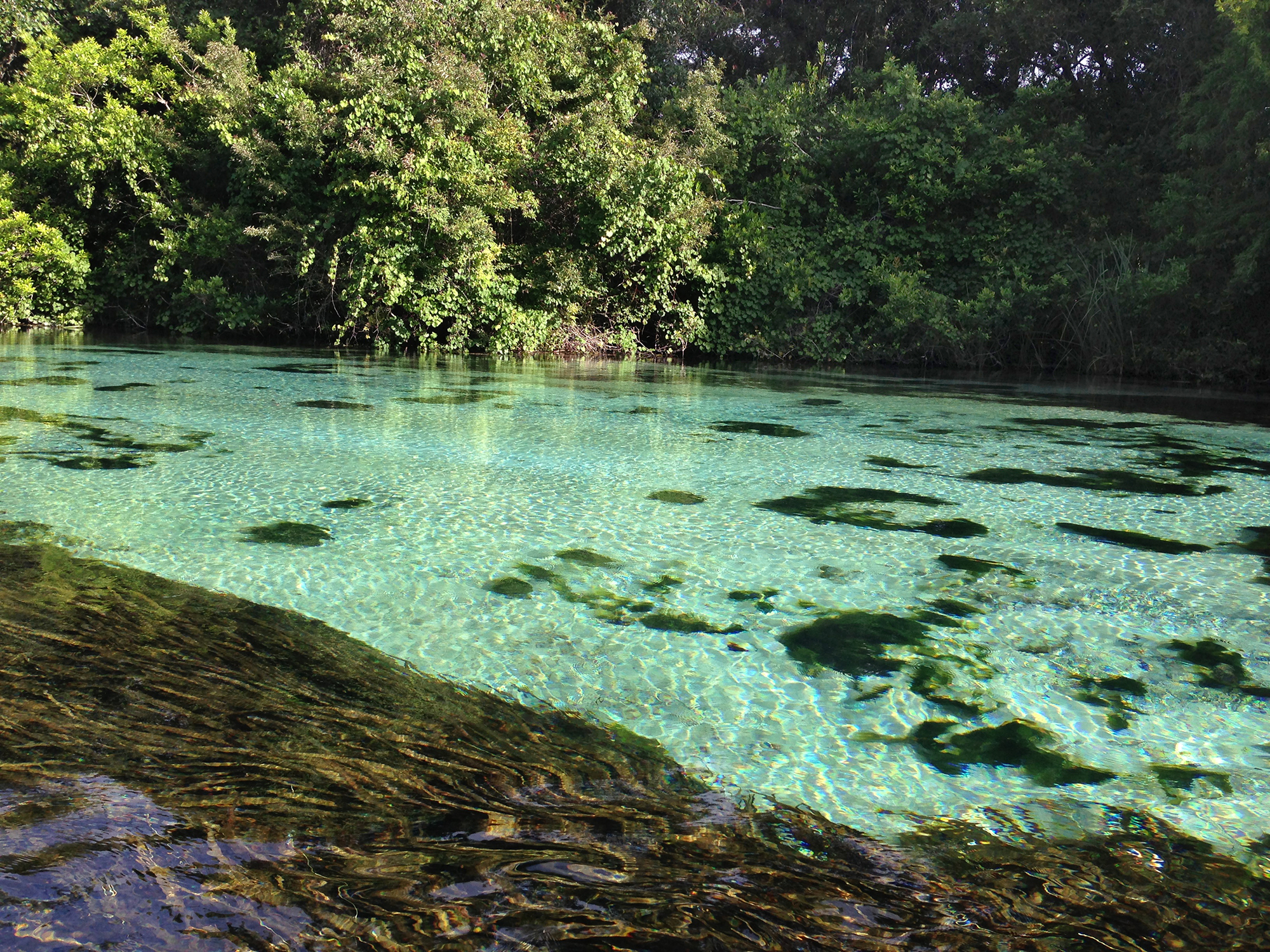
The Weeki Wachee River in the Weeki Wachee Springs State Park.

The Weeki Wachee River is a river in Hernando County, Florida, United States. It flows 12 miles (19 km) westwards from Weeki Wachee to the Gulf of Mexico at the Weeki Wachee estuary. The name is derived from the Seminole: uekiwv /oykéywa, wi:-/ "spring" and -uce /-oci/ "small", signifying either a small spring or an offshoot of a town named Spring. The river is best known for its spring, and the Weeki Wachee Springs attraction built on the premises. The spring is the surfacing point of an underground river, which is the deepest naturally occurring spring in the United States. It measures about 150 feet (46 m) wide and 250 feet (76 m) long, and daily water averages 150 million gallons (644 million liters). The water temperature is a steady 72–74 °F (22–23 °C) year-round.
