= Sarasota Subdivision =

Seaboard Air Line Railroad line in Florida

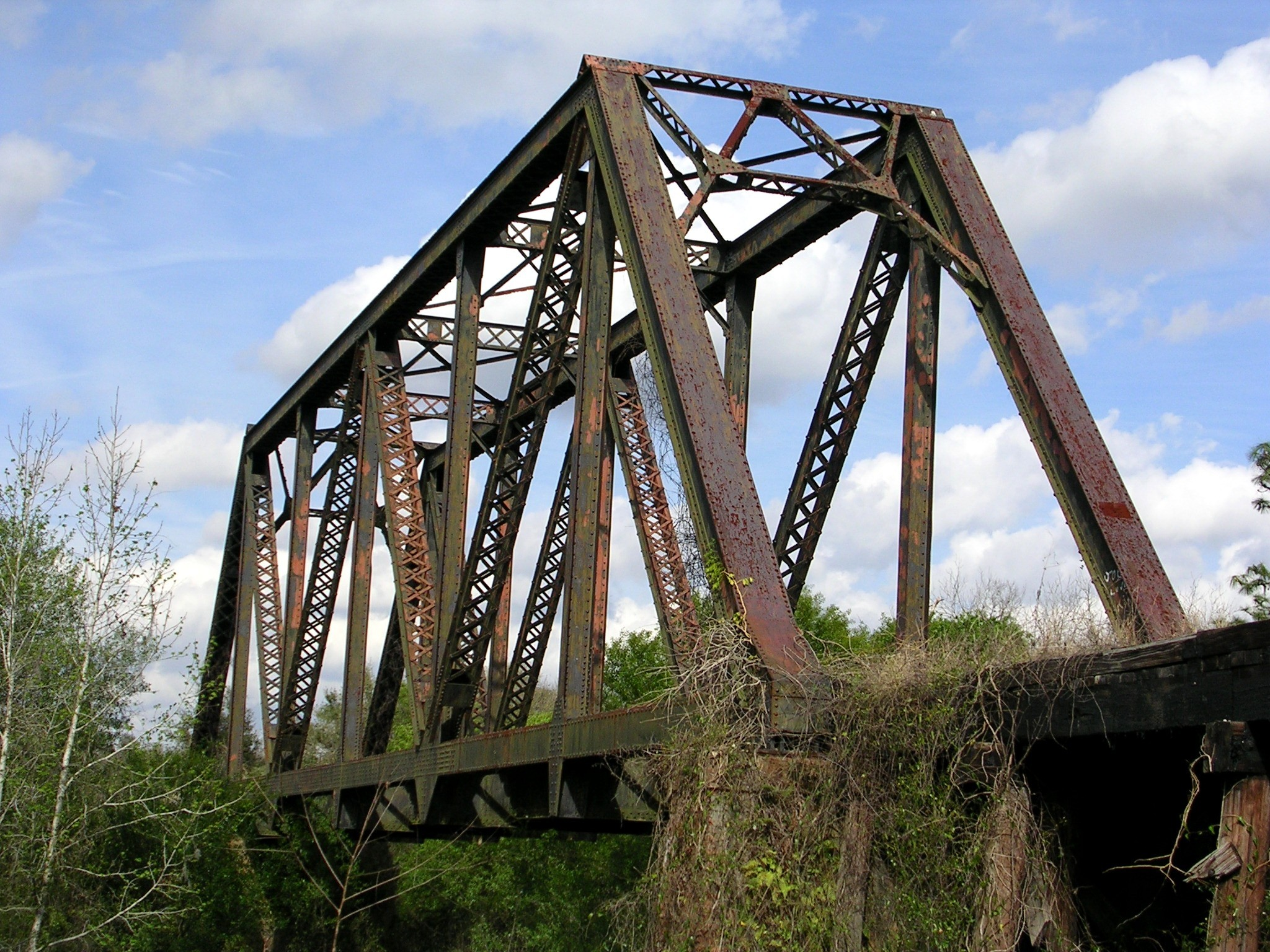

Overview
- Other name: Parrish Subdivision
- Status: Some segments still operating
- Owner: Seaboard Air Line Railroad
- Termini: Turkey Creek, Florida; Venice, Florida

Technical
- Line length: 74 mi (119 km)
- Track gauge: 1,435 mm (4 ft 8 1/2 in) standard gauge
- Electrification: No
- Signalling: None

The Seaboard Air Line Railroad's Sarasota Subdivision (W Line) was a rail line that ran from the company's main line at Turkey Creek south to Palmetto, Bradenton, Sarasota, and Venice. The line was built in phases from 1901 to 1911. Parts of the line are still in service today.

== Route description ==
At its greatest extent, the Sarasota Subdivision began on the Seaboard Air Line Railroad's Main Line in Turkey Creek. From Turkey Creek, it headed south to Durant where it crossed the company's Valrico Subdivision. It continued southwest from Durant through Boyette, Wimauma, Parrish, and Ellenton. Between Parrish and Ellenton, a spur ran northwest to the island of Terra Ceia.

In Ellenton, the Sarasota Subdivision turned west to Palmetto before turning back south. Spurs into both Ellenton and Palmetto also existed along the route.

South of Palmetto, the Sarasota Subdivision crossed the Manatee River on a long swing bridge into Bradenton. In Bradenton, a passenger depot was located on 8th Avenue East. South of Bradenton, the line continued south through Oneco and Tallevast to Sarasota, where a passenger depot was located on the northwest corner of Main Street and Lemon Avenue. South of the Sarasota depot, the line ran south through Downtown Sarasota along Lemon Avenue and Pineapple Avenue, and east along Alderman Street. It continued east through the community of Fruitville before turning south through Bee Ridge, Osprey, Laurel, and Nokomis before entering Venice. A passenger depot was located along Venice Avenue. The line's terminus in Venice was at a wye a short distance south of the passenger depot.

== History ==
=== Early years ===
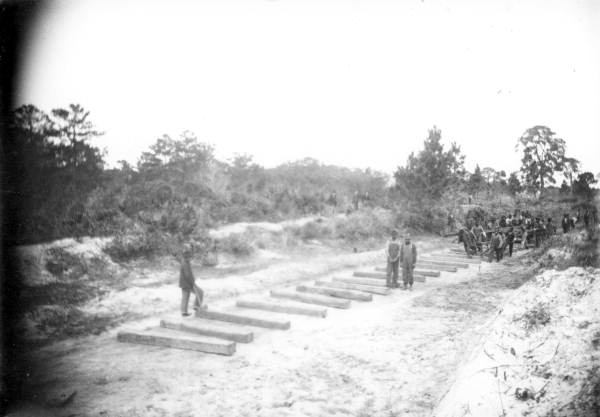
Track being laid near Sixth Street in Sarasota in 1902

The Sarasota Subdivision was one of the first major expansions of the Seaboard Air Line Railroad network in Florida. All of Seaboard's lines in Florida prior to this were part of the Florida Central and Peninsular Railroad (FC&P) network, which the Seaboard acquired in 1900. The northernmost five miles of the line were built in 1892 by the FC&P as a spur to Durant.

The Seaboard Air Line organized a subsidiary United States & West Indies Railroad and Steamship Company in 1901 to oversee construction of a branch line to Sarasota. In 1901, construction commenced from the spur in Durant south to Willow, Palmetto, Bradenton (known then as Bradentown), and Sarasota. Some of the line would run along the former right of way of the Arcadia, Gulf Coast and Lakeland Railroad, an earlier unsuccessful railroad between Bradenton and Sarasota. Spurs were also built to Terra Ceia, and into the central areas of Ellenton, Palmetto, and Bradenton.

The Seaboard Air Line operated the line's first train to Sarasota on March 23, 1903. Upon completion, the United States & West Indies Railroad and Steamship Company was renamed the Florida West Shore Railway. By 1905, the line was extended east from downtown into Fruitville. In 1909, Seaboard fully acquired the Florida West Shore Railway subsidiary, ending the Florida West Shore Railway's separate corporate identity.

=== Extension to Venice ===
The Seaboard Air Line extended the line south to Venice in 1911 after being convinced by local socialite Bertha Honoré Palmer who owned land in Venice. In Venice, the line connected with a small logging railroad operated by the Manasota Lumber Co. The extension to Venice greatly benefited the city's economy. The railroad would be used by cadets and faculty of the Kentucky Military Institute's Venice campus for winter classes from 1933 to 1970. It also transported patients to Fred H. Albee's Florida Medical Center from 1932 to 1942 and transported goods and servicemen to Venice Army Air Field during World War II. Another major customer on the line would be the Ringling Bros. and Barnum & Bailey Circus, which was headquartered in Sarasota from 1927 to 1959 and then in Venice from 1959 to 1990.

By 1925, at the height of the Florida land boom of the 1920s, Seaboard considered extending the line further south through Englewood along Lemon Bay to Placida. In Placida, it would have connected with their Boca Grande Subdivision (the former Charlotte Harbor and Northern Railway). The company planned to create a subsidiary, the Venice Englewood and Southern Railway, to oversee the extension. However, the extension was never built due to the collapse of the land boom at the end of the decade.

=== Later years ===
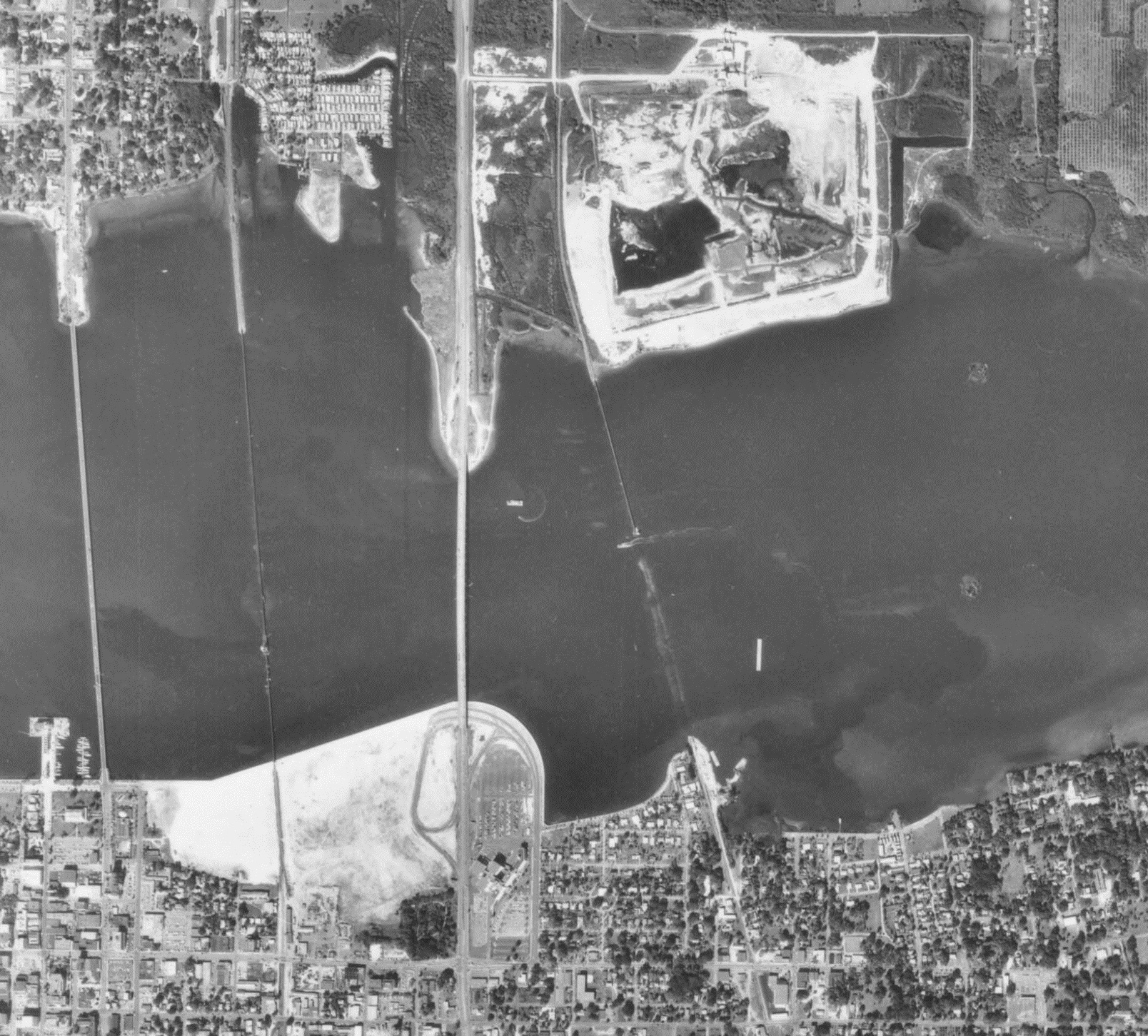
1970 Aerial image of Bradenton. The Seaboard Air Line's former bridge and right of way are visible just to the east of the Desoto Bridge

By the 1940s, the Seaboard Air Line removed the segment between the main line at Turkey Creek and Durant at the north end. The Seaboard's Valrico Cutoff, which was built in 1925 and crossed the Sarasota Subdivision at Durant, was then used to access the line and provided a slightly shorter route to Tampa. By then, two local passenger trains were running the line daily in addition to a through freight train from Durant to Palmetto which ran six days a week.

The SAL ran a section of its Silver Meteor from Tampa to Bradenton, Sarasota and Venice on the line. The Silver Meteor offered through coaches and sleepers (no transfer needed) from New York City on this section.

In 1967, the Seaboard Air Line (SAL) merged with their rival, the Atlantic Coast Line Railroad (ACL), who operated a nearly parallel line between Tampa and Sarasota (the Tampa Southern Railroad). The merged company was named the Seaboard Coast Line Railroad (SCL) and within a year, they began consolidating the operation of the two lines. The Silver Meteor was discontinued in April 1968 and the Champion (an ex-ACL passenger service) was extended south to Venice. SAL track was abandoned from 12th Street through Downtown Sarasota to Shade Avenue and ACL track was abandoned from Shade Avenue east. The line was still designated as the Sarasota Subdivision from Durant to Sarasota, while the line from Sarasota to Venice was annexed to the Palmetto Subdivision, the designation given to the ex-ACL route from Tampa to Sarasota.

By the end of 1968, the Sarasota Subdivision was abandoned between Palmetto Junction and Bradenton Junction which included the swing bridge over the Manatee River, consolidating the company's operation on to a single bridge crossing (the ex-ACL bridge). By then, the Sarasota Subdivision name was retired and the remaining track south Bradenton was redesignated as part of the Palmetto Subdivision. The remaining Sarasota Subdivision from Palmetto to Durant was renamed the Parrish Subdivision, which by then was a freight-only route. The Seaboard's bridge over the Manatee River was demolished in 1971.

In 1970, the Parrish Subdivision became the original route of the Tropicana Juice Train which brought fresh orange juice in insulated boxcars from Bradenton to Kearny, New Jersey six days a week. Seaboard Coast Line would later reroute the juice train through Tampa on the Palmetto Subdivision (former Atlantic Coast Line) where it operates today.

Passenger service was discontinued in the Sarasota area after the Seaboard Coast Line's passenger operations were taken over by Amtrak in 1971.

In 1980, the Seaboard Coast Line's parent company merged with the Chessie System, creating the CSX Corporation. The CSX Corporation initially operated the Chessie and Seaboard Systems separately until 1986, when they were merged into CSX Transportation. In 1986, in an effort to further consolidate the network, track was abandoned between Durant and Willow. However, the bridge over the Little Manatee River still stands with the tracks removed.

== Current conditions ==
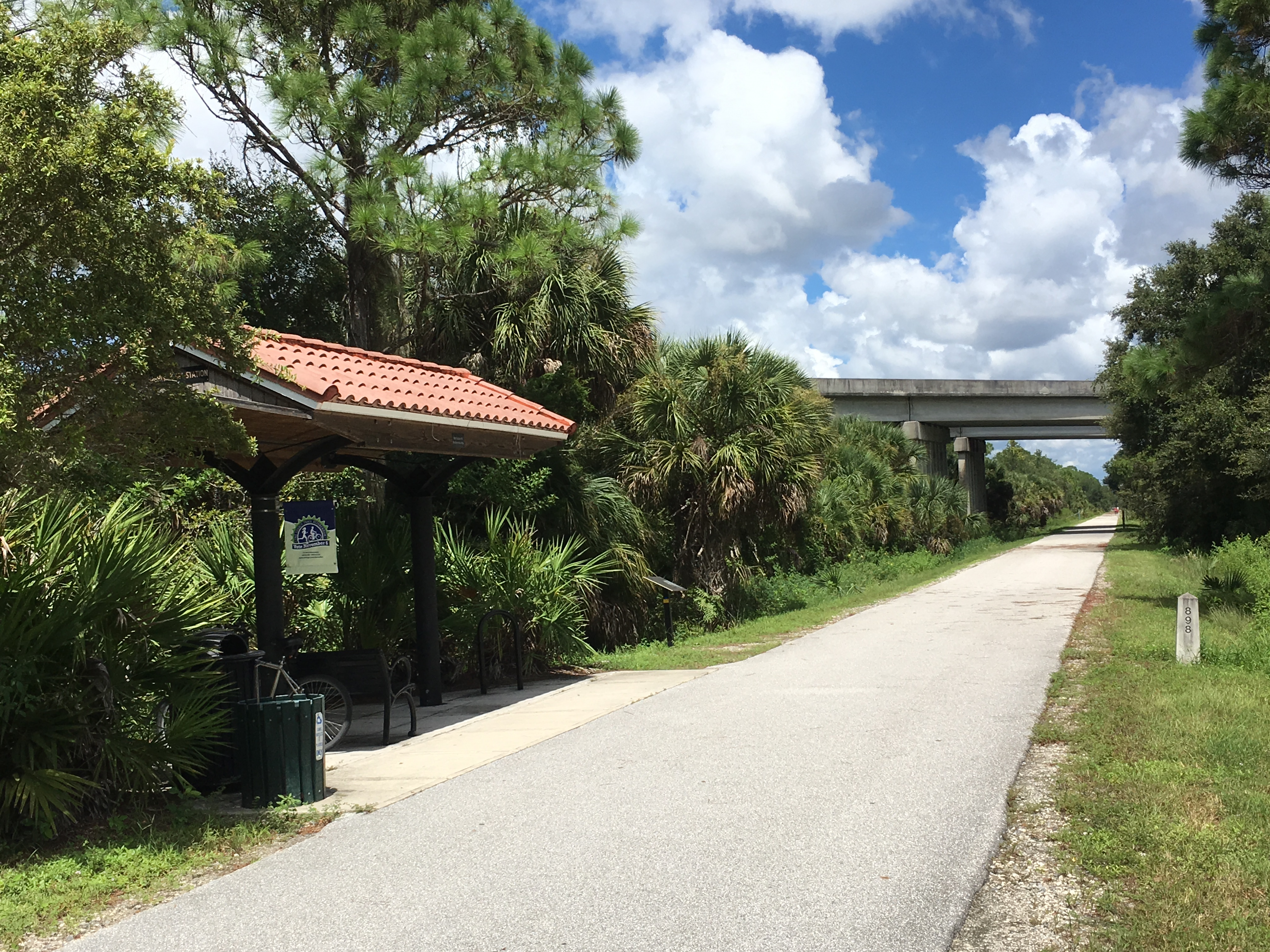
Legacy Trail on the former Venice extension right of way at mile marker 898. The trail's mile markers use the same numbers as the railroad.

From Willow to Palmetto, the line is still in service as CSX's Parrish Spur. The former spur in Palmetto now connects the line to the Palmetto Subdivision main track (the ex-ACL line). The right of way of the Parrish Spur north and east of Ellenton is now largely owned by Florida Power and Light, and the Florida Railroad Museum operates excursion trains on this segment from Parrish to Willow.

The remaining line from Parrish to Willow and the abandoned right of way from there to just north of Durant is also significant in Tampa aviation. It is used to identify the southeastern boundary of Tampa International Airport's Class B airspace between 3,000 and 6,000 feet.

South of Bradenton, CSX continues to operates the line as part of their Palmetto Subdivision from the north end of Tropicana Yard south to Oneco. The short line Seminole Gulf Railway took over the rest of the remaining line south of Oneco to Venice in 1987. Seminole Gulf abandoned the line from Venice to Palmer Ranch in 2004, and the line from there to Sarasota was abandoned in 2019. The Legacy Trail now runs on the former right of way from the Venice Depot to Fruitville Road in Sarasota. The remaining right of way south of the Venice Depot is now home to the Venice Urban Forest.

== Historic stations ==
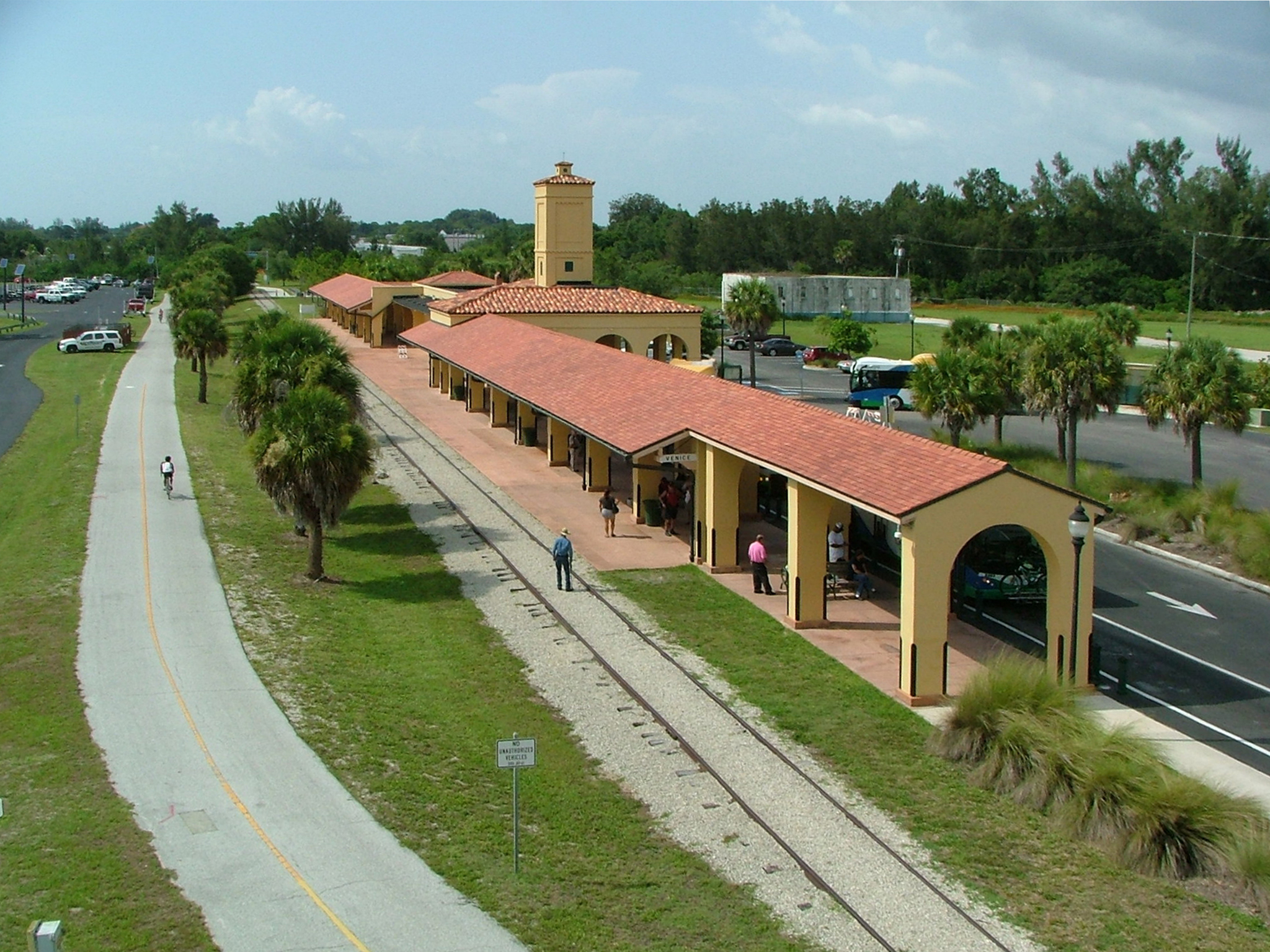
Venice Depot

Turkey Creek to Venice
Milepost (Note: When first built, the Seaboard Air Line (SAL) gave the Sarasota Subdivision the milepost prefix W. After the 1967 merger, the Seaboard Coast Line (SCL) added S to the beginning of all ex-SAL lines, making the prefix SW.)	City/Location	Station	Connections and notes
SW 828.6	Turkey Creek	Turkey Creek	junction with Seaboard Air Line Railroad Main Line
SW 832.8	Durant	Durant	junction with Seaboard Air Line Railroad Valrico Subdivision
SW 839.8	Boyette	Boyette	
SW 844.6	Balm	Balm	
SW 848.2	Wimauma	Wimauma	
SW 854.0	Willow	Willow	
SW 860.2	Parrish	Parrish	
SW 863.8		Erie	
SW 867.2	Rubonia	Terra Ceia Junction	junction with Terra Ceia Spur (see below)
SW 869.1		Ellenton Junction	junction with Ellenton Spur
SWB 869.3		Ellenton	located on Ellenton Spur
SW 870.2	Palmetto	Palmetto Junction	junction with Palmetto Spur
SWC 871.5	Palmetto	Palmetto	located on Palmetto Spur
SW 870.8	Manavista	Manavista	
SW 872.4	Bradenton	Bradenton Junction	junction with Bradenton Spur
SWD 873.8	Bradenton	Bradenton (freight station)	located on Bradenton Spur
SW 872.5	Bradenton	Bradenton (passenger station)	also known as Bradenton-Manatee junction with: East and West Coast Railway (SAL); Tampa Southern Railroad (ACL)
SW 875.8	Oneco	Oneco	
SW 877.7	Tallevast	Tallevast	
SW 883.4	Sarasota	Sarasota	
SW 886.4	Fruitville	Fruitville	
SW 890.0	Bee Ridge	Bee Ridge	
SW 894.9	Osprey	Osprey	
SW 900.1	Laurel	Laurel	
SW 901.3	Nokomis	Nokomis	
SW 902.6	Venice	Venice	

Terra Ceia Spur
Milepost	City/Location	Station	Connections and notes
SWA 867.2	Rubonia	Terra Ceia Junction	junction with Sarasota Subdivision
SWA 869.8	Rubonia	Rubonia	
SWA 871.7	Terra Ceia	Terra Ceia	
