= Palmetto Subdivision =

CSX railroad line in Florida

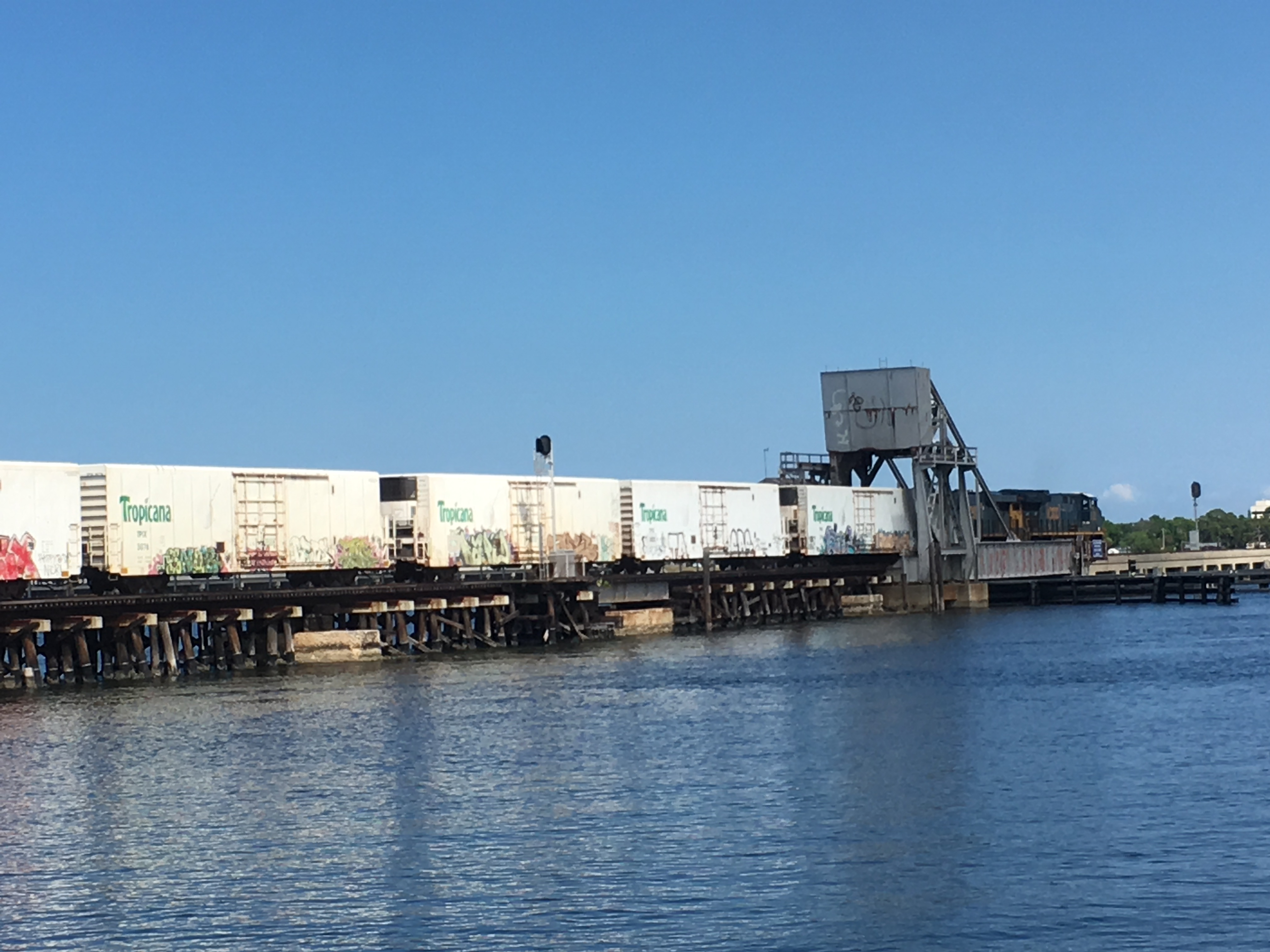
CSX train O823 pulling Tropicana Juice cars across the Manatee River Bridge in Bradenton in 2018.

The Palmetto Subdivision is a CSX Transportation rail line in the Tampa Bay region of Florida. It runs from just south of Tampa south to Bradenton.

== Route description ==
The north end of the Palmetto Subdivision is in East Tampa just north of the Alafia River, where it continues south from CSX's Tampa Terminal Subdivision. From East Tampa, it runs south and roughly parallels U.S. Route 41 through Ruskin to Palmetto. South of Palmetto, it crosses the Manatee River on a bascule bridge and enters Bradenton. After passing through downtown Bradenton, the Palmetto Subdivision ends just south of Tropicana Yard in Oneco, where it connects with the Seminole Gulf Railway, a shortline that continues south into Sarasota.

The line notably serves The Mosaic Company's Riverview phosphate plant near the Alafia River, TECO Energy's Big Bend Power Station in southern Hillsoborough County, and Port Manatee in northern Manatee County. It also serves the Tropicana Juice Plant in Bradenton, with Tropicana's Juice Train continuing to be the most consistent service on the line today.

=== Parrish Spur ===
The Parrish Spur branches off the line in Palmetto and runs northeast to Ellenton, Parrish, and Willow. The line notably serves a Conrad Yelvington Distribution facility in Palmetto. Florida Power and Light owns the right-of-way east of Palmetto with the Florida Railroad Museum operating excursion trains on the line from its base in Parrish to Willow. CSX occasionally operates over the line to Willow to serve FPL's power plant there.

== History ==
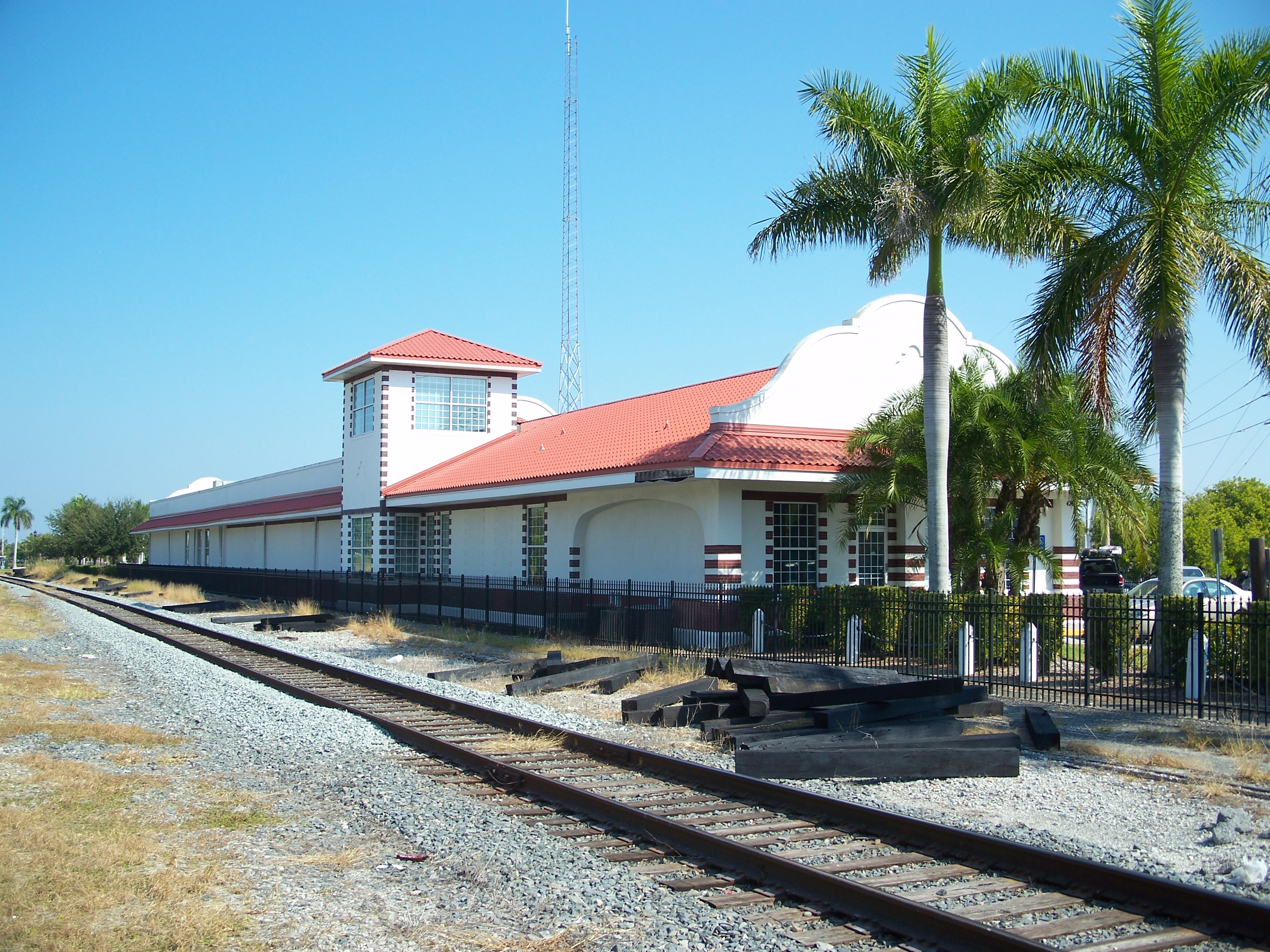
Palmetto Subdivision passing the historic Bradentown depot.

The line from East Tampa to Bradenton was built by the Tampa Southern Railroad, which was first incorporated in 1917 as a subsidiary of the Atlantic Coast Line Railroad (ACL). The Tampa Southern's tracks were completed to Palmetto by December 1918 and to Bradenton by May 1924.

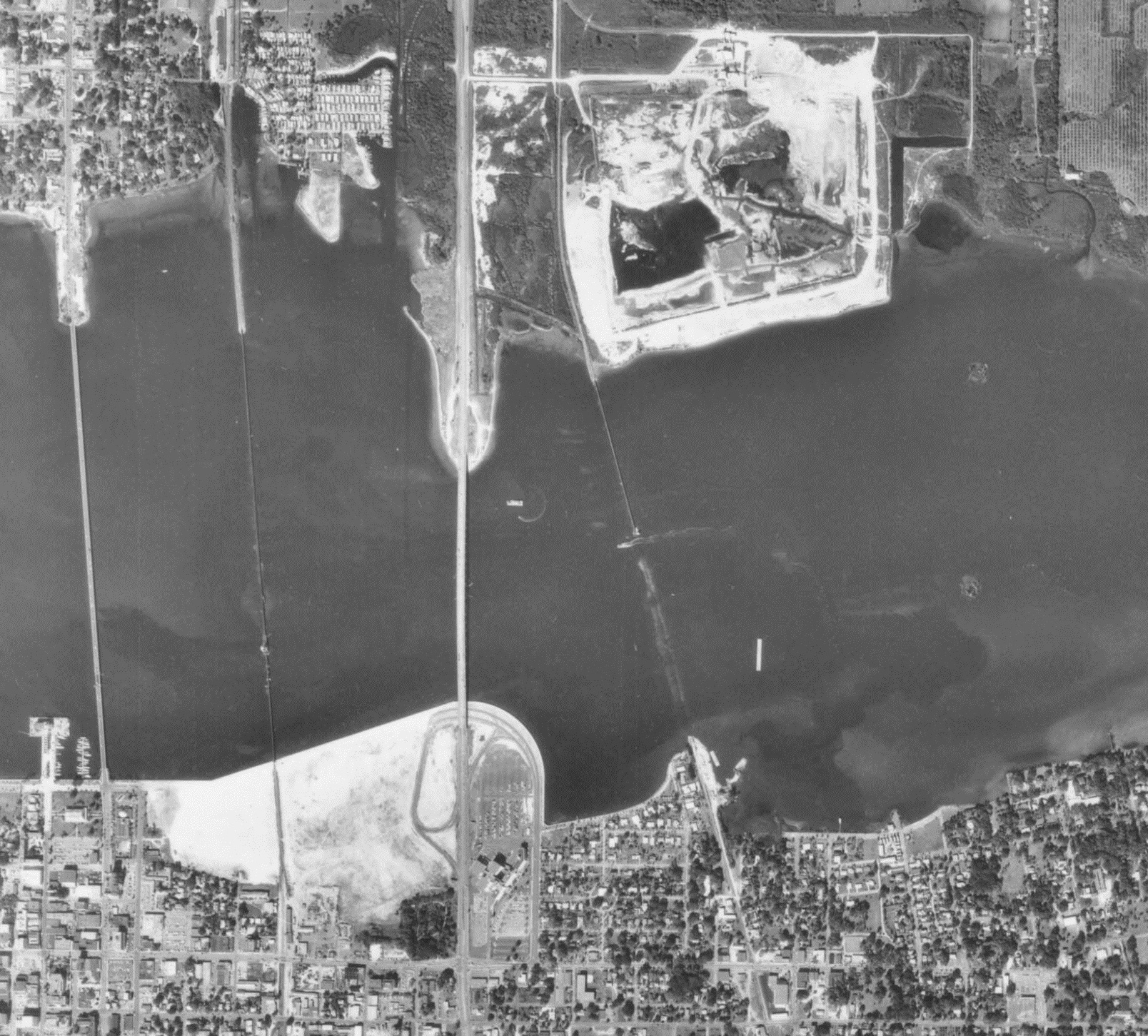
1970 Aerial image of Bradenton showing the Atlantic Coast Line's bascule bridge. Remnants of the Seaboard Air Line's bridge and right of way (which connected what is now the Parrish Spur with Tropicana Yard) are also visible

The Parrish Spur and the track south of Tropicana Yard to Oneco were built earlier in 1903 by the Seaboard Air Line Railroad (SAL), a competitor of the Atlantic Coast Line. This line originally had its own swing bridge over the Manatee River about a half mile east of the current bascule bridge (the Tampa Southern's original bridge).

In 1967, the Seaboard Air Line Railroad and the Atlantic Coast Line Railroad merged to form the Seaboard Coast Line Railroad, which brought all the track under a single owner. The line was first designated as the Palmetto Subdivision after the merger since the SCL adopted the SAL's method of naming lines as subdivisions. Initially, the Palmetto Subdivision ran from Tampa to Sarasota on the ex-ACL line and continued south from Sarasota to Venice on the ex-SAL line. By the end of the decade, the company abandoned the SAL bridge over the Manatee River. Ex-ACL track was also abandoned from Bradenton to Matoaka and the Palmetto Subdivision was rerouted on to the ex-SAL track from Bradenton to Sarasota (which was previously the Sarasota Subdivision).

In 1980, the Seaboard Coast Line's parent company merged with the Chessie System, creating the CSX Corporation. The CSX Corporation initially operated the Chessie and Seaboard Systems separately until 1986, when they were merged into CSX Transportation. The same year, the Parrish Spur (which operated as the Parrish Subdivision under SCL) was abandoned north of Willow to Durant. The Palmetto Subdivision south of Oneco to Sarasota and Venice was taken over by Fort Myers-based Seminole Gulf Railway in 1987.

Today, the mileposts on the former Atlantic Coast Line segments have an AZA prefix, and the Seaboard Air Line segments have an SW prefix.

== See also ==
- List of CSX Transportation lines
