= Regional assemblies =

Regional assembly may refer to:

- Regional assembly (Czech Republic) (Zastupitelstvo kraje) of regions of the Czech Republic
- Eastern Rumelian Regional Assembly (or Parliament), of the autonomous Ottoman province of Eastern Rumelia (in modern Bulgaria); the Plovdiv Regional Historical Museum now occupies the building
- Regional assembly (England)
- Regional assembly (Eritrea)
- Regional assembly (Ethiopia), of the nine ethnically-based administrative Regions of Ethiopia
- Conseil régional (regional council, or regional assembly), see Regional councils of France
- Regional assemblies of the Regierungsbezirk of Germany
- Regional assembly (Ireland)
- Regional assemblies of ancient Macedon, see Macedon#Regional districts (Merides)
- ARMM Regional Legislative Assembly, Autonomous Region in Muslim Mindanao, Philippines, see Autonomous Region in Muslim Mindanao#Politics
- Regional Assembly of Parliamentarians of the Organisation of Eastern Caribbean States, to be created by the Economic Union Treaty
- Provincial assemblies of Pakistan, legislative bodies in the provinces and regions of Pakistan
- Assembleia Legislativa (Legislative Assemblies, or Parliaments) of the two Autonomous regions of Portugal: the Azores and Madeira
- Regional Assembly of Príncipe, since autonomy was granted within São Tomé and Príncipe in 1994
- South Tyrol Regional Assembly, Italy
- Southern Regional Assembly in Sudan, created by the Addis Ababa Agreement (1972), see History of Sudan (Nimeiri Era, 1969-1985)

== See also ==
- Cornish Assembly
- Regional Assemblies (Preparations) Act 2003, England
- Regional planning council (Florida), United States
- Assembly (disambiguation)
- Other types of deliberative assembly:
  - Legislative assembly
  - National Assembly
  - Thing (assembly)
