= Palmetto Estuary Preserve =

Nature preserve in Florida, United States

- Palmetto Estuary Park, Palmetto Estuary Preservation Project
- IUCN category V (protected landscape/seascape)
- Interactive map of Palmetto Estuary Preserve
- Location: Palmetto, Florida
- Coordinates: 27°30′46″N 82°33′50″W
- Area: 20 acres (0.081 km^{2})
- Established: 1998
- Governing body: Palmetto, Florida

Palmetto Estuary Preserve (or Palmetto Estuary Park) is a 20-acre (8.1 ha) preserve in Palmetto, Florida. The preserve is located directly north of the Hernando de Soto Bridge and abuts the Manatee River.

== Overview ==
Palmetto acquired the land as part of a land swap in the 1990s for the construction of Riviera Dunes, located on the eastern side of US 41 / US 301. The ecological restoration of the area was done by Ecosphere Restoration Institute, a Tampa-based nonprofit organization. The project was the first public-private habitat restoration in the Tampa Bay region and awarded Environmental Project of the Year by the Tampa Bay Regional Planning Council in 2002.

A 50-kilowatt (67 hp) solar canopy was constructed at its northern parking lot in 2016 as a partnership between Florida Power & Light and the city of Palmetto.
