= Tampa Southern Railroad =

Historic railroad line in Florida

- Route of the Tampa Southern Railroad at its greatest extent

Overview
- Reporting mark: TAS
- Dates of operation: 1917–1967
- Successor: Atlantic Coast Line Railroad; Seaboard Coast Line Railroad; CSX Transportation

Technical
- Track gauge: 4 ft 8 1/2 in (1,435 mm) standard gauge

The Tampa Southern Railroad was a subsidiary of the Atlantic Coast Line Railroad (ACL) originally running from Uceta Yard in Tampa south to Palmetto, Bradenton, and Sarasota with a later extension southeast to Fort Ogden in the Peace River valley built shortly after. It was one of many rail lines completed during the 1920s Florida land boom. It was later known as the Atlantic Coast Line's Tampa—Southfort Line and Tampa—Sarasota Line on employee timetables. Most of the remaining trackage (between Tampa and Bradenton) now serves as CSX Transportation's Palmetto Subdivision. Another short portion just east of Sarasota also remains that is now operated by Seminole Gulf Railway.

== Route description ==
The Tampa Southern Railroad began just east of Downtown Tampa. It branched off the Atlantic Coast Line Railroad's main line just west of Uceta Yard and headed south. It ran along Tampa Bay south crossing the Palm River and Alafia River before passing through Gibsonton, Apollo Beach, and Ruskin. At Piney Point, it turned south toward the city of Palmetto. It then crossed the Manatee River into Bradenton, where a passenger depot was located just south of the river.

On the south side of Bradenton, the line turned southeast and crossed the Seaboard Air Line Railroad's Sarasota Subdivision before turning back south through Oneco and Matoaka. It then entered Sarasota, where a passenger depot was located at Main Street. South of the Sarasota depot, the line turned east and ran directly beside the Seaboard Air Line Railroad's Sarasota Subdivision a short distance through Fruitville.

At its greatest extent, the line continued beyond Fruitville southeast, passing through Utopia before crossing the Myakka River and continuing through Honore and Sidell. It crossed the Seaboard Air Line Railroad's Boca Grande Subdivision at Platt. The line then crossed Peace River just before merging with the Atlantic Coast Line's Lakeland—Fort Myers Line at Southfort (just south of Fort Ogden).

== History ==
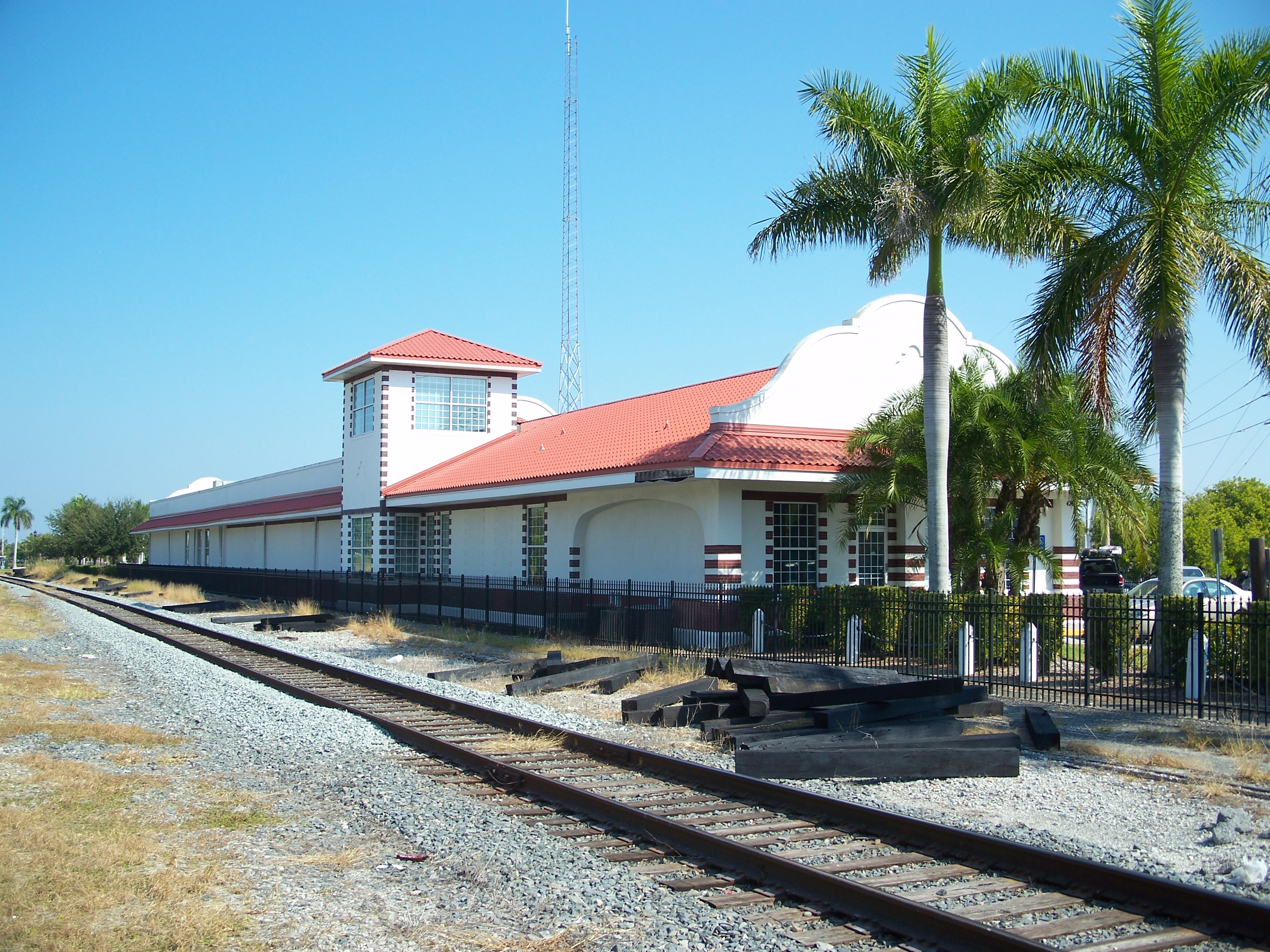
Former Bradenton passenger depot, which is now a medical clinic

The Tampa Southern Railroad was chartered on January 31, 1917, and incorporated on March 5, 1917, as a subsidiary of the Atlantic Coast Line Railroad (ACL), who already had a sizeable network in Florida. The officers of the new company were all ACL officers, and were reelected at several subsequent shareholders meetings. The Tampa Southern would principally compete with the Seaboard Air Line Railroad's parallel Sarasota Subdivision that ran from Durant to Venice which had been serving Bradenton and Sarasota since 1903.

The Tampa Southern's crews began work soon after incorporation and the company's leadership projected that trains could be running by the start of 1918. Bradenton granted a right-of-way through its city and land for a station and other supporting structures there in early January 1918. The first train from Tampa to Palmetto ran on December 5, 1918. The railroad reached Bradenton and used it as its terminus, carrying through Pullman sleepers from connecting Atlantic Coast Line trains. The tracks were completed to Sarasota by May 1924, and the first passenger train arrived in Sarasota in December of that year.

The Tampa Southern began at the ACL's Uceta Yard in Tampa and ran south, paralleling the east shore of Tampa Bay. Just northeast of Palmetto, a loop was constructed through Ellenton to serve agricultural growers. Known as the "Ellenton Belt Line", the now abandoned loop branched off the main line near Rubonia and ran in a roughly rectangular trajectory through Ellenton before returning to the main line in Palmetto. A short spur to Terra Ceia, which is now abandoned, also existed near this area.

South of Palmetto, the tracks crossed a trestle across the Manatee River and entered Bradenton. Bradenton's passenger depot (which still stands today and serves as a medical clinic) was built just south of the river. The tracks then turned southeast for a short distance and crossed the SAL's track before turning south again and into Sarasota near Fruitville.

In 1928, a spur to the Payne Terminal at Hog Creek was built just north of the Sarasota passenger depot (which was located at Main Street and School Avenue). The Seaboard Air Line attempted to block the ACL from accessing the terminal since it had three spur tracks there that the ACL would have to cross. Since these spurs were on city property, the city authorized their removal so the ACL could build their spur to the terminal.

=== Extension to Fort Ogden ===
With optimism for the company's petition to the Interstate Commerce Commission, in 1925 surveyors were plotting a line beyond Sarasota to connect with Florida's east coast. By 1927, the line was extended southeast from Sarasota to a point near Fort Ogden on the Peace River in Desoto County. The extension included a spur to the Ringling Bros. and Barnum & Bailey Circus Sarasota headquarters near Fruitville. The extension also served Palmer Farms and their packinghouse at Belspur. Adrian Honore, brother of local socialite Bertha Honore Palmer, also owned significant amounts of land along the line east of Sarasota.

While freight was the primary intent of the Fort Ogden extension, it ended up having the additional benefit of providing a direct route for passenger trains traveling from Tampa and Sarasota further down the coast to Fort Myers and Naples. The extension would initially serve a pair of passenger trains from Tampa Union Station to Fort Myers and Naples that included through Pullman coaches from the Dixie Limited and the Palmetto.

Most of the Fort Ogden extension was removed by 1949 since it did not generate the freight traffic the Atlantic Coast Line had hoped for. The line was truncated at Belspur just east of Fruitville.

=== Later years ===
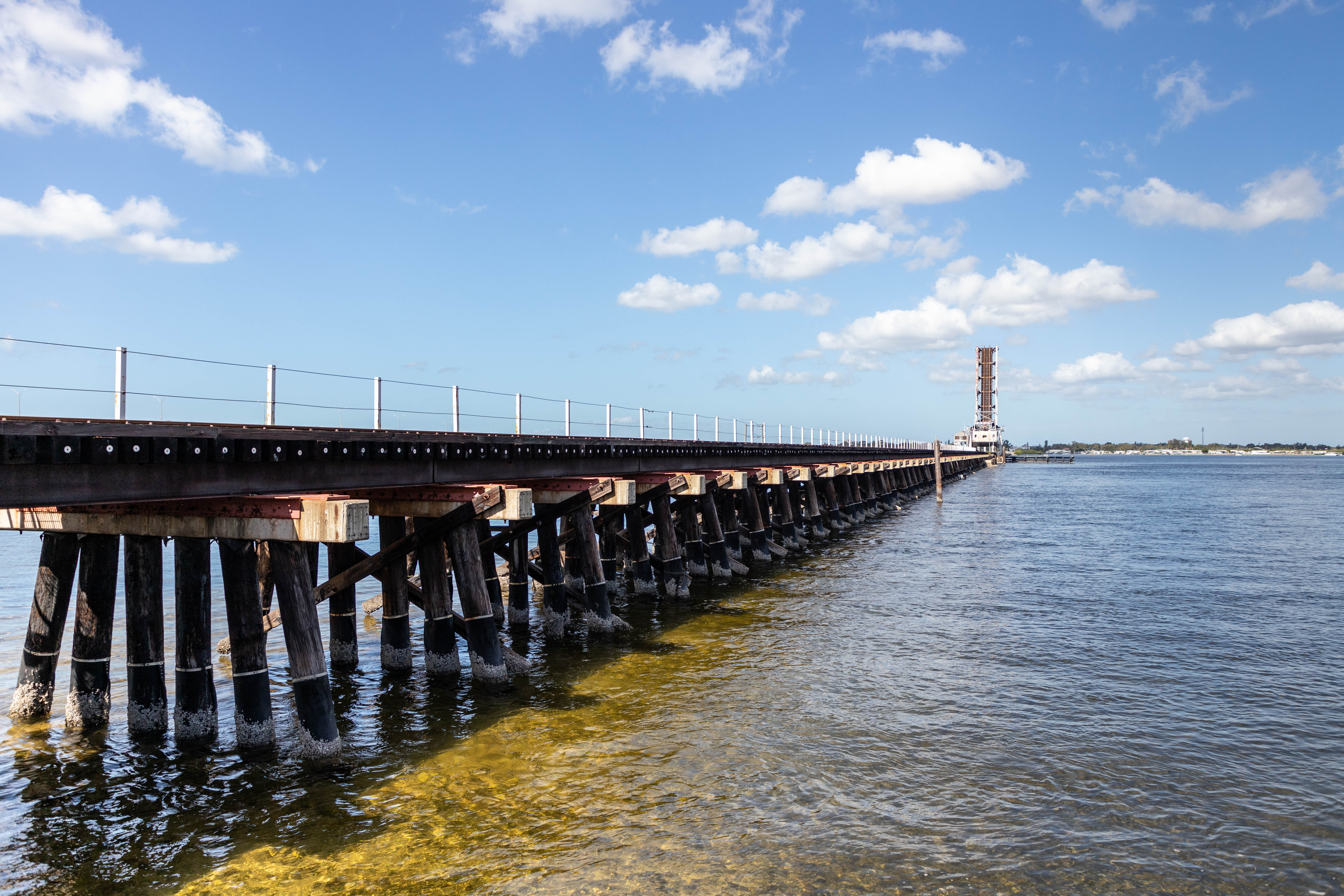
Bascule bridge over the Manatee River

By 1949, the line had daily service from Tampa Union Station to Sarasota by the Atlantic Coast Line's West Coast Champion as well as a daily local passenger train. Two freight trains also ran to Sarasota six days a week.

In 1956, the swing span on the Manatee River trestle was replaced with the current bascule span. The bascule span was installed about 200 feet north of where the swing span was located and the Army Corps of Engineers realigned the navigation channel to pass through the new bascule.

In 1967, the Atlantic Coast Line Railroad merged with the Seaboard Air Line Railroad (SAL) to form the Seaboard Coast Line Railroad (SCL). In the wake of the merger, connections were established between the Tampa Southern and the Seaboard's Sarasota Subdivision in a number of locations. The east-west segment of the Tampa Southern Line south of the Sarasota depot through Fruitville was quickly abandoned and consolidated with the ex-SAL track directly beside it. The SCL would designate the former Tampa Southern line from Tampa to just south of the Sarasota depot (as well as ex-SAL track from there to Venice) as the Palmetto Subdivision. The Tampa Southern track from Fruitville to Belspur would remain as a spur until the late 1970s.

The merger also resulted in the closure of the SAL's swing bridge over the Manatee River in 1968, leaving the Tampa Southern's bridge as the only route across the Manatee River. The city of Bradenton unsuccessfully attempted to have the Seaboard Coast Line remove the Tampa Southern bridge instead since it went right through downtown Bradenton's waterfront. By the end of the decade, the company also abandoned former Tampa Southern track from Bradenton to Matoaka leaving the ex-SAL route as the only through route to Sarasota. Track south of Matoaka would remain as a spur from Sarasota.

The line from Tampa to Palmetto became the primary route through the area since it provided a direct route to the Tampa yards. The Champion continued to run the line and continued south to Venice after the merger. All passenger service ended in 1971 after all of the Seaboard Coast Line's passenger operations were taken over by Amtrak. The line would later become the route of Tropicana's Juice Train, which was originally operated on the former Seaboard Air Line tracks to bypass Tampa. The juice train continues to run the line today.

At the north end, the line was connected with the S Line (the former SAL main line) into Yeoman Yard, the Seaboard Air Line's classification yard that subsequently became the Seaboard Coast Line's main yard. Uceta Yard, the Atlantic Coast Line's main yard, has since become an intermodal terminal and car storage facility. The connection with the A Line (the former ACL main line) was severed after the cessation of passenger service.

In 1980, the Seaboard Coast Line's parent company merged with the Chessie System, creating the CSX Corporation. The CSX Corporation initially operated the Chessie and Seaboard Systems separately until 1986, when they were merged into CSX Transportation. The Seaboard Air Line's original route between Durant and Willow was then removed in 1986, leaving the Tampa Southern route as the only thru route.

== Current conditions ==
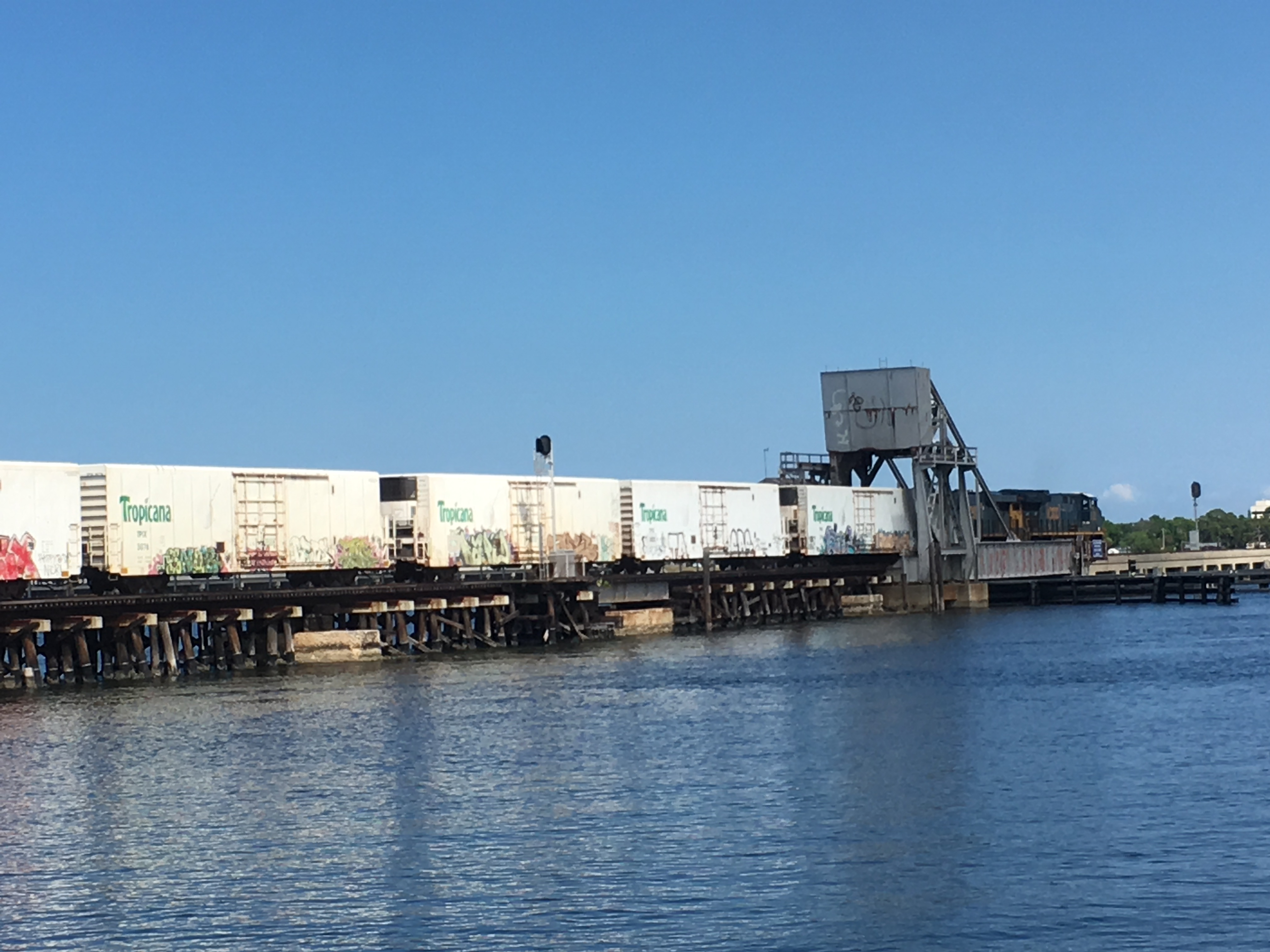
CSX pulling the Tropicana Juice Train across the Manatee River Bridge in Bradenton in 2018. Concrete footings from the bridge's former swing span are visible under the trestle.

Most of the remaining Tampa Southern Railroad trackage from Tampa to Bradenton comprises CSX's Palmetto Subdivision, with the northernmost five miles being part of the Tampa Terminal Subdivision. A control point on the line between State Road 60 and Yeoman Yard is named "TS," a reference to the Tampa Southern.

The line today serves The Mosaic Company's Riverview plant near the Alafia River, TECO Energy's Big Bend Power Station in southern Hillsborough County, and Port Manatee in northern Manatee County. It also continues to serve the Tropicana Juice Plant in Bradenton, with Tropicana's Juice Train continuing to be the most consistent service on the line today.

The main Tampa Southern Railroad tracks end near the Tropicana Plant in Bradenton; the Palmetto Subdivision continues south from here a short distance to Oneco along the former Seaboard line. In Oneco, it connects with Seminole Gulf Railway, who operates the remaining Seaboard tracks south through Sarasota. Seminole Gulf also operates a discontinuous segment of the Tampa Southern Railroad just east of Downtown Sarasota. It is part of their track from Sarasota to Matoaka. US 301 now runs on the roughly five-mile abandoned segment of the Tampa Southern between Bradenton and Matoaka.

Additionally, Desoto County Road 761 runs along the southernmost 2.5 miles of the abandoned right of way of the Fort Ogden extension.

== Historic Stations ==
| Milepost (Note: When first built, the Atlantic Coast Line Railroad (ACL) gave the Tampa Southern line the milepost prefix ZA. After the 1967 merger, the Seaboard Coast Line (SCL) added A to the beginning of all ex-ACL lines, making the prefix AZA.) | City/Location | Station | Image | Connections and notes |
|---|---|---|---|---|
| A 881.7 | Tampa | Tampa Union Station | | located on Atlantic Coast Line Railroad Main Line |
| A 879.8; AZA 879.8 | Tampa | Uceta | | junction with: Atlantic Coast Line Railroad Main Line; Seaboard Air Line Railroad Main Line |
| AZA 881.1 | | Palm | | |
| AZA 885.0 | | East Tampa | | |
| AZA 892.4 | | Mebane | | later renamed North Ruskin |
| AZA 898.3 | | Ruskin | | |
| AZA 901.9 | | Sun City | | |
| AZA 906.5 | | Piney Point | | junction with Port Manatee Railroad |
| AZA 910.0 | | Gillette | | |
| AZA 914.8 | Palmetto | Palmetto | | junction with Seaboard Air Line Railroad Palmetto Spur |
| AZA 916.2 | Bradenton | Bradentown | | later renamed Bradenton junction with Seaboard Air Line Railroad Sarasota Subdivision & Bradenton Spur |
| AZA 920.4 | | Oneco | | |
| AZA 923.4 | | Matoaka | | |
| AZA 928.3 | Sarasota | Sarasota | | demolished in 1986 |
| AZA 932.4 | | East Sarasota | | |
| AZA 934.0 | | Belspur | | |
| AZA 935.1 | | Fordville | | |
| AZA 939.5 | | Utopia | | |
| AZA 946.4 | | Honore | | |
| AZA 955.7 | | Sidell | | |
| AZA 966.2 | | Parkland | | also known as Platt junction with Seaboard Air Line Railroad Boca Grande Subdivision |
| AZA 969.1 | Fort Ogden | Southfort | | junction with Atlantic Coast Line Railroad Lakeland—Fort Myers Line |

== See also ==
- List of CSX Transportation lines
