= Boyette =

Boyette may refer to the following:

== Places ==
- Boyette, Florida, unincorporated community, United States

== People ==
- Garland Boyette (1940–2022), American football player
- Keith Boyette, American pastor in the Global Methodist Church
- Mike Boyette (1941–2012), American professional wrestler
- Pat Boyette (1923–2000), American broadcasting personality, news producer, and comic book artist
- Re'quan Boyette (born 1986), American college football coach and former player
- Griffin Boyette Bell (1918–2009), American lawyer and former Attorney General

== Films ==
- Boyette: Not a Girl Yet, 2020 Philippine comedy film
