= Edward Medard Park and Reservoir =

Edward Medard Reservoir
- Location within Florida Location within the United States
- Location: Plant City, Hillsborough County, Florida
- Coordinates: 27°55′52″N 82°10′08″W
- Type: reservoir
- Basin countries: United States
- Managing agency: Hillsborough County Parks and Recreation Department
- Designation: Fisheries Management Area
- Built: 1970
- Surface area: 770 acres (3.1 km^{2})
- Average depth: 6.36 ft (1.94 m)
- Max. depth: 21.48 ft (6.55 m)
- Water volume: 1,474,561,838 US gallons (1.228 billion imperial gallons; 5.582 cubic hectometres)
- Shore length^{1}: 115,290 ft (35,140 m)
- Surface elevation: 58.52 ft (17.84 m)
- ^{1} Shore length is not a well-defined measure.

Edward Medard Park and Preserve, originally known as Pleasant Grove Reservoir Park, is located south of Plant City, Florida, on Turkey Creek Road in Hillsborough County, Florida. The 1,284-acre (5.20 km^{2}) park just north of Durant, Florida was the site of phosphate mining in the 1960s by the American Cyanamid Company, before the land was donated (largely in 1969). A dike and 770-acre (3.1 km^{2}) reservoir were created in 1970 to provide flood protection along the Alafia River. The lake has a very extensive and irregular shoreline, and great variation is found in the lake bottom as well. The park is maintained by the Hillsborough County Parks and Recreation Department, and has camping, picknicking, and other facilities. Three long piers offer the ability to launch fairly large vessels, although the lake has a no-wake restriction. Additional opportunities for various sports and aquatic activities are available at the popular spot which attracts approximately 250,000 visitors a year.

The park and reservoir were renamed in 1977 in honor of Edward Medard, a governing board member of the Southwest Florida Water Management District.

== Reconstruction and restocking ==
In the early 2000s, the Alafia Basin Board determined that the aging dam was a threat to downstream residents. The lake was almost completely drained in 2010 and closed to fishing for three years due to reconstruction work designed to strengthen the dam and decrease erosion, as well as to add additional amenities including a new boardwalk and a new dock. After the lake was drained, at the urging of state senator Ronda Storms, the tons of tilapia and catfish removed from the reservoir were filleted and distributed to America's Second Harvest, which provided the fillets to local charities to feed the hungry. When the lake reopened in December 2012, it was designated a Fisheries Management Area (FMA) by the Florida Fish and Wildlife Conservation Commission (FWC), with special limits on the number and size of fish that could be taken, and with commercial fishing of tilapia, sailfin catfish, and armored catfish limited to Tuesday through Thursday. During the construction process, several artificial reefs were installed. During this time, the lake was stocked with 1.2 million fingerling sportsfish, including a quarter-million Florida-strain largemouth bass, plus an additional 6,600 large fish that were relocated from area lakes in 2012.

== Features ==
The park also features a 40 feet tall observation tower overlooking the lake from the Northeast, 42 campsites, and a disc golf course. The park contains several trails, including both hiking and equestrian trails. Horses may be rented at the adjacent Turkey Creek Stables. The park levies a $2.00 per vehicle entrance fee, a $5.00 boat launch fee, and a $25.00 canoe/kayak rental fee, with additional fees for camping.

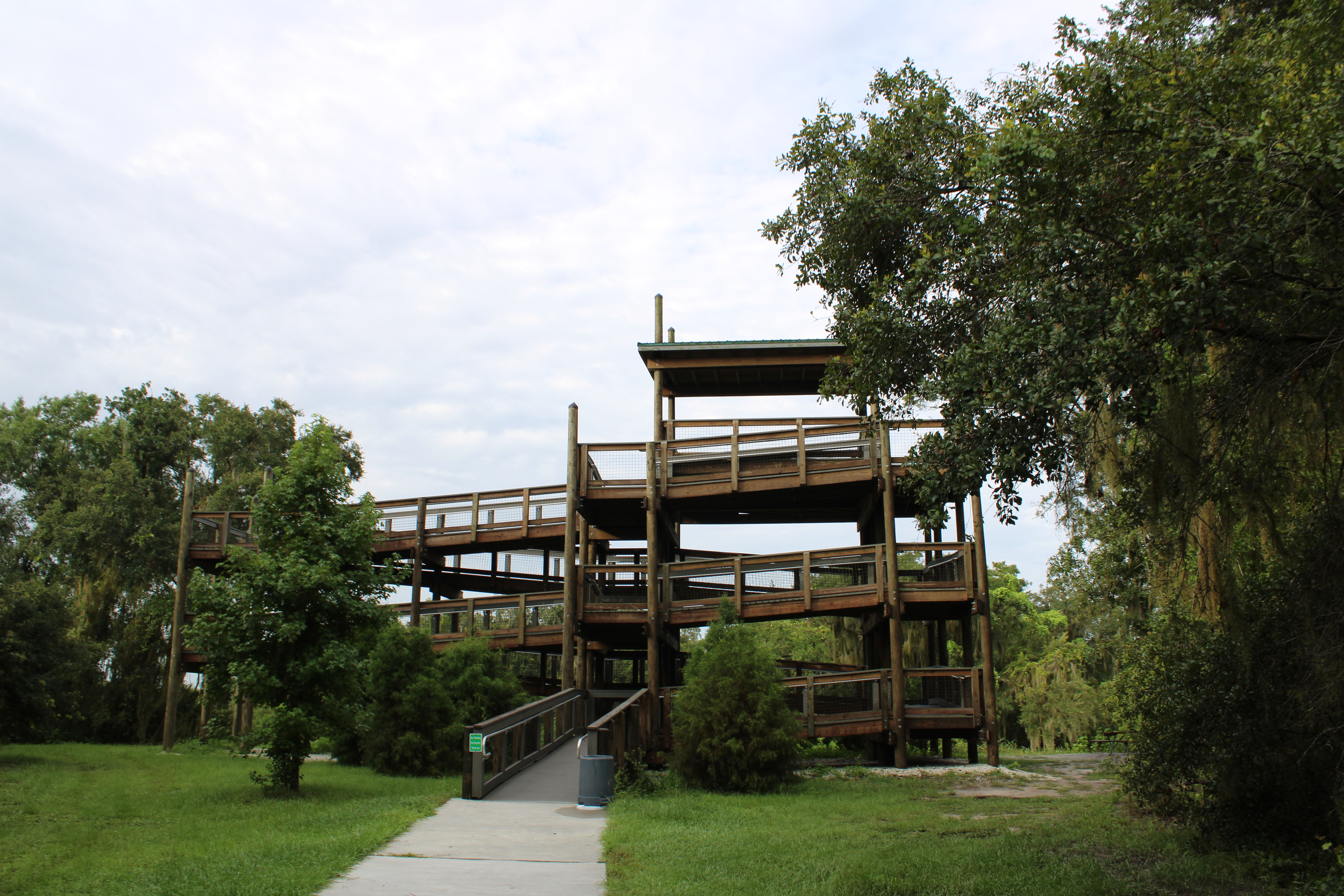
The observation tower in Edward Medard Park.

== Vegetation ==
Floating leaf aquatic plants include American Lotus, Water Lettuce, Marsh pennywort, Water spangles, Common Duckweed, Giant Duckweed, and Water Hyacinth. A wide variety of emergent zone plants thrive here, including Wild Taro, Egyptian paspalidium or watercrown grass, Setaria geminata, Laurel oak, Muscadine grape, Peruvian Primrose Willow, cattails and many more.

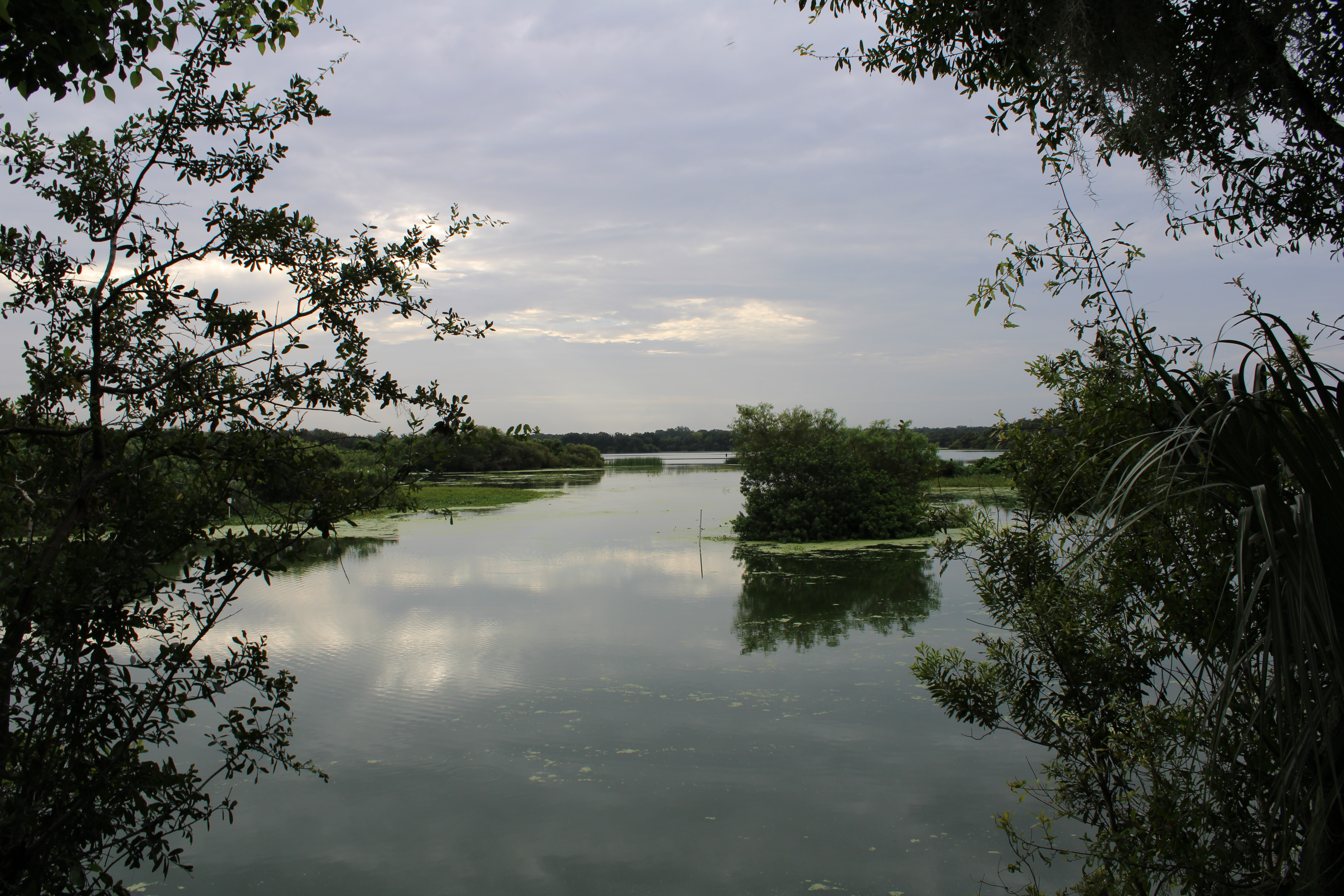
Looking out over the reservoir in July, 2024.
