= Wimauma, Florida =

- Census-designated place
- Location in Hillsborough County and the state of Florida
- Coordinates: 27°41′47″N 82°18′12″W
- Country: United States
- State: Florida
- County: Hillsborough
- Established: 1902
- Incorporated: 1925 (but no longer active)

Area
  - Total: 25.28 sq mi (65.47 km^{2})
  - Land: 25.03 sq mi (64.83 km^{2})
  - Water: 0.25 sq mi (0.64 km^{2})
- Elevation: 75 ft (23 m)

Population (2020)
  - Total: 9,467
  - Density: 378.2/sq mi (146.03/km^{2})
- Time zone: UTC-5 (Eastern (EST))
  - Summer (DST): UTC-4 (EDT)
- ZIP code: 33598
- Area code: 813
- FIPS code: 12-78025
- GNIS feature ID: 2403034

Wimauma is an unincorporated census-designated place in Hillsborough County, Florida, United States. As of the 2020 census, Wimauma had a population of 9,467.

== History ==
Wimauma was founded by Captain C.H. Davis in 1902. Davis named the town using the first few letters of the names of his daughters Will, Maude, and Mary. Wimauma was located on a 55-mile (89 km) railroad route that was built south from Durant to Manatee County and into Sarasota, with construction starting in 1895. It was incorporated in 1902 as the United States & West Indies Railroad and Steamship Company. It became the Florida West Shore Railway on May 9, 1903, and then merged into the Seaboard Air Line Railroad in 1909. In 1902, Capt. Davis helped to build the railroad connecting Turkey Creek and Bradenton. He decided to found a town at the halfway point, opening a post office there on October 24, 1902. The town had the railroad tracks as the eastern boundary and was centered on Lake Tiger, now called Lake Wimauma. A railroad depot was constructed in 1903. The town was officially incorporated in 1925 as the county's fourth municipality, but the city government ceased to function some time in the 1930s. In 1993, this fact was rediscovered, but it was concluded that the incorporation was no longer valid after about 60 years without a city government. The railroad depot in Wimauma served as a passenger stop until 1968. The railroad tracks were removed in 1984, and the station had been razed years before this removal.

The Church of God in Florida holds its annual camp meeting in their convention center on 674, across the road from Lake Wimauma, which is about a mile east of 301. The historic camp meeting has been held since the early 1900s. Until the 1980s, it was an open-air tabernacle, and it was not unusual for several thousand people to be in attendance during camp meeting. Today, it is an enclosed building, with more modest attendance (in the hundreds). While a number of cabins were destroyed to make room for parking and the such, there are still quite a few remaining. Some are occupied year-round by retired Church of God members. Others are used only during camp meeting, conferences, or the such.

== Geography ==
Wimauma is bordered to the north by Balm, to the west by Sun City Center, and to the south by Manatee County. U.S. Route 301 forms part of the western border of the community, leading north 19 miles (31 km) to the Brandon–Tampa area and southwest 24 miles (39 km) to Bradenton. Florida State Road 674 runs through the center of Wimauma, leading east 9 miles (14 km) to Fort Lonesome and west through Sun City Center 9 miles to Ruskin.

According to the United States Census Bureau, the Wimauma CDP has a total area of 25.3 square miles (65.5 km^{2}), of which 25.0 square miles (64.8 km^{2}) land and 0.2 square miles (0.6 km^{2}), or 0.99%, are water.

== Demographics ==
Historical population
Census	Pop.	Note	%±
1930	400		—
1940	557		39.3%
1950	440		−21.0%
1960	576		30.9%
1980	1,477		—
1990	2,932		98.5%
2000	4,246		44.8%
2010	6,373		50.1%
2020	9,467		48.5%

=== 2020 census ===
As of the 2020 census, Wimauma had a population of 9,467. The median age was 31.1 years. 29.8% of residents were under the age of 18 and 9.6% of residents were 65 years of age or older. For every 100 females there were 109.9 males, and for every 100 females age 18 and over there were 110.3 males age 18 and over.

84.6% of residents lived in urban areas, while 15.4% lived in rural areas.

There were 2,529 households in Wimauma, of which 49.4% had children under the age of 18 living in them. Of all households, 53.6% were married-couple households, 15.5% were households with a male householder and no spouse or partner present, and 23.4% were households with a female householder and no spouse or partner present. About 12.7% of all households were made up of individuals and 5.3% had someone living alone who was 65 years of age or older.

There were 2,817 housing units, of which 10.2% were vacant. The homeowner vacancy rate was 5.4% and the rental vacancy rate was 4.4%.

Racial composition as of the 2020 census
Race	Number	Percent
White	3,285	34.7%
Black or African American	1,141	12.1%
American Indian and Alaska Native	264	2.8%
Asian	122	1.3%
Native Hawaiian and Other Pacific Islander	13	0.1%
Some other race	2,447	25.8%
Two or more races	2,195	23.2%
Hispanic or Latino (of any race)	5,818	61.5%

=== 2000 census ===
As of the census of 2000, there were 4,246 people, 951 households, and 820 families residing in the community. The population density was 504.1 inhabitants per square mile (194.6/km^{2}). There were 1,097 housing units at an average density of 130.2 per square mile (50.3/km^{2}). The racial makeup of the community was 51.13% White, 7.42% African American, 0.80% Native American, 0.21% Asian, 0.28% Pacific Islander, 37.21% from other races, and 2.94% from two or more races. Hispanic or Latino of any race were 72.89% of the population.

There were 951 households, out of which 53.5% had children under the age of 18 living with them, 59.2% were married couples living together, 17.8% had a female householder with no husband present, and 13.7% were non-families. 8.8% of all households were made up of individuals, and 4.1% had someone living alone who was 65 years of age or older. The average household size was 4.31 and the average family size was 4.36.

In the community the population was spread out, with 38.6% under the age of 18, 14.2% from 18 to 24, 27.9% from 25 to 44, 13.6% from 45 to 64, and 5.7% who were 65 years of age or older. The median age was 24 years. For every 100 females, there were 116.3 males. For every 100 females age 18 and over, there were 124.5 males.

The median income for a household in the community was $35,114, and the median income for a family was $34,671. Males had a median income of $20,484 versus $19,604 for females. The per capita income for the community was $8,597. About 26.5% of families and 31.7% of the population were below the poverty line, including 44.5% of those under age 18 and 11.1% of those age 65 or over.

== Notable people ==
- Paul Kickliter, teacher, lawyer, judge, landowner and Florida state senator.
- Bill Warner, motorcycle racer
