= Palmetto, Florida =

- City
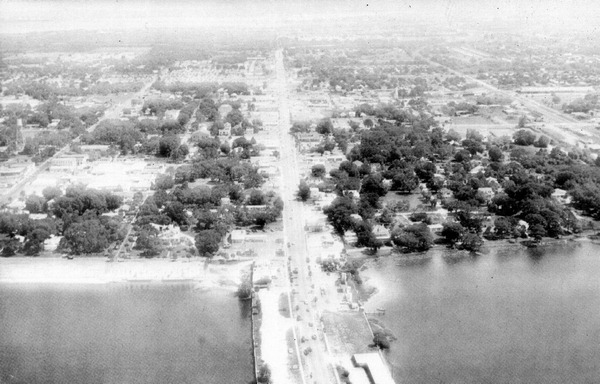
- Palmetto, Florida c. 1960

- Seal

- Location in Manatee County and the state of Florida
- Coordinates: 27°31′30″N 82°34′30″W
- Country: United States
- State: Florida
- County: Manatee
- Incorporated (city): 1897

Government
  - Type: Strong Mayor-Commission

Area
  - Total: 5.83 sq mi (15.11 km^{2})
  - Land: 5.35 sq mi (13.86 km^{2})
  - Water: 0.48 sq mi (1.25 km^{2})
- Elevation: 13 ft (4.0 m)

Population (2020)
  - Total: 13,323
  - Density: 2,490.1/sq mi (961.42/km^{2})
- Time zone: UTC-5 (Eastern (EST))
  - Summer (DST): UTC-4 (EDT)
- ZIP codes: 34220–34221
- Area code: 941
- FIPS code: 12-54250
- GNIS feature ID: 2404467
- Website: palmettofl.org

Palmetto is a city in Manatee County, Florida, United States. As of the 2020 census, the population was listed as 13,323, up from 12,606 at the 2010 census. It is part of the Sarasota metropolitan area.

== History ==
A post office called Palmetto has been in operation since 1868. Samuel Sparks Lamb is considered the "Father of Palmetto," having surveyed and plotted the city at its outset and donated several plots of land. He owned a general merchandise store in town. Samuel Sparks Lamb was from Clarke County, Mississippi, and arrived in the area near the Manatee River in 1868 establishing Palmetto. The city received its name from the palmetto trees near the original town site. Palmetto was first incorporated in May 1893 as a village, with its first mayor being P.S. Harlee. Palmetto was reincorporated as a city in 1897 and in the following years grew. In 1902 with the arrival of the railroad, the center of town moved from the waterfront to the Seaboard Air Line train station, served by the Sarasota Branch from Turkey Creek near Plant City through Palmetto to "Bradentown" and Sarasota. By 1921, the Atlantic Coast Line Railroad was operating a Tampa Southern Railroad Branch from Tampa to Palmetto and "Bradentown".

Compiled during the late 1930s and first published in 1939, the Federal Writers' Project's Florida guide listed Palmetto's population as 3,043 and described it as:

on the north bank of the Manatee River, has low frame-and-brick business buildings and numerous clapboard houses. The riverfront is alive with fishing and pleasure craft. Much of the town's income is derived from the packing and shipping of fruits and vegetables.

— Federal Writers' Project, "Part III: The Florida Loop", Florida: A Guide to the Southernmost State (1947)

A dolomite mine existed in Palmetto on the Manatee River from the 1950s to 1974. Several failed attempts were made to redevelop the property. In 1974, the property was almost sold for residential development, but the company backed out due to the economic recession that was occurring. In 1978, a proposal was made to create a residential community on the site. The site's master plan contained a nationwide motel chain with a restaurant, high-rise apartments along the Manatee River, single-family houses, and a shopping center built around a lake created from mining activities. The former 214-acre (87 ha) dolomite mine site was bought by WC Riveria Partners. It was then redeveloped in 1998 as Riveria Dunes, a residential community with a marina, townhouses, and homes.

== Geography ==
Palmetto is in central Manatee County, on the north side of the tidal Manatee River, across from the city of Bradenton, the county seat. According to the United States Census Bureau, the city has a total area of 5.8 square miles (15 km^{2}), of which 5.3 square miles (14 km^{2}) are land and 0.5 square miles (1.3 km^{2}) 8.26%, are water.

== Demographics ==
Historical population
Census	Pop.	Note	%±
1890	224		—
1900	569		154.0%
1910	773		35.9%
1920	2,046		164.7%
1930	3,043		48.7%
1940	3,491		14.7%
1950	4,103		17.5%
1960	5,556		35.4%
1970	7,422		33.6%
1980	8,637		16.4%
1990	9,268		7.3%
2000	12,571		35.6%
2010	12,606		0.3%
2020	13,323		5.7%
U.S. Decennial Census

=== Racial and ethnic composition ===
Palmetto racial composition (Hispanics excluded from racial categories) (NH = Non-Hispanic)
Race	Pop 2010	Pop 2020	% 2010	% 2020
White (NH)	7,456	7,680	59.15%	57.64%
Black or African American (NH)	1,293	1,323	10.26%	9.93%
Native American or Alaska Native (NH)	29	27	0.23%	0.20%
Asian (NH)	71	94	0.56%	0.71%
Pacific Islander or Native Hawaiian (NH)	1	5	0.01%	0.04%
Some other race (NH)	21	66	0.17%	0.50%
Two or more races/Multiracial (NH)	164	373	1.30%	2.80%
Hispanic or Latino (any race)	3,571	3,755	28.33%	28.18%
Total	12,606	13,323		

=== 2020 census ===
As of the 2020 census, Palmetto had a population of 13,323. The median age was 49.9 years. 19.0% of residents were under the age of 18 and 28.6% of residents were 65 years of age or older. For every 100 females there were 92.8 males, and for every 100 females age 18 and over there were 91.2 males age 18 and over.

99.8% of residents lived in urban areas, while 0.2% lived in rural areas.

There were 5,480 households in Palmetto, of which 24.4% had children under the age of 18 living in them. Of all households, 44.1% were married-couple households, 19.0% were households with a male householder and no spouse or partner present, and 29.2% were households with a female householder and no spouse or partner present. About 29.0% of all households were made up of individuals and 18.5% had someone living alone who was 65 years of age or older.

There were 7,036 housing units, of which 22.1% were vacant. The homeowner vacancy rate was 2.7% and the rental vacancy rate was 8.1%.

=== 2020 estimates ===
In the 2020 ACS 5-year estimates, there were 3,043 families residing in the city.

=== 2010 census ===
As of the 2010 United States census, there were 12,606 people, 5,537 households, and 3,085 families residing in the city.

In 2010, 23.4% had children under the age of 18 living with them, 47.4% were married couples living together, 5.3% had a male householder with no wife present, and 12.6% had a female householder with no husband present. Within all households, 28.1% were made up of householders living alone and 14.8% had the individual living alone and was 65 years of age or older. The average household size was 2.53 and the average family size was 3.07.

In 2010, the age distribution among the population includes 24.8% being 19 years old and under, 5.6% from 20 to 24, 21.6% from 25 to 44, 26.0% from 45 to 64, and 22.0% who were 65 years of age or older. The median age was 43.1 years. For every 100 females, there were 100.012 males. For every 100 males age 18 and over, there were 98.86 females.

== Government ==
The mayor of Palmetto is the city's head executive and is elected every four years. The city commission serves as the city's legislative body and has five members. Three of the commissioners are elected from their respective wards while the other two are elected at-large citywide. The city commission has the power to elect a vice-mayor who serves for a one-year term.

Palmetto has an official seal which is defined under the municipal code of ordinances. An earlier seal of Palmetto containing a Palm tree and text (also in green): "CITY OF PALMETTO" was replaced in 1997.

== Education ==
School District of Manatee County is the respective school district.

Palmetto is home to Blackburn, Palmetto, James Tillman, Virgil Mills and Palmview Elementary Schools, Lincoln and Buffalo Creek Middle Schools and Palmetto High School. Charter schools include Manatee School for the Arts (grades 6–12), Imagine School of North Manatee (grades K–8), and Palmetto Charter School (grades K–8).

== Media ==
The metro area has TV broadcasting stations that serve the Tampa-Saint Petersburg-Sarasota (DMA) as defined by Nielsen Media Research.

== Transportation ==
US Route 41 and US Route 301 converge in Palmetto. I-275 begins at exit 228 of I-75 with two lanes in each direction in rural Palmetto.

The Atlantic Coast Line's West Coast Champion passenger train into Palmetto, from New York bound for Sarasota, ceased making stops in Palmetto after the Atlantic Coast Line and Seaboard Coast Line merged in 1967 into the Seaboard Coast Line and Palmetto was dropped as a stop.

== Notable people ==
- George Dickie, philosopher
- Eric Engberg, former CBS News correspondent
- Winfield R. Gaylord, Wisconsin state senator, socialist politician, minister
- Ralph Haben, former Speaker of the Florida House of Representatives
- Tom Hume, former pitcher and coach for Cincinnati Reds
- Curtis Johnson, sprinter in the 2000 Summer Olympics
- Nick Neri, race car driver
- Mistral Raymond, former NFL defensive back for the Minnesota Vikings
- Willie Taggart, head coach for several teams

== Points of interest ==
- Palmetto Estuary Preserve
- Palmetto Historic District
- Palmetto Historical Park
