= Florida Railroad Museum =

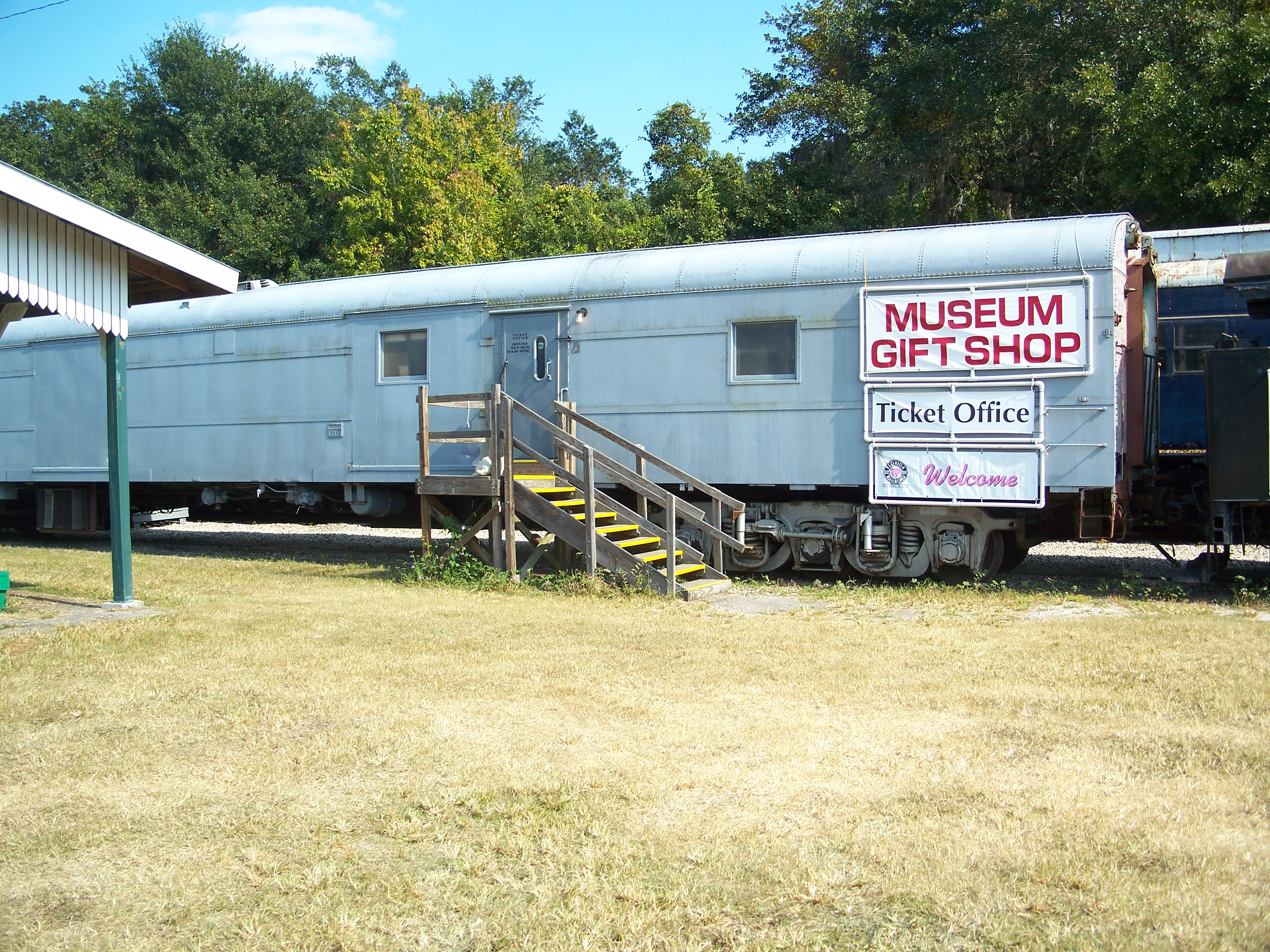
- Established: 1981
- Coordinates: 27°35′24″N 82°25′25″W
- Type: Railroad museum
- President: George Wilson
- Website: frrm.org

The Florida Railroad Museum (reporting mark FGCX) is a railroad museum located in Parrish, Florida. The museum operates a heritage railroad and offers round-trip tourist excursions along six miles of the former Seaboard Air Line Sarasota Subdivision in Manatee County between Parrish and Willow.

== History ==
The museum was founded in 1981 as the Florida Gulf Coast Railroad Museum, and has been operating weekend excursions out of Parrish since 1992. The museum is also active in the ghost town of Willow, where it has maintenance facilities. At Willow, there is a railroad spur that leads east off of the mainline to a Florida Power & Light Company plant. CSX Transportation provides rail service to the plant. The area of Willow is accessible from Willow Road east off of US 301. The museum has a fence around its facilities at Willow and cameras for security. It has constructed a new depot at Willow within this secured property.

The railroad line that the Florida Railroad Museum uses is a very small part of a 55-mile route that was built south from Durant to Manatee County and into Sarasota with construction starting in 1895. It was first incorporated in 1902 as the United States & West Indies Railroad and Steamship Company. It became the Florida West Shore Railway on May 9, 1903. On November 4, 1909, it was acquired by the Seaboard Air Line Railroad Company. In 1967, the merger of the Seaboard Air Line and the Atlantic Coast Line created the Seaboard Coast Line. The Seaboard Coast Line would later become a part of the Family Lines System. This would lead to the Seaboard System and that would become a part of CSX Transportation in the 1980s, although the segment from Durant to Willow was pulled up in 1986. The line is currently part of the CSX Palmetto Subdivision's Parrish Spur. It is Class I track with jointed, 75-pound rails.

The Florida Railroad Museum is one of three Official State Railroad Museums in Florida. It became a Florida state railroad museum in 1984 when it received statutory recognition by the Florida Legislature as meeting the following four criteria: its purpose is to preserve railroad history, it is devoted primarily to the history of railroading, it is open to the public, and it operates as a non-profit organization. It is open Saturdays and Sundays from 10 a.m. to 4 p.m. year-round. The train departs from Parrish at 11 a.m. and 2 p.m. on these days, and the excursions from Parrish to Willow last about an hour and a half round trip. The museum also offers specials events throughout the year such as Day Out With Thomas, Pumpkin Patch Express, and North Pole Express.

== Rolling stock ==
=== Locomotives ===
| Builder | Model | Year built | Type | Current number | Former numbers (if applicable) | Operational status |
|---|---|---|---|---|---|---|
| EMD | CF7 | 1950 | Diesel-electric | IMCX 204 | ATSF 238L (F7), ATSF 2472 (CF7) | In service; primary road power. |
| EMD | FP7 | 1952 | Diesel-electric | VLIX 904 | GO Transit 904 | Stored, no prime mover. |
| EMD | GP7 | 1951 | Diesel-electric | FGCX 1835 | USATC 1835 | In service; primary road power. |
| EMD | GP7 | 1951 | Diesel-electric | FGCX 1822 | USATC 1822 | Stored, used for parts for GP7 1835 due to being in less good condition upon arrival with 1835. |
| EMD | GP10 | 1954 | Diesel-electric | FGCX 8330 | UP 183B, ICG 8330, IC 8330, G&O 8330 | Out of service; primary road power. Original Paducah prime mover suffered failure in Dec 2018. Returned to service in Dec 2024 following installation and testing of a replacement 567 prime mover. Out of service again due to #4 traction motor failure. |
| ALCO | RS3 | 1951 | Diesel-electric | Seaboard Air Line 1633 | NYC 8277, PC 5518, AMTK 133 | Out of service; on display in Willow yard. |
| ALCO | RS3 | 1955 | Diesel-electric | PRR 8604 | PRR 8604, PC 5404, AMTK 114 | Stored, used for parts initially for RS3 1633 |
| ALCO | S-2M | 1946 | Diesel-electric | CYDZ 251 | | In service; primary road power and/or switch power. |
| GE | 44-ton switcher | | Diesel-electric | FGCX 100 | US Navy 65-00345 | Out of service awaiting possible repair to #1 prime mover. |
| EMD | NW5 | | Diesel-electric | | Cargill 61 | Static display in Parrish, used as occasional part source for the operational EMD locomotives on the roster. |
| Porter | 0-6-0T | | Steam | BEDT 12 | | Static display in Parrish. |
| BLW | 0-6-0 | | Steam | Frisco 3749 | | Static display. Once appeared in an MGM movie, The Wings of Eagles, starring John Wayne. |
| BLW | 2-6-2 | | Steam | Cummer Sons Cypress 104 | | Static display in Willow. Formerly on static display in Leesburg, FL |

=== Cars ===
| Builder | Model | Year built | Type | Current number | Former numbers (if applicable) | Operational status |
|---|---|---|---|---|---|---|
| Fruit Growers Express | | | Refrigerated box car | ex-TPIX 250 | TPIX 250 | Static display |
| | | | Tank car | ex-SAL? | SAL? | Static display |
| ACF | U-12 | 1962 | Covered hopper | TBA | Atlantic Coast Line 10304; CSXT 651873 | Static display |
| Pullman | Pullman | 1926 | Passenger | Kentucky Club | Mt. Langford; Kentucky; Royal American Shows 51 | Traded w/ Kentucky Railroad Museum for Seaboard Air Line coach #821. |
| Pullman | Pullman | | Sleeper | TBA | Formerly owned by RBBX circus. To be used as crew quarters for crews who stay overnight. | In service in Willow Yard. |
| Pullman | Pullman | 1954 | Passenger | Cape Tormentine | Originally operated by Canadian National Railway and later Via Rail Canada. | Traded along with the Kentucky Club to the Kentucky Railroad Museum for Seaboard Air Line coach #821. |
| | EMU | 1930 | Passenger | FGCX 3518 | Delaware, Lackawanna and Western Railroad 3518; New Jersey Transit 3518 | Out of service |
| | EMU | 1930 | Passenger | FGCX 3572 | Delaware, Lackawanna and Western Railroad 3572; New Jersey Transit 3572 | Out of service |
| | Baggage-RPO | 1925 | Passenger | Southern Railway 142 | | Stored |
| | Coach | 1914 | Passenger | Illinois Central Railroad 2682 | Royal American Shows 2682 | Stored, partially restored |
| | Coach | 1950 | Passenger | FGCX 2002 | Union Pacific 5416, Alaska RR 5416, New Georgia 2002 | In service |
| | Caboose | 1929 | Freight | Texas and Pacific Railway 12070 | | In Service |
| N&W | Caboose | 1942 | Freight | Norfolk and Western Railway 518415 | | In Service for special events. |
| B&O | Caboose | 1945 | Freight | Baltimore and Ohio Railroad C-2417 | | Originally on static display in Willow. Now sold to a church group. |
| Pullman | Pine-series | 1953 | Passenger | Short Leaf Pine | Louisville and Nashville Railroad #3464 | Under restoration |
| Bethlehem Steel | Coach | 1938 | Passenger | Atlantic Coast Line Railroad 1116 | | In storage |

== Gallery ==
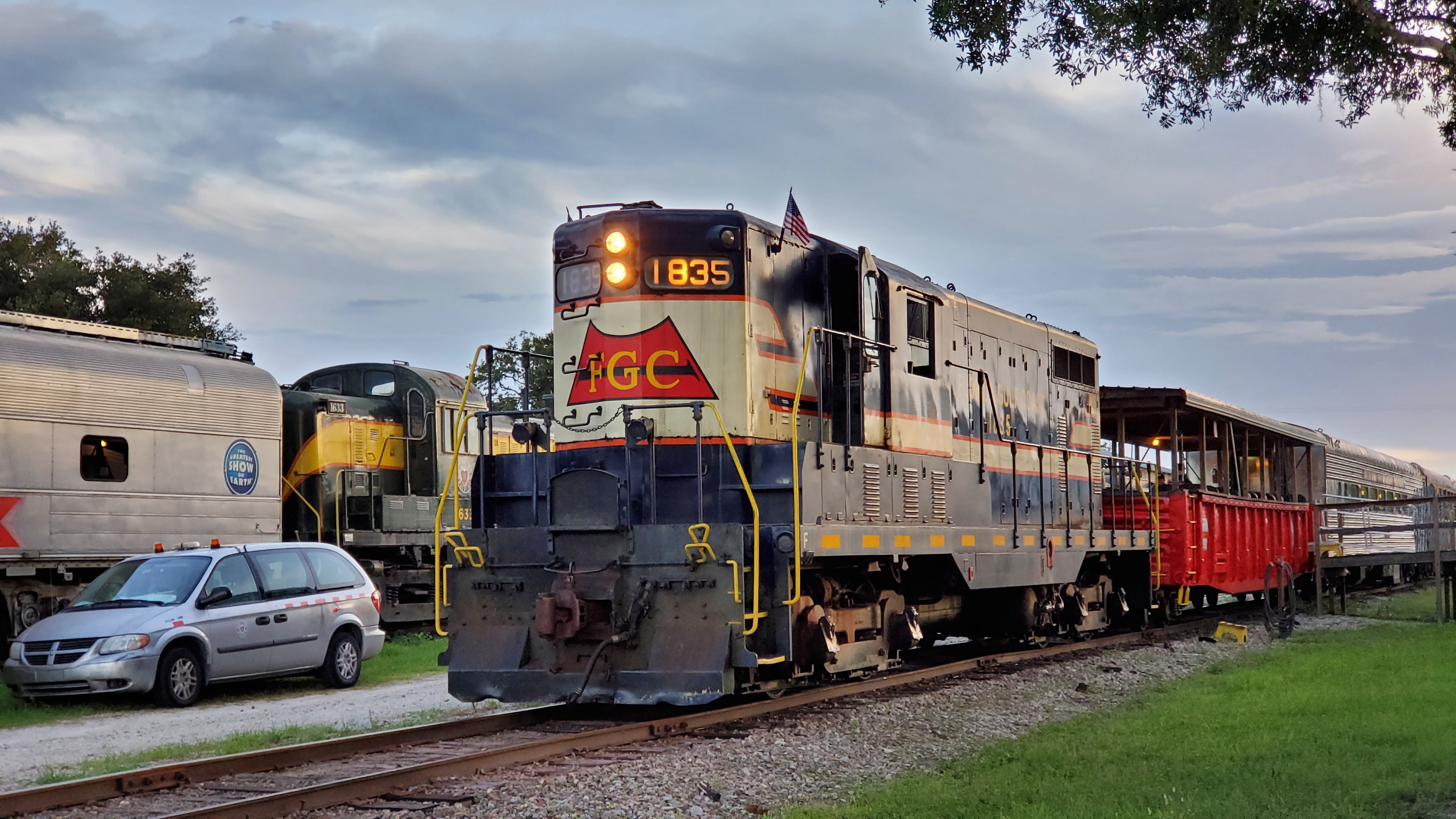
EMD GP7 #1835

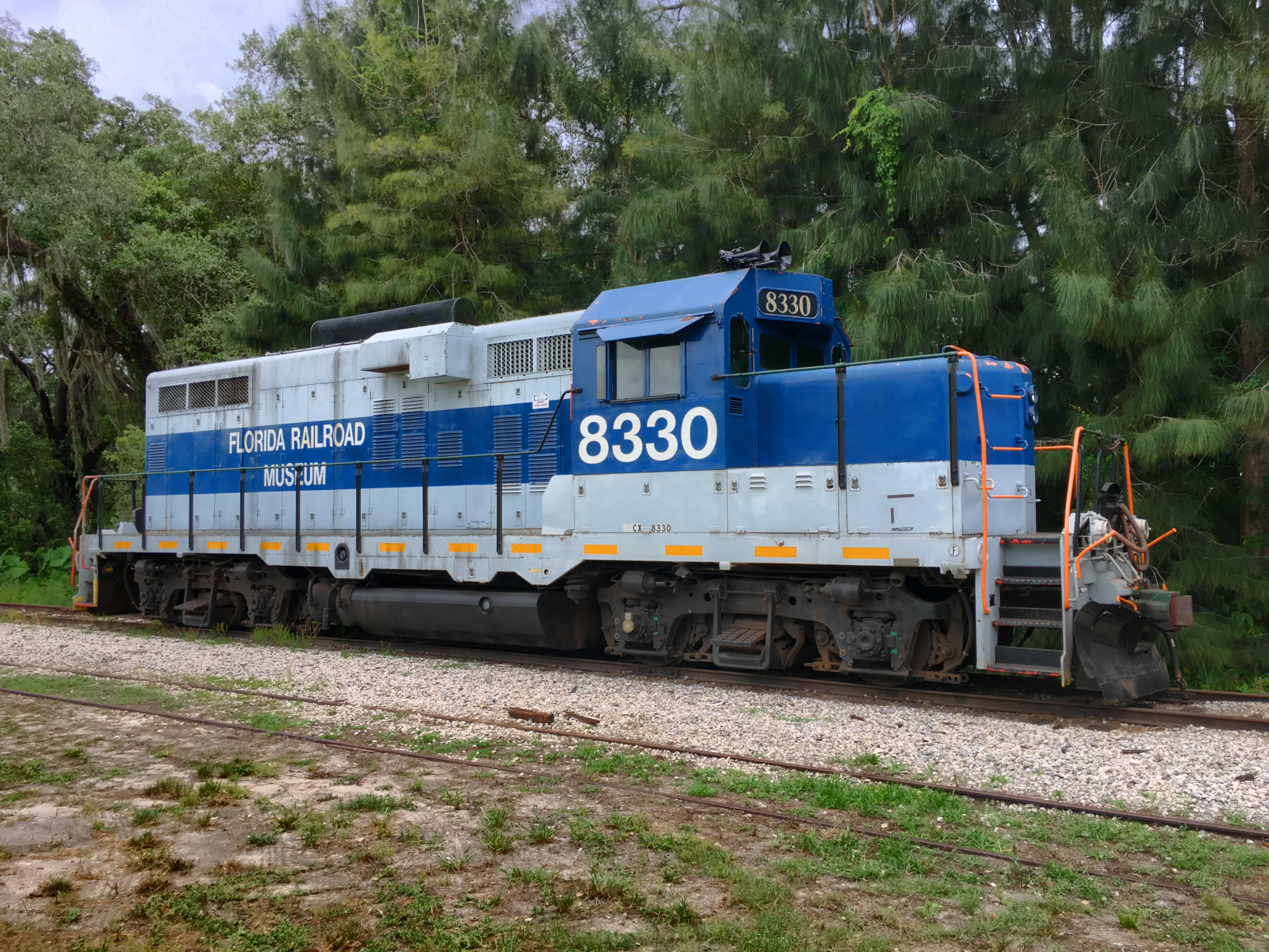
EMD GP10 #8330

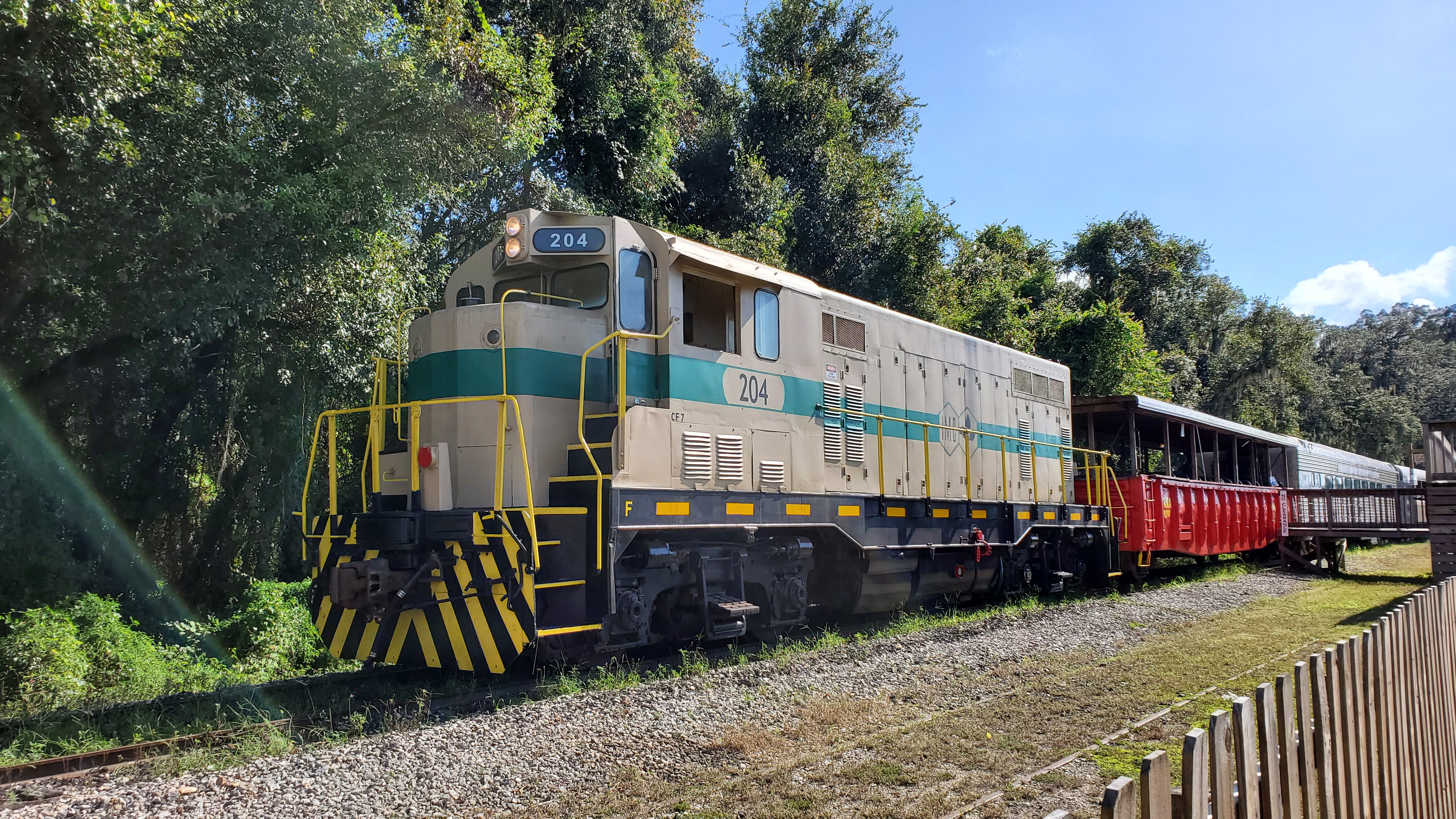
EMD CF7 #204

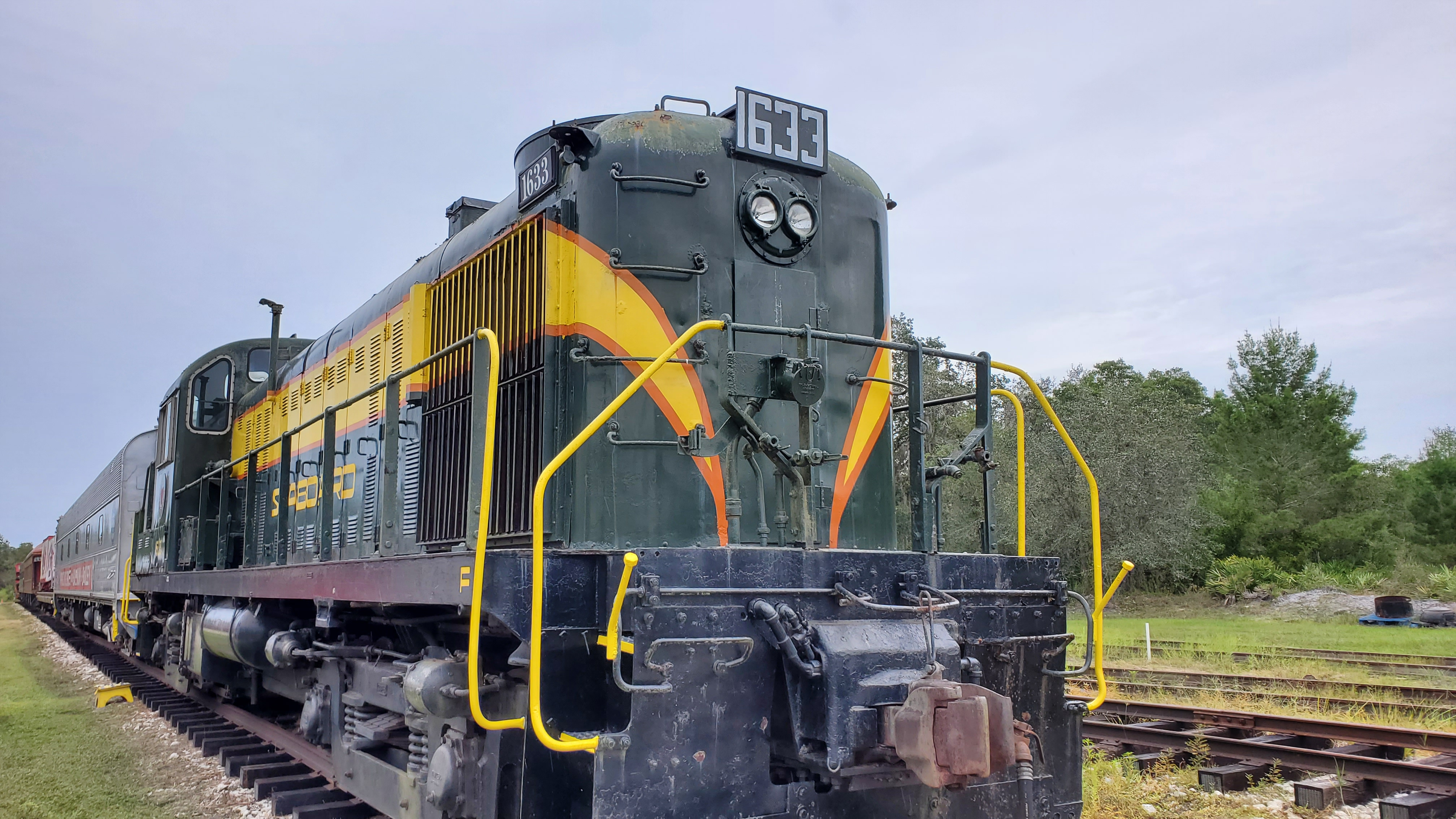
ALCO RS3 #1633

== See also ==
- Gold Coast Railroad Museum
- Royal Palm Railway Experience
