= Lake Wimauma =

Lake in the state of Florida, United States

- Location within Florida Location within the United States
- Location: Wimauma, Florida
- Coordinates: 27°42′31″N 82°18′44″W
- Type: natural freshwater lake
- Basin countries: United States
- Max. length: 3,215 ft (980 m)
- Max. width: 2,145 ft (654 m)
- Surface area: 108 acres (44 ha)
- Average depth: 8 ft (2.4 m)
- Max. depth: 17 ft (5.2 m)
- Water volume: 157.169000 U.S. gal (594.94938 L)
- Surface elevation: 85 ft (26 m)

Lake Wimauma, on the south side of the town of Wimauma, Florida, could be considered two lakes, basically round in shape. When the water level is high, they are connected by a short narrow channel. The south part of the lake is much larger than the northern part. Lake Wimauma has a 108-acre (440,000 m^{2}) surface area. To the north of the northern part is Florida State Route 674. The entire lake is surrounded by trees, grassland and a scattering of residences. Although the lake is in a rural area, Hillsborough County, Florida, is the home of Tampa, Florida.

There are no public boat ramps or swimming beaches on the lake's shores, but along SR 674, on the north part of the lake, is an area where cars may pull off the road and where the lake can be accessed by the public. The Hook and Bullet website says the lake contains largemouth bass, bluegill and crappie.
