= Sarasota station =

- Atlantic Coast Line Passenger Depot
- Formerly listed on the U.S. National Register of Historic Places
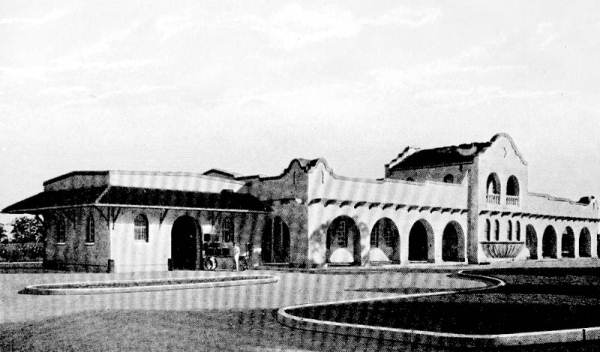

- Location within Florida
- Location: Sarasota, Florida
- Coordinates: 27°20′11″N 82°31′34″W
- Built: 1925
- Architect: Alpheus M. Griffin
- Architectural style: Mission/Spanish Revival
- Demolished: January 1986
- MPS: Sarasota MRA
- NRHP reference No.: 84000957

Significant dates
- Added to NRHP: March 22, 1984
- Removed from NRHP: July 25, 2018

The Atlantic Coast Line Passenger Depot was a historic Atlantic Coast Line Railroad depot in Sarasota, Florida, United States. It was located at 1 South School Avenue.

== History ==
The Tampa Southern Railroad began service through Sarasota in May 1924. The first passenger train arrived in December 1924 at the freight and temporary passenger station north of Fruitville Road. A permanent Atlantic Coast Line passenger depot, Sarasota Station, was constructed in 1925. The architect was Alpheus M. Griffin.

In 1967, Atlantic Coast Line (ACL) and Seaboard Air Line Railway (SAL) merged as the Seaboard Coast Line Railroad (SCL). The West Coast Champion made its last run to Sarasota and Venice from Boston and New York on May 1, 1971.

On March 22, 1984, the depot was added to the U.S. National Register of Historic Places. Two years later, it was demolished. It was delisted from the National Register on July 25, 2018.

== Gallery ==
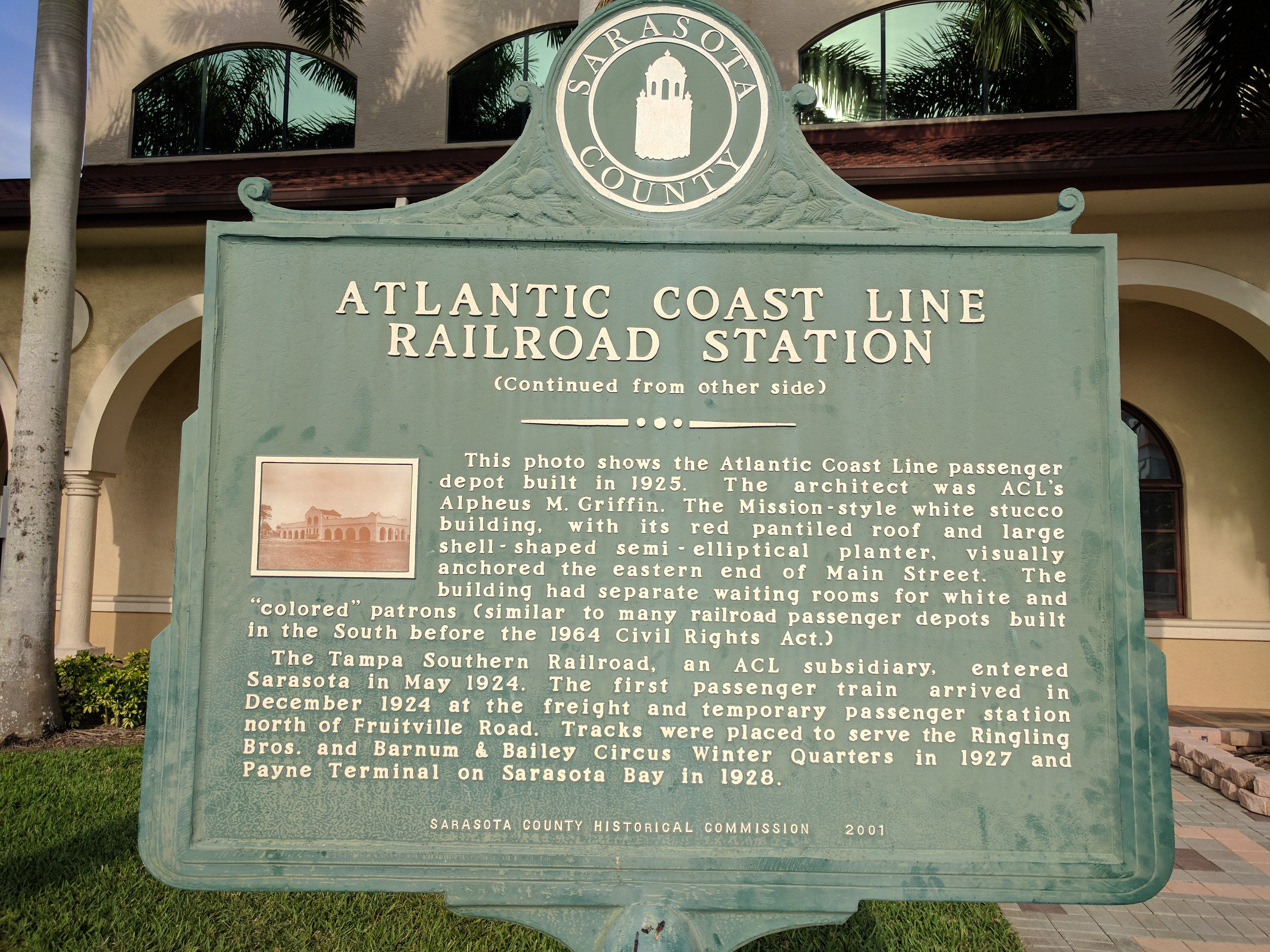
Historical marker located at the former railroad depot

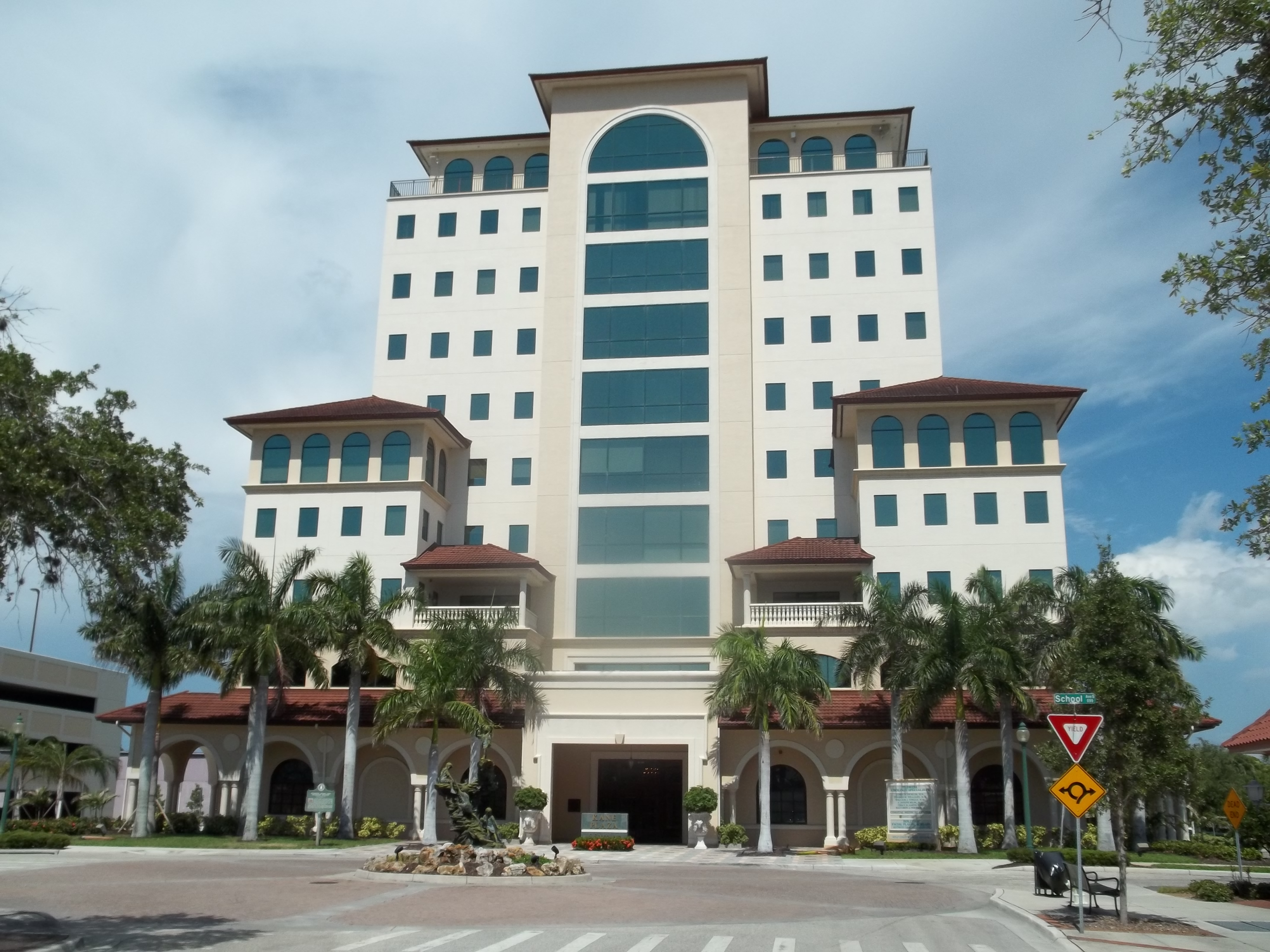
Original site of depot, now demolished

Preceding station	Atlantic Coast Line Railroad	Following station
Matoaka toward Tampa	Tampa Southern Railroad	East Sarasota toward Southfort
