= Balm, Florida =

Unincorporated community in Florida, US

- Census-designated place
- Location of Balm in Hillsborough County, Florida.
- Coordinates: 27°45′34″N 82°15′40″W
- Country: United States
- State: Florida
- County: Hillsborough

Area
  - Total: 10.16 sq mi (26.31 km^{2})
  - Land: 10.05 sq mi (26.04 km^{2})
  - Water: 0.10 sq mi (0.27 km^{2})
- Elevation: 98 ft (30 m)

Population (2020)
  - Total: 6,541
  - Density: 650.5/sq mi (251.17/km^{2})
- Time zone: UTC-5 (Eastern (EST))
  - Summer (DST): UTC-4 (EDT)
- ZIP code: 33503
- Area codes: 813, 656
- FIPS code: 12-03375
- GNIS feature ID: 2583326

Balm is an unincorporated census-designated place in Hillsborough County, Florida, United States. As of the 2020 census, Balm had a population of 6,541.

== History ==
A post office was established here in 1902 and called "Doric"; it was renamed the next month to "Balm". The community was so named on account of their "balmy" air. Prior to 1902, the Seaboard Air Line Railway established Balm as a flag stop. The railroad built a one-room station and water tank. This made Balm a focal point, and a small community including a blacksmith, sawmills, a teacher, and a general store sprang up by 1911. In 1937, electricity arrived, soon followed by a community telephone, set up in a barn for all to use. By 1945 the area had a population of over a thousand.

== Geography ==
Balm is located in southern Hillsborough County, bordered by Riverview to the north, Apollo Beach to the west, Sun City Center to the southwest, and Wimauma to the south. U.S. Route 301 forms the western border of the Balm CDP, and leads north 12 miles (19 km) to the eastern outskirts of Tampa and southwest 28 miles (45 km) to Bradenton.

According to the U.S. Census Bureau, the Balm CDP has a total area of 10.2 square miles (26.3 km^{2}), of which 10.0 square miles (26.0 km^{2}) are land and 0.1 square miles (0.3 km^{2}), or 1.03%, are water.

== Demographics ==
Historical population
| Census | Pop. | Note | %± |
|---|---|---|---|
| 2010 | 1,457 | | — |
| 2020 | 6,541 | | 348.9% |
U.S. Decennial Census

Balm first appeared as a census designated place in the 2010 U.S. census.

=== Racial and ethnic composition ===
Balm CDP, Florida – Racial and ethnic composition Note: the US Census treats Hispanic/Latino as an ethnic category. This table excludes Latinos from the racial categories and assigns them to a separate category. Hispanics/Latinos may be of any race.
| Race / Ethnicity (NH = Non-Hispanic) | Pop 2010 | Pop 2020 | % 2010 | % 2020 |
|---|---|---|---|---|
| White alone (NH) | 753 | 2,025 | 51.68% | 30.96% |
| Black or African American alone (NH) | 209 | 1,881 | 14.34% | 28.76% |
| Native American or Alaska Native alone (NH) | 2 | 5 | 0.14% | 0.08% |
| Asian alone (NH) | 23 | 172 | 1.58% | 2.63% |
| Native Hawaiian or Pacific Islander alone (NH) | 0 | 2 | 0.00% | 0.03% |
| Other race alone (NH) | 4 | 52 | 0.27% | 0.79% |
| Mixed race or Multiracial (NH) | 14 | 282 | 0.96% | 4.31% |
| Hispanic or Latino (any race) | 452 | 2,122 | 31.02% | 32.44% |
| Total | 1,457 | 6,541 | 100.00% | 100.00% |

=== 2020 census ===
As of the 2020 census, Balm had a population of 6,541. The median age was 33.6 years. 30.0% of residents were under the age of 18 and 10.7% were 65 years of age or older. For every 100 females there were 95.3 males, and for every 100 females age 18 and over there were 90.6 males age 18 and over.

86.4% of residents lived in urban areas, while 13.6% lived in rural areas.

There were 2,026 households in Balm, of which 44.2% had children under the age of 18 living in them. Of all households, 61.5% were married-couple households, 11.0% were households with a male householder and no spouse or partner present, and 19.1% were households with a female householder and no spouse or partner present. About 13.0% of all households were made up of individuals and 4.3% had someone living alone who was 65 years of age or older.

There were 2,164 housing units, of which 6.4% were vacant. The homeowner vacancy rate was 2.2% and the rental vacancy rate was 11.3%.

Racial composition as of the 2020 census
| Race | Number | Percent |
|---|---|---|
| White | 2,434 | 37.2% |
| Black or African American | 1,976 | 30.2% |
| American Indian and Alaska Native | 46 | 0.7% |
| Asian | 176 | 2.7% |
| Native Hawaiian and Other Pacific Islander | 5 | 0.1% |
| Some other race | 890 | 13.6% |
| Two or more races | 1,014 | 15.5% |

=== Demographic estimates ===
According to the Census Bureau's QuickFacts for Balm, the population density was 650.5 inhabitants per square mile (251.2/km^{2}), and there were 3.17 persons per household. By age, 8.4% of residents were under 5 years old, and 54.4% of residents were female.

The owner-occupied housing unit rate was 89.8%. The median value of owner-occupied housing units was $237,800. The median selected monthly owner costs were $1,723 with a mortgage and $547 without a mortgage. The median gross rent was $1,824. 99.4% of households had a computer, and 97.3% had a broadband internet subscription. The median household income was $96,406, the per capita income was $29,638, and 7.2% of the population lived below the poverty threshold.

91.4% of residents age 25 and older were high school graduates or higher, and 26.9% of that population had a bachelor's degree or higher.

== Economy ==
Originally a rail stop and logging town, the economy is mostly agricultural, particularly citrus. The University of Florida's Tomato Breeding Program is located in Balm. In 2005, the Bradenton REC was merged with the Dover REC to become the Gulf Coast Research and Experiment Center, which was relocated to Balm. Other activities at the GCREC include hops research. Tropical fish farming has also been a significant industry in the area.
