= Platt, Florida =

Unincorporated community in Florida, U.S.

Platt is an unincorporated community in DeSoto County, Florida, United States. It is located approximately 3 miles (4.8 km) west of Fort Ogden.

== Geography ==
Platt is located at 27°05′31″N 82°00′06″W at an elevation of 16 feet (4.9 m).
