= Regional planning council (Florida) =

Quasi-governmental organizations designated by Florida law

Regional planning councils (RPCs) are quasi-governmental organizations in Florida established under Florida Statutes, Chapter 186, to address problems and plan solutions that are of greater-than-local concern or scope, and to provide input into state policy development. RPCs assist local governments in addressing issues that cross jurisdictional boundaries, including growth management, economic development, environmental planning, transportation, emergency preparedness, housing, and disaster resiliency.

RPCs do not have regulatory or permitting authority. Their statutory role is advisory and coordinative in nature and includes technical assistance, planning support, economic development coordination, and facilitation of intergovernmental cooperation among federal, state, regional, and local entities.

== Background ==
The Florida Regional Planning Council Act was passed by the Florida Legislature in 1980 to create a framework for regional cooperation among local governments. The Legislature recognized that:

“The problems of growth and development often transcend the boundaries of individual units of local general-purpose government” and that “there is a need for regional planning agencies to assist local governments to resolve their common problems, engage in areawide comprehensive and functional planning, administer certain federal and state grants-in-aid, and provide a regional focus in regard to multiple programs undertaken on an areawide basis.”

Under this act, the state established Regional Planning Councils (RPCs), each serving as an association of the district’s constituent local governments.

== Planning Activities and Programs ==
The principal product of each RPC is the Strategic Regional Policy Plan (SRPP), which identifies key regional resources and facilities, examines current and forecast conditions and trends, and establishes regional goals and policies to address identified problems and needs. Strategic subject areas may include affordable housing, economic development, emergency preparedness, natural resources, and regional transportation.

In addition to SRPPs, RPCs engage in a wide range of programs and activities to support regional planning and intergovernmental coordination. These include:

- Economic Development – assisting local governments in promoting business growth, workforce development, and regional investment.
- Transportation Planning – coordinating regional transportation systems, land development policies, and partnering with Metropolitan Planning Organizations to improve mobility.
- Housing and Environmental Planning – providing technical assistance and planning support for housing initiatives and environmental protection.
- Emergency Preparedness and Disaster Resilience – developing and implementing regional emergency response plans in coordination with the Florida Division of Emergency Management.
- Data, GIS, and Technology Services – offering statistical analysis, geographic information systems support, and other technical resources for local and regional projects.
- Public Health and Community Programs – supporting initiatives that address public health, small business development, and other community needs.

This integrated approach ensures that RPCs not only produce long-term regional plans but also actively support the implementation of programs that address cross-jurisdictional challenges.

== Florida Regional Planning Councils ==
=== Governance and membership ===
Each county in a regional planning council's district has representation on the RPC Board of Directors and is entitled to at least one vote. Board members are a combination of locally elected officials and gubernatorial appointees. At least two-thirds of voting members must be locally elected officials, which typically include city and county commissioners. The Governor of Florida may appoint additional members, including an elected school board member nominated by the Florida School Boards Association, as well as ex-officio nonvoting members who provide technical expertise and subject-matter support to the council's initiatives.

=== Regional Planning Councils in Florida ===
Florida has ten regional planning councils, each corresponding to one of the state's comprehensive planning districts. These councils provide planning, coordination, and technical assistance for growth management, economic development, and intergovernmental cooperation.

Regional Planning Council	Headquarters / City	Counties Covered
Apalachee Regional Planning Council	Tallahassee	Calhoun, Franklin, Gadsden, Gulf, Jackson, Jefferson, Leon, Liberty, Wakulla
Central Florida Regional Planning Council	Bartow	DeSoto, Hardee, Highlands, Okeechobee, Polk
East Central Florida Regional Planning Council	Orlando	Brevard, Lake, Marion, Orange, Osceola, Seminole, Sumter, Volusia
Emerald Coast Regional Council	Pensacola	Bay, Escambia, Holmes, Okaloosa, Santa Rosa, Walton, Washington
North Central Florida Regional Planning Council	Gainesville	Alachua, Bradford, Columbia, Dixie, Gilchrist, Hamilton, Lafayette, Levy, Madison, Suwannee, Taylor, Union
Northeast Florida Regional Council	Jacksonville	Baker, Clay, Duval, Flagler, Nassau, Putnam, St. Johns
South Florida Regional Planning Council	Hollywood	Broward, Miami-Dade, Monroe
Southwest Florida Regional Planning Council	Fort Myers	Charlotte, Collier, Glades, Hendry, Lee, Sarasota
Tampa Bay Regional Planning Council	Tampa	Citrus, Hernando, Hillsborough, Manatee, Pasco, Pinellas
Treasure Coast Regional Planning Council	Stuart	Indian River, Martin, Palm Beach, St. Lucie

Note: Membership and geographic boundaries are defined in F.S. § 186.512. Any changes require legislative action. County coverage listed is per the Florida Regional Councils Association (FRCA) as of 2026.

=== Florida Regional Councils Association (FRCA) ===
The Florida Regional Councils Association (FRCA) is a nonprofit membership organization composed of all 10 RPCs. FRCA provides advocacy, professional development, information sharing, and coordination among Florida’s regional planning councils. While FRCA supports the RPCs and facilitates communication with state and federal agencies, it does not have statutory authority over individual councils.

=== Economic Development Districts ===
Many Florida RPCs are also designated by the U.S. Economic Development Administration (EDA) as Economic Development Districts (EDDs). This designation allows RPCs to receive federal support for regional economic development planning, prepare Comprehensive Economic Development Strategies (CEDS), and coordinate initiatives that support business growth, workforce development, and infrastructure investment across multiple counties.

== Concept of operations ==
Florida's RPCs are available to assist in the planning and implementation of state, federal, and local government programs. RPC staff bring a wide variety of skills in program design and implementation. Coordination among all levels of government promotes efficient resource allocation and effective regional planning.

Interlocal agreements may create separate legal or administrative entities (commissions, boards, or councils) to exercise powers shared by participating public agencies. All privileges, immunities, and exemptions that apply to municipalities and counties of the state also apply to these entities.

== See also ==
- Government of Florida
- Growth management
- Land use
- Regional planning
- Urban planning
- Zoning
