= Durant, Florida =

- Unincorporated community
- Location within Florida Location within the United States
- Coordinates: 27°54′31″N 82°11′10″W
- Country: United States
- State: Florida
- County: Hillsborough
- Elevation: 43 ft (13 m)
- Time zone: UTC-5 (Eastern (EST))
  - Summer (DST): UTC-4 (EDT)
- ZIP code: 33530
- Area code: 813
- GNIS feature ID: 281888

Durant is an unincorporated community in Hillsborough County, Florida, United States. The community is located on County Road 676, 6.4 miles (10.3 km) east-southeast of Brandon. Durant has a post office with ZIP code 33530, which opened on August 27, 1902.

== History ==
In 1895, the Sarasota Subdivision rail line was built from Durant to Sarasota and later extended north to Turkey Creek. The line was in use until it was acquired by CSX in 1981. CSX continued to store cars on the track in Durant until 1986.

The Edward Medard Park and Reservoir is located just north of Durant.

An F1 tornado struck Durant on January 22, 1973.

== Education ==
- Durant High School, home of the Cougars, is the only school in the Durant CDP. It was opened in August of 1995.
