= Boyette, Florida =

- Former CDP
- Location in Hillsborough County and the state of Florida
- Coordinates: 27°50′33″N 82°17′8″W
- Country: United States
- State: Florida
- County: Hillsborough

Area
  - Total: 6.9 sq mi (17.8 km^{2})
  - Land: 6.6 sq mi (17.1 km^{2})
  - Water: 0.27 sq mi (0.7 km^{2})
- Elevation: 82 ft (25 m)

Population (2000)
  - Total: 5,895
  - Density: 858/sq mi (331.2/km^{2})
- Time zone: UTC-5 (Eastern (EST))
  - Summer (DST): UTC-4 (EDT)
- FIPS code: 12-07825
- GNIS feature ID: 0295147

Boyette is an unincorporated community and former census-designated place in Hillsborough County, Florida, United States. The population was 5,895 at the 2000 census. The CDP area merged with Riverview in 2010.

== Geography ==
According to the United States Census Bureau, the CDP had a total area of 6.9 square miles (18 km^{2}), of which 6.6 square miles (17 km^{2}) was land and 0.3 square miles (0.78 km^{2}) (4.21%) was water.

== Demographics ==
As of the census of 2000, there were 5,895 people, 1,937 households, and 1,638 families residing in the community. The population density was 893.1 inhabitants per square mile (344.8/km^{2}). There were 2,103 housing units at an average density of 318.6 per square mile (123.0/km^{2}). The racial makeup of the community was 88.46% White, 5.39% African American, 0.63% Native American, 1.51% Asian, 0.07% Pacific Islander, 1.71% from other races, and 2.22% from two or more races. Hispanic or Latino of any race were 8.16% of the population.

There were 1,937 households, out of which 46.8% had children under the age of 18 living with them, 72.1% were married couples living together, 8.6% had a female householder with no husband present, and 15.4% were non-families. 11.2% of all households were made up of individuals, and 3.3% had someone living alone who was 65 years of age or older. The average household size was 3.04 and the average family size was 3.29.

In the community, the population was spread out, with 31.7% under the age of 18, 5.7% from 18 to 24, 32.9% from 25 to 44, 23.0% from 45 to 64, and 6.8% who were 65 years of age or older. The median age was 36 years. For every 100 females, there were 101.1 males. For every 100 females age 18 and over, there were 97.0 males.

The median income for a household in the community was $55,133, and the median income for a family was $56,818. Males had a median income of $41,446 versus $30,781 for females. The per capita income for the community was $21,057. About 5.5% of families and 5.9% of the population were below the poverty line, including 5.4% of those under age 18 and 6.8% of those age 65 or over.
