= Willow, Florida =

Human settlement in United States of America

Coordinates: 27°38′36″N 82°20′48″W

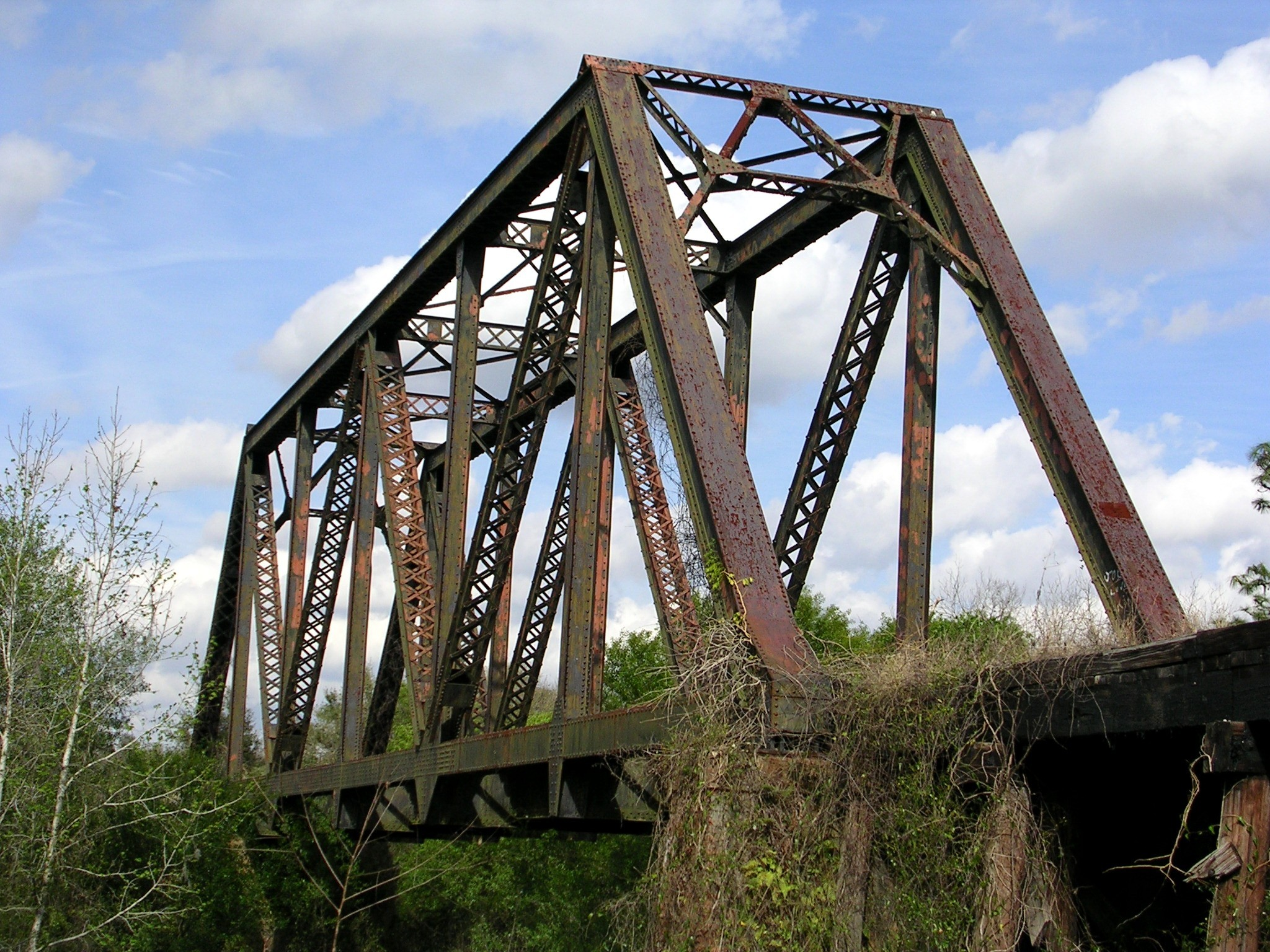
Railroad bridge near Willow

Willow is a ghost town in Manatee County, Florida, United States.

== Overview ==
In 1923 or 1924, a mill was built at Willow by the McGowin-Foshee Lumber Company from Alabama. The company leased 54,000 acres of land for logging. James I. Robbins, Bruce Robbins and James A. Robbins bought it in 1926. The Robbinses also bought 40,000 acres of woodlands that ran south to where State Road 70 is today. The area is believed to have included a sawmill, turpentine still, a planer mill, a dry kiln, Robbins family home, general store (known as the commissary), 75 to 80 worker houses with garden plots, a house of prostitution located on the Little Manatee River, Snowden's filling station, a post office constructed in 1889, a railroad depot with a water tower, and a church, school, and juke joint located in the black section of town. There was a narrow gauge railroad which had 3 engines, a service car and about 30 logging cars equipped with no brakes. At its height, as much as 50,000 board feet a day was cut. There were around 250 workers. They were paid in scrips (small round tokens) that were to be spent in the commissary and were also accepted in the house of prostitution. Willow was separated into white and black sections. The white section was the south end and the black section was the north end. The black children went to the school in Willow and the white children went to school north in the town of Wimauma.

The town failed with the onset of the Great Depression as the price of lumber dropped and the business moved to Tampa in 1937. The business's steam engine from its sawmill is on display at the Robbins Manufacturing Co., located in Tampa on Nebraska Avenue. A railroad single truss bridge crossing the Little Manatee River built in 1913 by the Seaboard Air Line Railroad Company remains, as do bare foundations of some of the old buildings. The railroad bridge needs a significant amount of repair before it can be used again and some of the rails leading to it on the south side have been removed, so that trains can not currently travel across it. On the north side of the railroad bridge, at about Saffold Road, all of the rails have been removed from the rest of this route north to Durant. This abandonment occurred in 1986.

At Willow, there is a railroad spur that leads east off of the mainline to a Florida Power & Light Company plant. CSX Transportation provides current rail service to the plant.

As of 2009, the Florida Railroad Museum was expanding its facilities in Willow where restoration and repair work is conducted. There is a new railroad depot now at Willow built by the Florida Railroad Museum. The Museum has put a fence around the depot and its maintenance facilities at Willow and has installed security cameras. On weekends, some of the museum’s volunteers who live in other distant towns will stay overnight in Willow in the restored passenger car sleepers on Friday and Saturday nights so they can work at the museum for the entire weekend.

== See also ==
- List of ghost towns in Florida
