= Turkey Creek, Florida =

Unincorporated community in Florida, US

- Unincorporated community
- Location within Florida Location within the United States
- Coordinates: 27°58′41″N 82°11′05″W
- Country: United States
- State: Florida
- County: Hillsborough
- Elevation: 95 ft (29 m)
- Time zone: UTC-5 (Eastern (EST))
  - Summer (DST): UTC-4 (EDT)
- ZIP codes: 33567
- GNIS feature ID: 292508

Turkey Creek is a rural unincorporated community located in eastern Hillsborough County, Florida, United States.

== Geography ==
Turkey Creek is located approximately three miles west-southwest of Plant City. It is also located southeast of Dover and northeast of Sydney.

== Description ==
Turkey Creek's approximate boundaries include Sydney Washer Road to the west, Sydney Road to the north, Mud Lake Road to the east and State Road 60 to the south.
