= DuPont—Lakeland Line =

Atlantic Coast Line Railroad line in Georgia and Florida

Overview
- Other name(s): DuPont Subdivision; West Coast Subdivision
- Status: Some segments are still operating
- Owner: Atlantic Coast Line Railroad (1900-1967); Seaboard Coast Line Railroad (1967-1986); CSX Transportation (1986-1987)
- Termini: DuPont, Georgia; Lakeland, Florida

Technical
- Line length: 234.2 mi (376.9 km)
- Track gauge: 1,435 mm (4 ft 8 1/2 in) standard gauge
- Electrification: No

The Atlantic Coast Line Railroad's DuPont—Lakeland Line (R Line) was a historic rail line in southern Georgia and the northern west coast of Florida. On employee timetables, the line was actually divided into the DuPont—High Springs Line (which was part of the company's Waycross District) and the High Springs—Lakeland Line (which was part of the company's Ocala District). The line was primarily used for freight, though some passenger services ran on parts of it in Florida. While parts of the line were built as early as 1863, the full line was not complete until 1913. Parts of the line in Florida are still active today.

== Route description ==
The DuPont—Lakeland Line began in DuPont, Georgia at the Atlantic Coast Line's Waycross—Thomasville Line. From DuPont, it proceeded south into Florida and passing through Live Oak and Branford. From Branford, the line turned southeast to High Springs, where the Atlantic Coast Line operated a major freight yard.

From High Springs, the line continued south to Newberry, Williston, Dunnellon, Inverness, and Dade City before coming to an end just south of their Lakeland Yard at Lakeland Junction, where it connected with the Atlantic Coast Line's main line.

The DuPont—Lakeland Line connected with the Atlantic Coast Line's High Springs—Croom Line in both locations, the Thomasville—Dunnellon Line in Dunnellon, the St. Petersburg Line in Trilby, and the Vitis—Tampa Line at Vitis Junction.

=== Branches ===
The line also had three smaller branch lines. The Lake City Branch ran from Lake City Junction (between Branford and High Springs) to Lake City. The Ocala Branch ran from Rainbow Falls east to Ocala, and the Homosassa Branch (also known as the Crystal River Branch) ran from just south of Dunnellon to Crystal River and Homosassa.

== History ==
=== Construction and early years ===
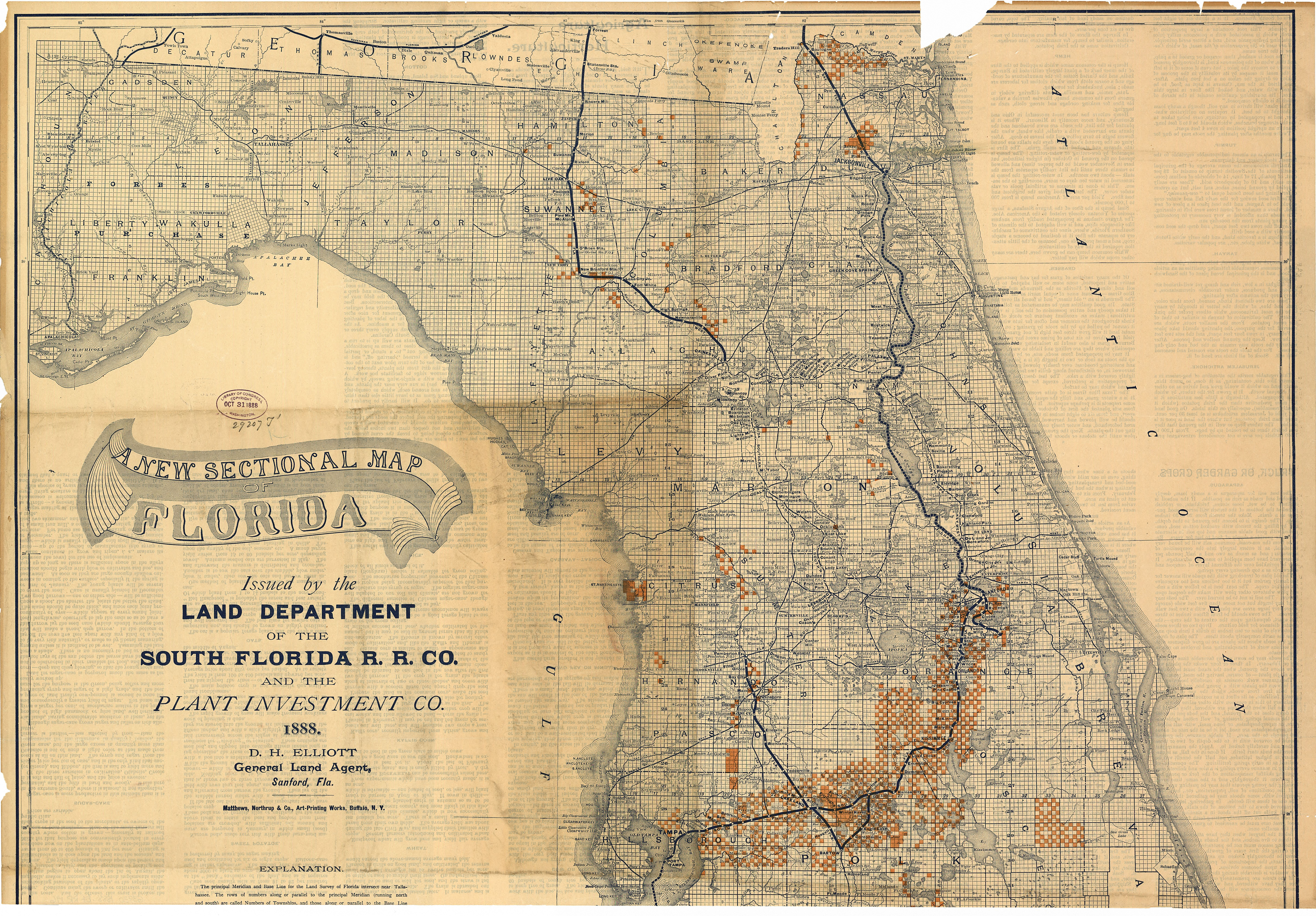
1888 map showing early segments of the DuPont—Lakeland Line and other lines

The DuPont—Lakeland Line was built in segments from 1863 to 1913 with most of the line being built by the Atlantic Coast Line's predecessor railroads.

The north end of the line from DuPont to Live Oak, Florida was the first segment of the line to open. It opened in 1863 and was originally the Florida Division of the Atlantic and Gulf Railroad. It was the first railroad line to cross the Georgia/Florida border. The Atlantic and Gulf Railroad later became the Savannah, Florida and Western Railway, which was the main railroad of Henry B. Plant's system of railroads. Plant then sought to expand his railroad system further into Florida and hoped to reach Charlotte Harbor. He then chartered the Live Oak and Rowlands Bluff Railroad and the Live Oak, Tampa and Charlotte Harbor Railroad to continue the line from Live Oak via High Springs to Gainesville, which opened in 1883 (track from High Springs to Gainesville would become part of the High Springs—Croom Line). The Live Oak, Tampa and Charlotte Harbor Railroad also built the Lake City Branch. In 1893, track was built from High Springs south to Archer.

The first segment of the line on the south end was built in 1884 from Lakeland north to Pemberton Ferry (later known as Croom). This segment was built by the South Florida Railroad and was the northern leg of their Pemberton Ferry Branch.

In 1887, the Silver Springs, Ocala and Gulf Railroad (SSO&G) built the segment of the line from Juliette (known today as Rainbow Falls) south to Dunnellon as part of their network. The SSO&G also built track to Ocala and Homosassa at the same time (which became the Ocala and Homosassa branches). One of the early organizers of the SSO&G was John F. Dunn, for whom Dunnellon is partially named for. In 1891, SSO&G built track from Dunnellon south to Inverness. At the same time, the South Florida Railroad extended their Pemberton Ferry Branch north to Inverness, linking the two railroads. In 1893, the SSO&G built track from Rainbow Falls north to Morriston.

The South Florida Railroad and the Silver Springs, Ocala and Gulf Railroad were incorporated into the Plant System in 1893 and 1901 respectively. In 1902, the Plant System was bought by the Atlantic Coast Line Railroad. The Atlantic Coast Line would then built track from Archer to Morriston in 1913, which was the final link in what would become the DuPont—Lakeland Line (R Line).

=== Height of operation ===
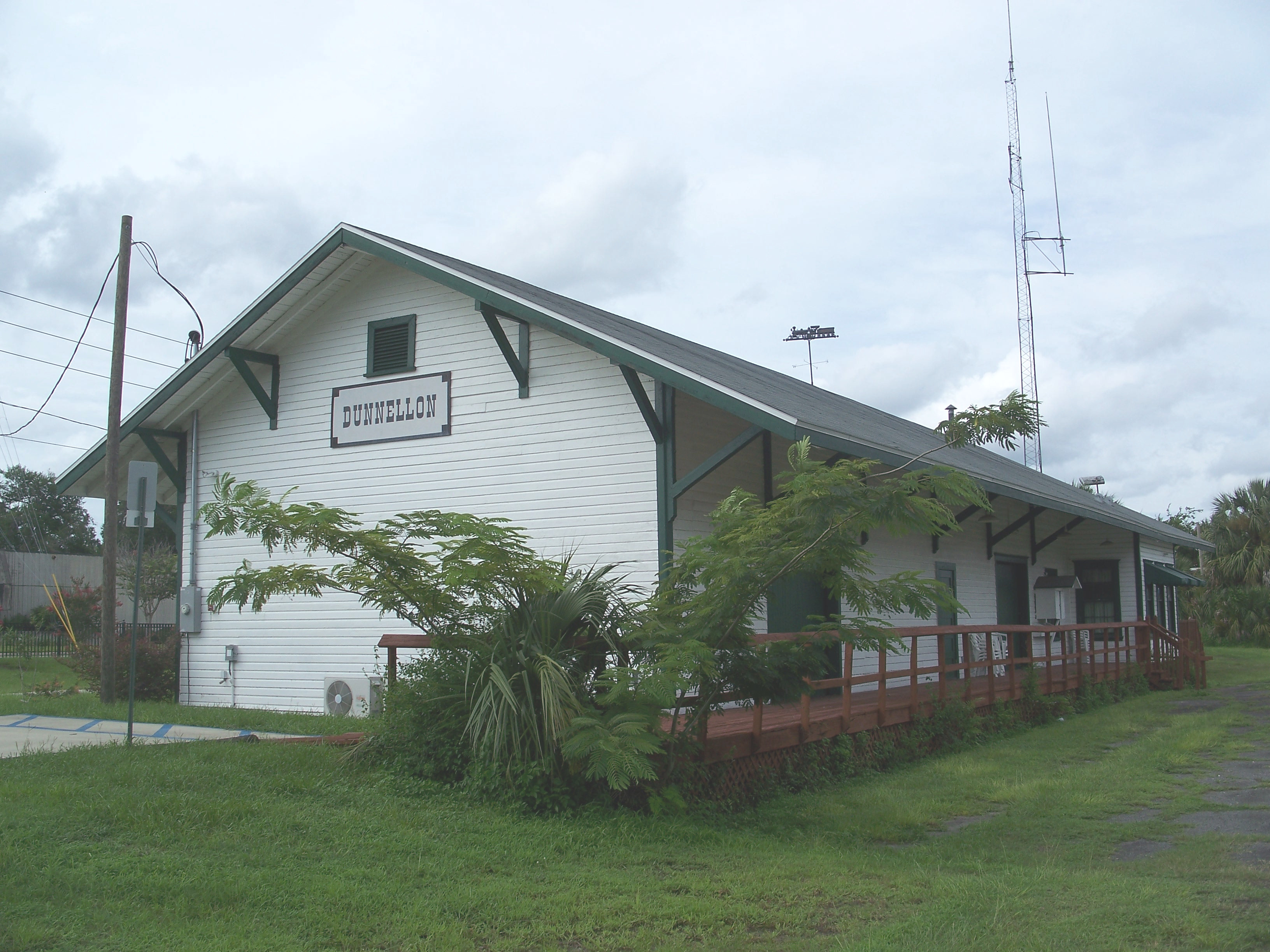
Dunnellon station

The DuPont—Lakeland Line would become a busy route for the Atlantic Coast Line in the 1920s. During the decade, both High Springs Yard and Lakeland Yard were expanded. The Atlantic Coast Line also extended its branch from Tampa to Thonotosassa (originally built by the Tampa and Thonotosassa Railroad) northeast to connect with the DuPont—Lakeland Line near Richland providing a more direct route to Tampa. The junction created from this extension was named Vitis Junction. The DuPont—Lakeland Line was also double tracked between Vitis Junction and Dunnellon, where it connected to the Atlantic Coast Line's newly-built Perry Cutoff. Construction of the Perry Cutoff, the Vitis—Tampa Line, and the double track were complete by 1928. Three round trip passenger trains ran this section of the line for much of its history. The Southland ran the line daily from the Perry Cutoff to Tampa via Vitis Junction with stops at Dunnellon, Inverness, Trilby and Dade City. The Atlantic Coast Line's West Coast Champion and an additional local passenger train also ran the line daily between Croom and Trilby (where they continued southwest to St. Petersburg). Additionally, local mixed trains (consisting of both passengers and freight) ran the full line from DuPont to Lakeland until they were discontinued in the 1940s. The Southland was discontinued in 1957.

In 1941, the Homosassa Branch was abandoned between Homosassa and Cutlers. More of the branch was abandoned between Cutlers and Crystal River in the 1960s. The Ocala and Lake City Branches were also abandoned in the 1960s.

By the 1950s, a considerable amount of freight traffic was also running the line. The line was the Atlantic Coast Line's primary route for freight trains running between Waycross, Georgia and Tampa, Florida. At least two through freight trains ran the line round-trip daily from DuPont to Vitis Junction on their route from Waycross to Tampa with a stop at High Springs Yard. One additional through freight train also ran round-trip daily from High Springs to Tampa via Vitis Junction and another through freight train ran from High Springs to Lakeland round-trip daily. Separate local freight trains also ran from DuPont to High Springs and from High Springs to Lakeland three days a week. Local freight trains also ran on the Lake City and Crystal River branches several times a week.

=== Great Train Wreck of 1956 ===
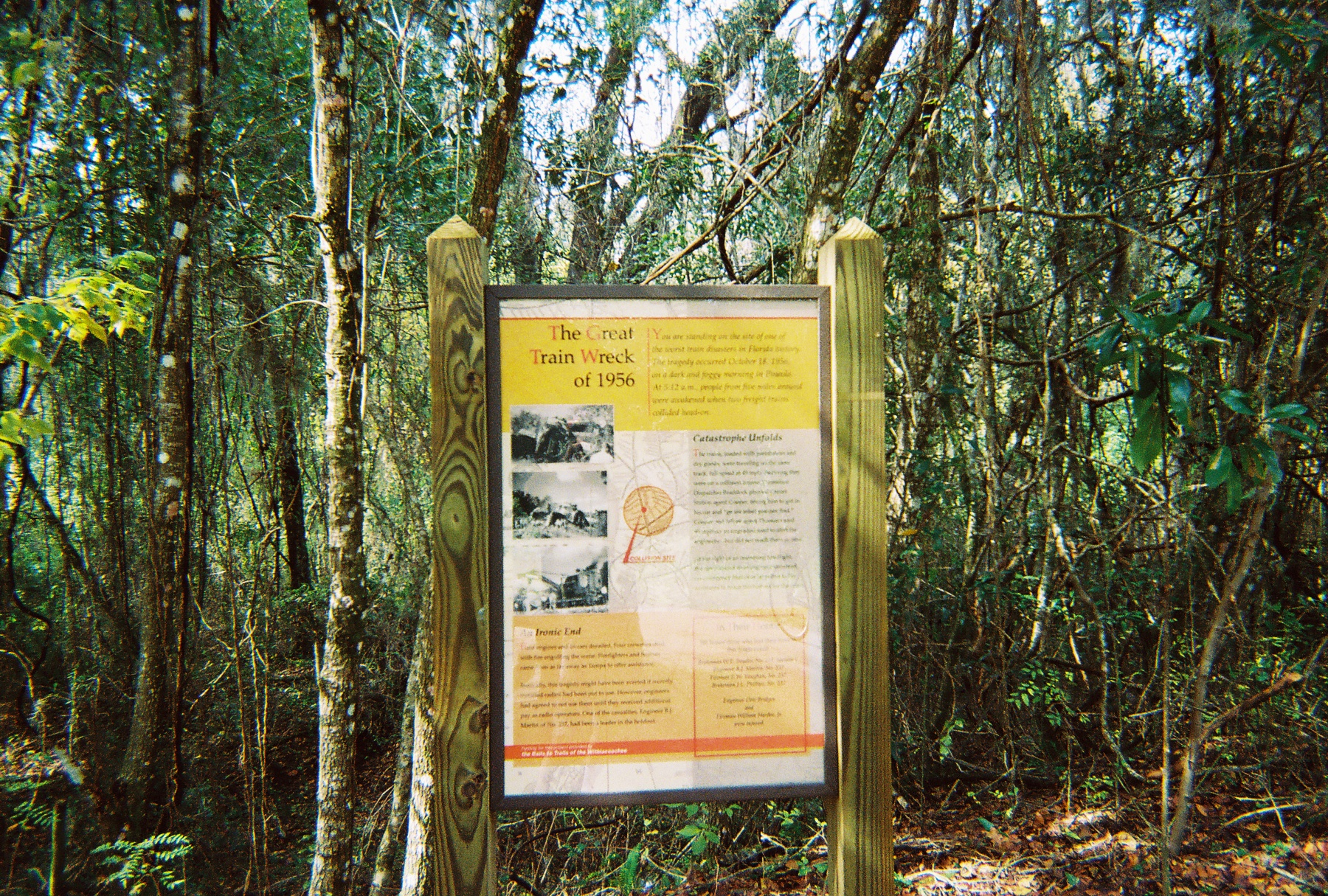
Historical sign for the Great Train Wreck of 1956

On October 18, 1956, a head-on collision between two Atlantic Coast Line Railroad freight trains occurred near Pineola killing four crewmen. The crash is known as "The Great Train Wreck of 1956," and signpost at the site of the crash on the Withlacoochee State Trail memorializes the event today.

=== Later years ===
The Atlantic Coast Line became the Seaboard Coast Line Railroad (SCL) in 1967 after merging with their rival, the Seaboard Air Line Railroad (SAL). At the time of the merger, the Seaboard Air Line's Brooksville Subdivision closely paralleled the High Springs—Lakeland Line though Inverness, Dunnellon, and Morriston. The lines even crossed each other twice (once just south of Dunnellon and again near Rainbow Springs where the Juliette Falls Golf Course's driving range is currently located).

The merged company adopted the Seaboard Air Line's method of naming their lines as subdivisions. As a result, the DuPont—High Springs Line north of High Springs was designated as the DuPont Subdivision on employee timetables, and the West Coast Subdivision from High Springs to Lakeland. The former Vitis—Tampa Line was also classified as part of the West Coast Subdivision. Though by the end of 1967, the line from Vitis Junction to Lakeland was redesignated as the Vitis Subdivision. The Crystal River Branch was designated the Crystal River Subdivision.

Much of the parallel Seaboard Air Line Brooksville Subdivision from Archer to Inverness was also abandoned in the wake of the merger due to its proximity to the West Coast Subdivision. A local passenger train continued to run the line the short distance from Croom to Trilby on its route from Jacksonville to St. Petersburg until 1971, when all of the Seaboard Coast Line's passenger trains were taken over by Amtrak.

In 1980, the Seaboard Coast Line's parent company merged with the Chessie System, creating the CSX Corporation. The CSX Corporation initially operated the Chessie and Seaboard Systems separately until 1986, when they were merged into CSX Transportation. Lakeland Yard closed in the 1980s and traffic was then relocated to nearby Winston Yard just four miles west of Lakeland Junction on the A Line (the former Atlantic Coast Line Main Line). By 1982, the Crystal River Subdivision was abandoned south of Red Level Junction.

In 1987, only a year after completing the transition to CSX, the company abandoned 46 miles of the West Coast Subdivision between Gulf Junction (in Dunnellon) to its connection with the S Line at Owensboro. CSX abandoned the line from DuPont to High Springs in 1988.

From 1990 to 2004, Amtrak operated service on the line between Lakeland and Owensboro which also ran on the S Line further north. This service was operated by the Silver Star, Silver Palm, and the Palmetto at various times through this period.

== Current operations ==
Today, the former DuPont—Lakeland line still exists in two segments.

=== Vitis Subdivision ===
The southernmost 20 miles of the line from Lakeland Junction to Vitis Junction is still operating as CSX's Vitis Subdivision. Today, it serves as a connection between CSX's S Line (the former Seaboard Air Line Main Line) and A Line. CSX's freight trains from the north heading to Winston Yard, southern Orlando, and Miami continue to operate over the Vitis Subdivision.

The Vitis Subdivision crosses Interstate 4 on an overpass just west of Kathleen Road interchange (mile marker 31) near Lakeland. The Florida Department of Transportation is in the process of replacing the overpass with a new structure that will be wider to accommodate two tracks for the railroad, as well as longer to accommodate future expansion of Interstate 4 underneath.

The former Lakeland Yard at the south end of the line is now the site of Bonnet Springs Park.

=== North of Vitis Junction ===
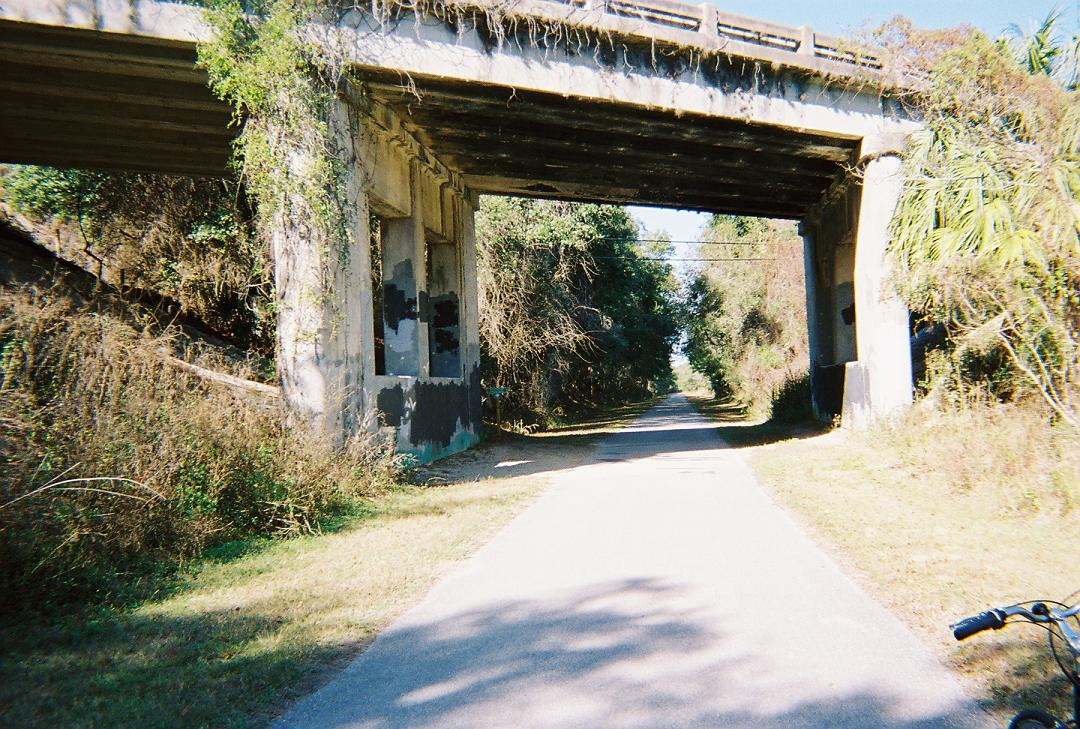
Withlacoochee State Trail on the former right of way near Inverness

From Vitis Junction north to Owensboro, the line is now the southernmost part of CSX's Wildwood Subdivision, which continues up the S Line north of Owensboro.

The abandoned right of way from Owensboro to Dunnellon is now the Withlacoochee State Trail, the longest rail trail in Florida.

The line north of Dunnellon to High Springs and the remaining Crystal River Branch to Red Level was taken over by the shortline Florida Northern Railroad in 1988. The Florida Northern abandoned the line north of Newberry to High Springs in 2014, which was the last railroad track remaining in the once busy railroad hub of High Springs.'

From Fort White to south of O'Brien, the line is part of the Suwannee River Greenway. It was also replaced by the Heritage Trail southeast of Live Oak. A third trail replaced the line in Jasper between northbound and southbound Central Avenue, which is being expanded south of the city.

== Historic stations ==
DuPont to Lakeland
State	Milepost	City	Station	Image	Connections and notes
GA	AR 622.3	DuPont	DuPont		junction with Waycross—Montgomery Line originally Lawton
GA	AR 627.9		Coastine		
GA	AR 632.5		Haylow		junction with: Atlantic, Valdosta and Western Railway (GSF/SOU); Statenville Railway (GSF/SOU)
GA	AR 638.0		Alexis		
GA	AR 642.8	Tarver	Tarver		
FL	AR 650.4		Baker's Mill		
FL	AR 654.5	Jasper	Jasper		junction with Georgia Southern and Florida Railway (SOU)
FL	AR 659.9		Marion		
FL	AR 663.7		Suwanee		
FL	AR 665.2		Kemp		
FL	AR 670.5	Live Oak	Live Oak Union Depot		junction with: Seaboard Air Line Railroad Tallahassee Subdivision; Live Oak and Perry Railroad; Florida Railway
FL	AR 674.9	Padlock	Padlock		
FL	AR 682.8	McAlpin	McAlpin		
FL	AR 688.5	O'Brien	O'Brien		
FL	AR 694.2	Branford	Branford		originally Rowlands Bluff
FL	AR 701.4	Hildreth	Hildreth		
FL	AR 705.0	Ichetucknee; Springs State Park	Lake City Junction		junction with Lake City Branch
FL	AR 707.7	Fort White	Fort White		
FL	AR 717.1	High Springs	High Springs		junction with High Springs—Croom Line station located on High Springs—Croom Line
FL	AR 721.4		Clark		
FL	AR 727.9		Lexington		
FL	AR 731.1	Newberry	Newberry		junction with Jacksonville—Wilcox Line
FL	AR 734.7		Half Moon		
FL	AR 740.8	Archer	Archer		junction with Seaboard Air Line Railroad Cedar Key Branch
FL	AR 746.3		Alderney		
FL	AR 752.1	Williston	Williston		
FL	AR 756.4		Montbrook		junction with Seaboard Air Line Railroad Brooksville Subdivision
FL	AR 759.6	Morriston	Morriston		
FL	AR 764.4	Romeo	Romeo		
FL	AR 772.0	Rainbow Springs	Rainbow Falls		originally Juliette junction with Ocala Branch
FL	AR 773.9	Chatmire	Blue Run		Currently the site of the Blue Run Yard
FL	AR 776.5	Dunnellon	Dunnellon		junction with Atlantic Coast Line Railroad Thomasville—Dunnellon Line
FL	AR 777.5	Citrus Springs	Gulf Junction		junction with Homosassa Branch
FL	AR 780.1	Citrus Springs	Gibara		
FL	AR 783.5	Citrus Springs	Ladonia		
FL	AR 788.8	Hernando	Hernando		
FL	AR 794.3	Inverness	Inverness		
FL	AR 801.1	Floral City	Floral City		
FL	AR 805.3	Floral City	South Floral City		
FL	AR 812.2	Istachatta	Istachatta		
FL	AR 814.5	Croom	Croom		originally Pemberton Ferry junction with Atlantic Coast Line Railroad High Springs—Croom Line
FL	AR 823.3	Trilby	Trilby		junction with Atlantic Coast Line Railroad Trilby—St. Petersburg Line
FL	AR 824.7	Owensboro	Owensboro		junction with Seaboard Air Line Railroad Main Line
FL	AR 830.2	Dade City	Dade City		
FL	AR 836.9	Vitis	Vitis Junction		junction with Atlantic Coast Line Railroad Vitis—Tampa Line
FL	AR 842.1		Millard		
FL	AR 846.2		Stokes		
FL	AR 849.8	Kathleen	Kathleen		
FL	AR 856.5	Lakeland	Lakeland Junction		junction with Atlantic Coast Line Railroad Main Line; Passenger station located on Main Line

Lake City Branch
Milepost	City	Station	Image	Connections and notes
ARA 705.0	Ichetucknee; Springs State Park	Lake City Junction		junction with DuPont—Lakeland Line
ARA 713.0	Columbia City	Columbia		
ARA 723.7	Lake City	Lake City		junction with: Seaboard Air Line Railroad Tallahassee Subdivision; Georgia Southern & Florida Railway (SOU)

Ocala Branch
Milepost	City	Station	Image	Connections and notes
ARC 772.0	Rainbow Springs	Rainbow Falls		originally Juliette junction with DuPont—Lakeland Line
ARC 775.3		Rock Springs		
ARC 779.3		Leroy		
ARC 780.0		York		
ARC 783.4		Martel		
ARC 791.5	Ocala	Ocala		junction with: Atlantic Coast Line Railroad High Springs—Croom Line; Seaboard Air Line Railroad Main Line

Homosassa (Crystal River) Branch
Milepost	City	Station	Image	Connections and notes
ARD 777.5	Citrus Springs	Gulf Junction		junction with DuPont—Lakeland Line
ARD 784.6	Citronelle	Citronelle		
ARD 785.7	Citronelle	Red Level Junction		junction with spur built in the 1960s to Crystal River Energy Complex
ARD 790.1	Crystal River	Crystal River		
ARD 792.8		Cutlers		
ARD 799.5	Homosassa	Homosassa		

== See also ==
- Perry Cutoff
- Main Line (Atlantic Coast Line Railroad)
- High Springs—Croom Line
- Lakeland—Fort Myers Line
