= Marietta station (Georgia) =

Coordinates: 33°57′11″N 84°33′04″W

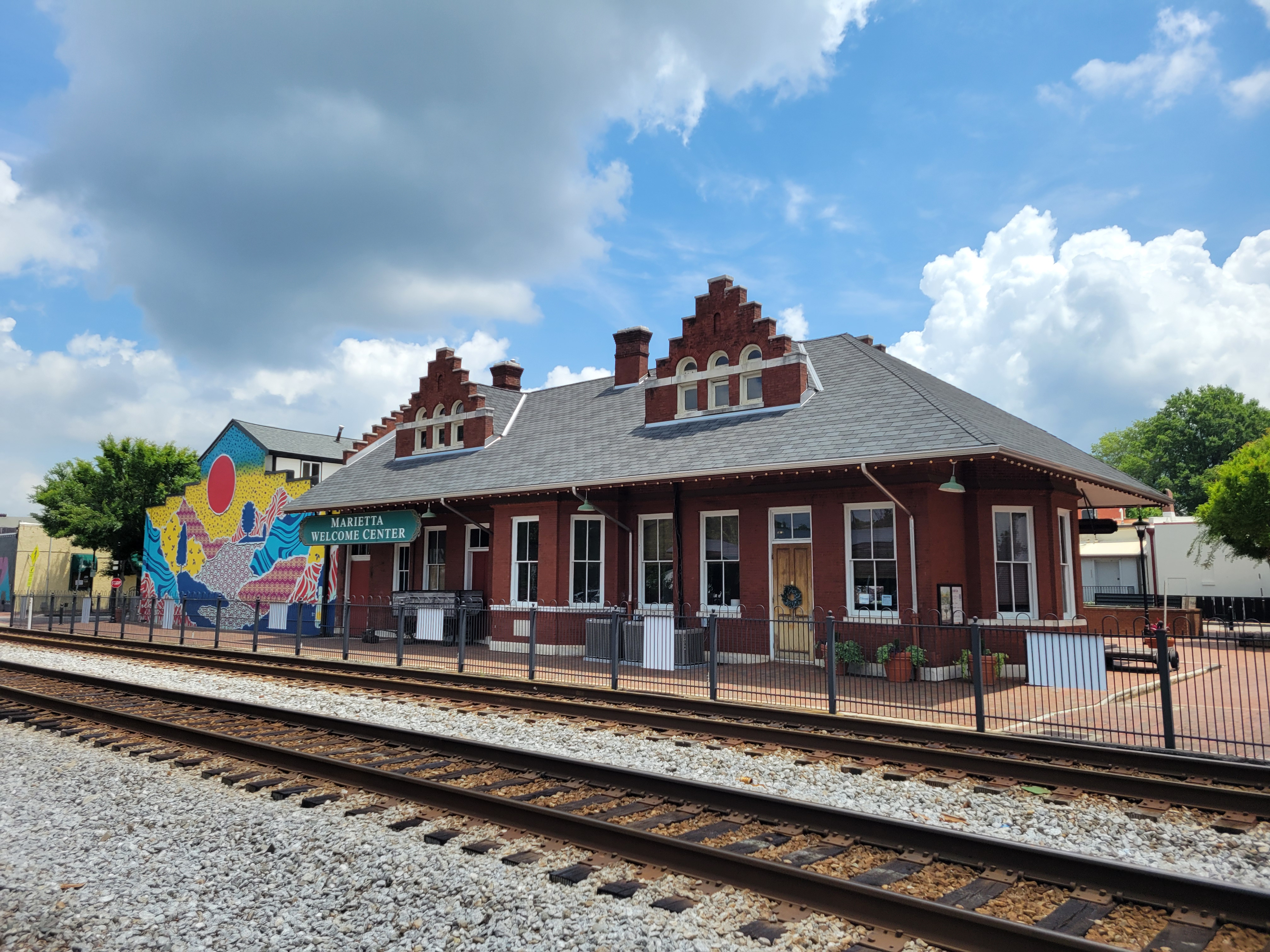
Marietta Depot

The Marietta depot is a former freight and passenger stop in Marietta, Georgia. It was originally built in 1864 for the Western and Atlantic Railroad, a railroad between Chattanooga, Tennessee and Atlanta, Georgia. That railroad was absorbed by the Nashville, Chattanooga and St. Louis Railway. In turn, the latter railroad was merged into the Louisville and Nashville Railroad in 1957.

The station was burned down by the Union troops of Gen. William Tecumseh Sherman in the latter years of the US. Civil War. It was rebuilt in 1898.

Presently occupying the building is the Marietta Welcome Center and Visitors Bureau. The city of Marietta bought the building from the State of Georgia toward the end of 2019.

== Passenger services ==
In 1946 the depot had the following Louisville & Nashville passenger operations:

- Flamingo (Cincinnati - Florida)
- Southland (Chicago - Florida)
- unnamed local train between Knoxville and Atlanta via Blue Ridge

In the same year the station had the following Nashville, Chattanooga & St. Louis passenger operations:

- Dixie Flyer (Chicago, north branch and St. Louis, west branch - Nashville - Atlanta - Jacksonville - Miami and various Florida Gulf Coast points)
- Dixie Limited (Chicago, north branch and St. Louis, west branch - Nashville - Atlanta - Jacksonville - Miami and various Florida Gulf Coast points)
- unnamed local night train between Nashville and Atlanta, with timed connection in Nashville to local train to Memphis

By 1961, the operations, then all run by the Louisville and Nashville, making stops were:

- Dixie Flyer (Chicago - Miami)
- Flamingo (Cincinnati - Jacksonville)
- Georgian (Chicago and St. Louis - Atlanta)
- unnamed local night train between Nashville and Atlanta

== Demise ==
In 1968 the Georgian was eliminated. In its place was an unnamed St. Louis-Evansville train, and an unnamed Evansville-Atlanta train. These two trains were among the trains that Amtrak chose not to pick up when it assumed long-distance operations on May 1, 1971. Thus, passenger service through Marietta ended.

== See also ==
- Atlanta Union Station (1930)
- Atlantic Coast Line Railroad
- Union Station (Chattanooga)
- Union Station (Nashville)

Preceding station	Louisville and Nashville Railroad	Following station
Woodstock toward Cincinnati	Cincinnati – Atlanta	Atlanta Terminus
Woodstock toward Knoxville	Knoxville – Atlanta	Atlanta Terminus
Woodstock toward Louisville	Louisville – Atlanta	Atlanta Terminus
Preceding station	Nashville, Chattanooga and St. Louis Railway	Following station
Elizabeth toward Memphis	Main Line	Smyrna toward Atlanta
