= Tampa and Thonotosassa Railroad =

Railroad line in Florida, U.S.

- Interactive map of the Tampa and Thonotosassa Railroad (red) and the extension to Vitis (dark red)

Overview
- Locale: Hillsborough County, Florida
- Dates of operation: 1893–1901
- Successor: Plant System; Atlantic Coast Line Railroad

Technical
- Track gauge: 4 ft 8 1/2 in (1,435 mm) standard gauge

The Tampa and Thonotosassa Railroad was a 13-mile railroad line running from Tampa, Florida northeast to Thonotosassa. The line began operation in 1893 and began at a junction with the South Florida Railroad in Tampa. The line had a station in Thonotosassa. The line was bought out by the Plant System in 1901 which was then sold to the Atlantic Coast Line Railroad in 1902.

In the 1920s, the Atlantic Coast Line extended the Tampa and Thonotosassa line northeast through Zephyrhills to a point near Richland and Lumberton to meet their High Springs—Lakeland Line. This junction would become known as Vitis Junction. The Coast Line would designate the full line as the Vitis–Tampa Line (RF Line) and it gave the Atlantic Coast Line an additional route into Tampa from northern Florida. The extension crossed the Seaboard Air Line Railroad's main line at Zephyrhills. Around the same time, the Atlantic Coast Line also double-tracked their High Springs–Lakeland Line north of Vitis Junction to Dunnellon to accommodate the additional traffic from the extension. By 1949, the RF line carried three round-trip freight trains daily and was also used daily by the Atlantic Coast Line's Southland passenger train to reach Tampa Union Station.

The Atlantic Coast Line and Seaboard Air Line merged in 1967 becoming the Seaboard Coast Line Railroad. The Seaboard Coast Line continued to operate the line as the southernmost part of their West Coast Subdivision (which also included the AR Line up to High Springs). By 1969, the line was no longer being used by passenger trains and only had one daily through freight train running on it. By this time, the line was largely redundant and was abandoned between Zephyrhills and a point near Temple Terrace in the early 1970s. The Seaboard Coast Line became CSX Transportation in 1986.

Today, all that remains of the line are two short segments at each end. At the south end, the line still runs from Tampa northeast to a point just south of Temple Terrace. This track is part of CSX's Tampa Terminal Subdivision and is more specifically known as Neve Spur. Currently, Neve Wye is notable due to its use by Amtrak to turn its Floridian train around so it can be backed into Tampa Union Station.

At the north end, the line's extension is still in service from Zephyrhills to Vitis Junction, which continues to be a busy junction for CSX. This segment is now the southernmost segment of CSX's Wildwood Subdivision. This segment is unofficially considered to be part of the CSX S Line even though it is a short detour of an abandoned segment of the original S Line. US 301 runs along some of the line's abandoned right of way.

== Station listing ==
Milepost	City/Location	Station	Connections and notes
A 881.7	Tampa	Tampa Union Station	located on Atlantic Coast Line Railroad Main Line
A 879.6; ARF 865.7	Tampa	Thonotosassa Junction	junction with Atlantic Coast Line Railroad Main Line
ARF 859.6		Temple Terrace Junction	
ARF 855.0	Thonotosassa	Thonotosassa	
Extension to Vitis
ARF 846.3		Glennell	
ARF 840.7	Zephyrhills	Zephyrhills	junction with Seaboard Air Line Railroad Main Line
ARF 836.7		Vitis Junction	junction with Atlantic Coast Line Railroad High Springs—Lakeland Line
