= Flamingo (train) =

Former American passenger train

Overview
- Service type: Inter-city rail
- Status: Discontinued
- Locale: Midwestern United States/Southeastern United States
- First service: September 27, 1925
- Last service: March 7, 1968
- Former operators: Louisville and Nashville Railroad, Atlantic Coast Line Railroad

Route
- Termini: Cincinnati, Ohio; Jacksonville, Florida; Atlanta, Georgia, beginning in 1962
- Distance travelled: 886 miles (1,426 km)
- Average journey time: Southbound: 25 hrs 30 min Northbound: 24 hrs 5 min
- Service frequency: Daily
- Train numbers: 17, 101 (southbound), 18, 102 (northbound)

On-board services
- Seating arrangements: Reclining seat coaches
- Sleeping arrangements: Sections, roomettes, and double bedrooms (1955)
- Catering facilities: Diner

The Flamingo was a passenger train operated by the Louisville and Nashville Railroad and the Atlantic Coast Line Railroad between Cincinnati, Ohio, and Jacksonville, Florida, from the 1920s to the 1960s. It carried coaches and sleeping cars.

== History ==
Inaugurated on September 27, 1925, it operated between Cincinnati and Jacksonville, Florida, with sleeper service between Cincinnati Union Terminal and Atlanta Union Station. It was operated in conjunction with the Central of Georgia Railway and the Atlantic Coast Line Railroad. The train would split at Atlanta, with one branch going via the ACL line via Cordele, and the other going through the Central of Georgia's line to Albany. On the branch from Albany to Jacksonville, the Flamingo ran in tandem with the Illinois Central's Seminole, departing stations with an identical schedule for that final segment. In Jacksonville, riders could continue their trips to elsewhere in Florida on various ACL branch lines that served different parts of the state, such as St. Petersburg, Sarasota (via Orlando and Tampa), Ft. Myers and Miami. Travellers to Miami would transfer in Jacksonville to the FEC's Havana Special. The Southland operated on similar route from Cincinnati to Albany portion, however, the Southland ran overnight through Georgia.

An empty oil tanker that had been attached to a north-bound freight train came loose and hit and wrecked the Flamingo near Falmouth, Kentucky in 1957. The injured received care at a local hospital.

Service was truncated to Atlanta in 1962; by September 8, 1965, the name was removed from the train. It was discontinued on March 7, 1968.

The dining car, originally built in 1948, was restored and returned to service by the Kentucky-Indiana Rail Advocates in 1998, serving up food on the dinner train from original recipes like seafood gumbo, lamb, plum pudding, and ham with red eye gravy.

== Major stations served ==
- Cincinnati Union Station
- Covington, Kentucky
- Winchester, Kentucky
- Corbin, Kentucky (with connections to and from Louisville to the west)
- Knoxville L&N Station
- Cartersville, Georgia
- Marietta Depot
- Atlanta Union Station
- Atlanta Terminal Station
- Albany Union Station
- Jacksonville Union Station
