= Atlanta Union Station (1930) =

Smaller of two principal train stations in downtown Atlanta

Coordinates: 33.755°N 84.3925°W

Union Station
- Union Station in 1946.

General information
- System: Inter-city rail

History
- Opened: 1930
- Closed: 1971 (demolished 1972)

Services
Preceding station	Atlantic Coast Line Railroad	Following station
Terminus	AB&C Atlanta – Waycross	Ben Hill toward Waycross
Preceding station	Georgia Railroad	Following station
Terminus	Main Line	Decatur toward Augusta
Preceding station	Louisville and Nashville Railroad	Following station
Marietta toward Cincinnati	Cincinnati – Atlanta	Terminus
Marietta toward Knoxville	Knoxville – Atlanta	Terminus
Marietta toward Louisville	Louisville – Atlanta	Terminus
Preceding station	Nashville, Chattanooga and St. Louis Railway	Following station
Bolton toward Memphis	Main Line	Terminus
Location

The Union Station built in 1930 in Atlanta was the smaller of two principal train stations in downtown, Terminal Station being the other (the latter served Southern Railway, Seaboard Air Line, Central of Georgia (including the Nancy Hanks to Savannah), and the Atlanta and West Point). It was the third "union station" or "union depot" (usage varied in the 19th century), succeeding the 1853 station, which the U.S. military destroyed in November 1864 along with other Confederate war infrastructure, and the 1871 station.

== Overview ==
The station was located over the tracks between Forsyth and Spring Streets, three blocks west and one block south of the predecessor union stations.

The site is the block immediately west of the present day Five Points MARTA station.

Opening on April 18, 1930, the third Union Station served the Georgia Railroad, Atlantic Coast Line (previously the Atlanta, Birmingham and Coast Railroad), and Louisville and Nashville (previously the Nashville, Chattanooga and St. Louis Railway). It replaced earlier stations on the same site.

Major trains and destinations:

- Atlantic Coast Line -in partnership with L&N:
  - The Dixie Flagler – Chicago, via Chattanooga, TN, Nashville, TN and Evansville, IN; continuing south to Jacksonville and Miami, FL
  - The Dixie Flyer – Chicago, via Chattanooga, TN, Nashville, TN and Evansville, IN; continuing south to Jacksonville and Tampa, FL; shortened in 1965 to an Atlanta to Jacksonville ACL route.
- Georgia Railroad:
  - The Georgia Cannonball - Augusta, GA for connecting trains to Atlantic Coast Line Railroad service (e.g., Palmetto) and to Southern Railway service (Aiken-Augusta Special)
- Louisville and Nashville:
  - The Flamingo – Cincinnati, via Knoxville, TN; continuing south to Jacksonville, FL, via Albany
  - The Georgian – Chicago, via Nashville and Evansville
  - The Southland - Chicago, via Cincinnati, OH, Knoxville, TN; continuing south to Macon, then branching to various points in Florida. This train traveled to Terminal Station before going south to Trilby and Florida.

After the tenant railroads of Union Station had discontinued all their passenger trains (the last such train operated on April 30, 1971, the day before Amtrak came into existence), demolition started in August 1971, and the station was razed in 1972.

Remnants of the platform may be seen behind the Atlanta Journal-Constitution building although construction of Underground Atlanta and MARTA largely obliterated the site.

There have been various proposals for new intermodal passenger stations within the vicinity of the former Union Station, however, none have advanced beyond the initial planning. The Atlanta area is currently served by the Peachtree station by Amtrak.
