= Knoxville station (Louisville and Nashville Railroad) =

- Louisville and Nashville Passenger Station
- U.S. National Register of Historic Places
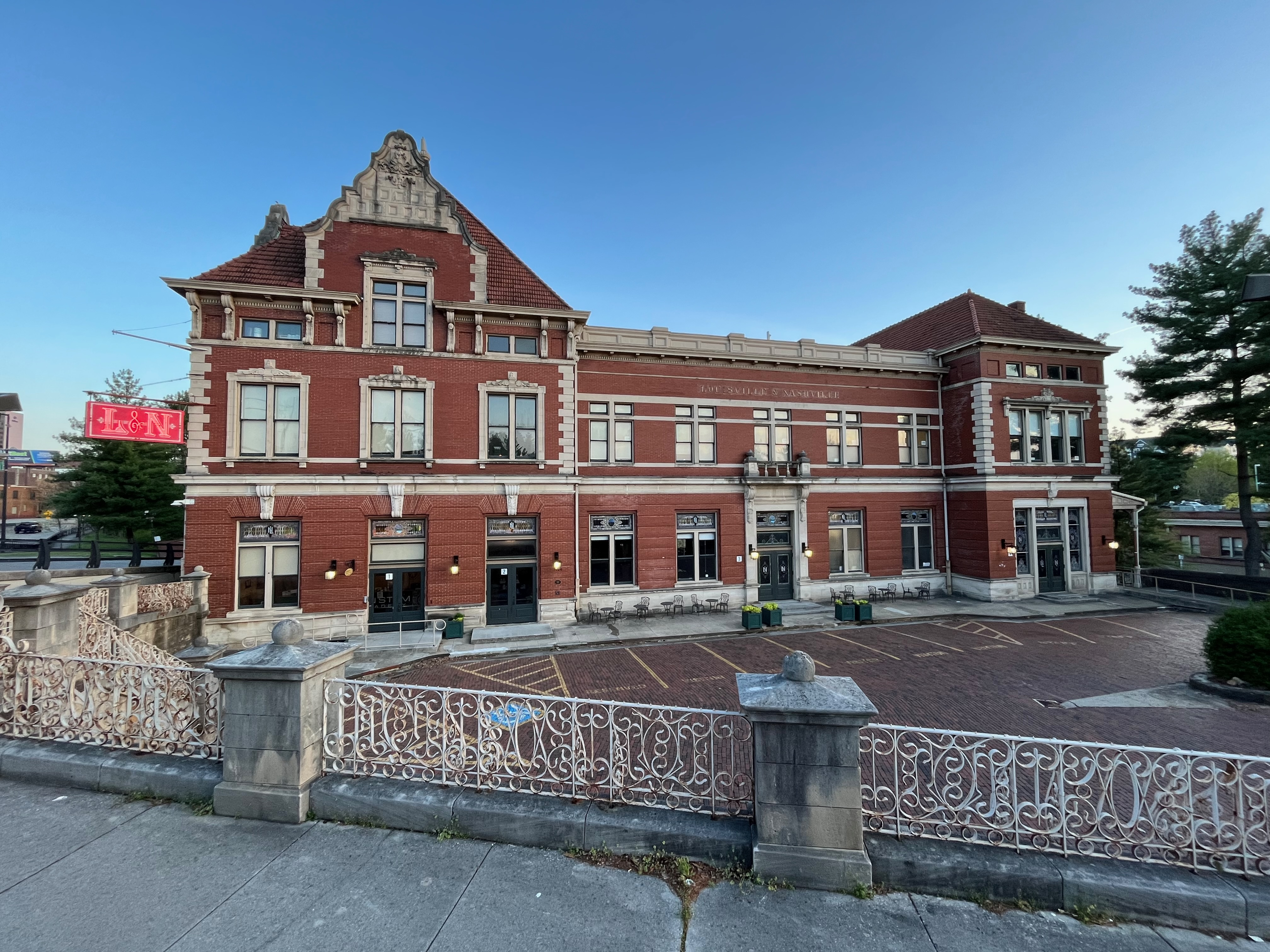
- The station building in 2025
- Location: 800 Worlds Fair Park Drive; Knoxville, Tennessee
- Coordinates: 35°57′51″N 83°55′28″W
- Area: 1.286 acres (5,200 m^{2})
- Built: 1904–1905
- Architect: Richard Monfort
- Architectural style: Victorian, Chateauesque
- NRHP reference No.: 82003982
- Added to NRHP: March 25, 1982

The L&N Station is a former rail passenger station in Knoxville, Tennessee, United States, located in the downtown area at the northern end of the World's Fair Park. Built in 1905 by the Louisville and Nashville Railroad and designed by its chief engineer, Richard Montfort, the station was renovated for use in the 1982 World's Fair, and is currently home to Knox County's STEM-based magnet high school, the L&N STEM Academy. In 1982, the building was added to the National Register of Historic Places for its architecture and role in Knoxville's transportation history.

The L&N completed a rail line running from Cincinnati to Atlanta in the early 1900s, and built a string of passenger stations and depots to service trains along this line. The company's Knoxville station was the city's largest, and considered by some the "finest" along the L&N's entire Cincinnati–Atlanta line. It served as a passenger station until the L&N ceased passenger train service to Knoxville in 1968, and continued to house L&N offices until 1975. The L&N Station is mentioned in several scenes in author James Agee's Pulitzer Prize-winning novel, A Death in the Family. The L&N Station is now home to the L&N STEM Academy, a magnet high school which focuses on science, technology, engineering, and math.

== Design ==
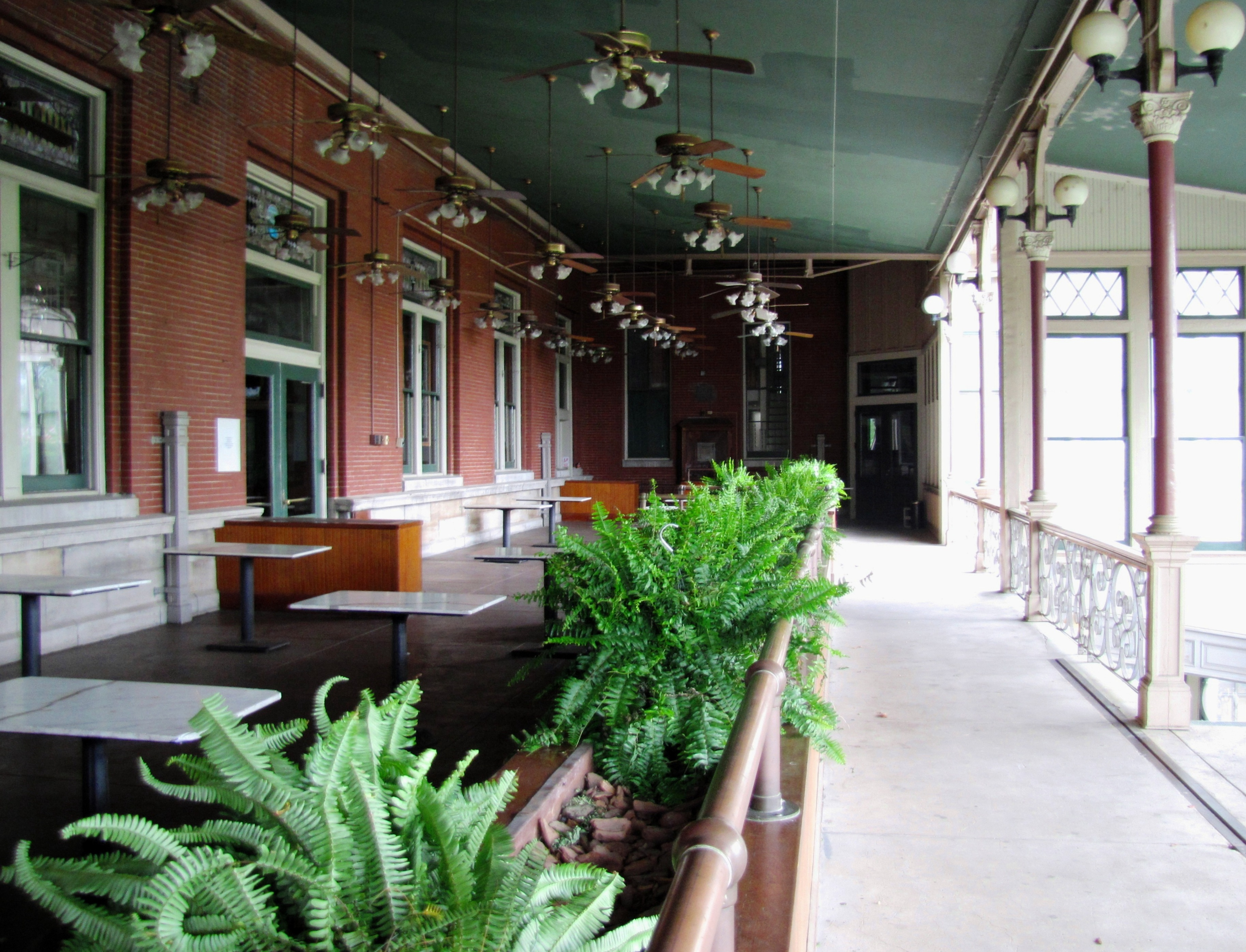
The station's rear veranda in 2010

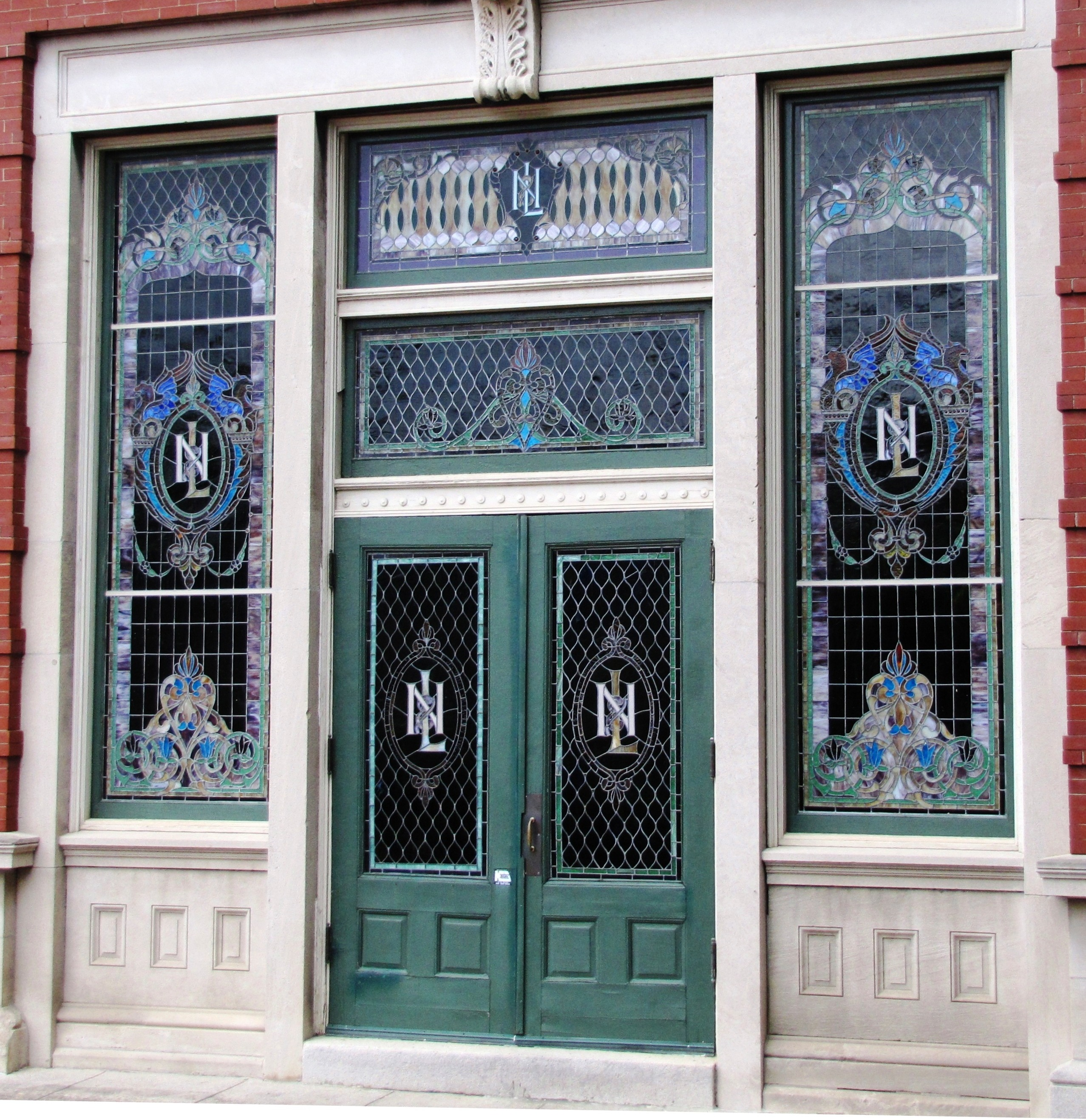
Stained glass windows at the station's northwest entrance in 2010

The L&N Station occupies the southwest corner of the intersection of Western Avenue, Broadway, Henley Street, and Summit Hill Drive, opposite Old City Hall. It straddles the east bank of Second Creek, and was designed to incorporate the bank's downward slope. The building is L-shaped, with wings projecting west and south of the northeast corner tower (the wings face Western Avenue and Henley Street). Due to the ground's slope, the building's main floor is at ground level on the north and east sides, but rises a full story above the ground on the south and west sides. Tracks and train sheds originally extended from the rail yard up to the rear of the building.

The building's most recognizable feature is its northeast corner tower, which rises three stories, and is topped by a pitched, clay-tiled roof with decorated dormers. A smaller tower rises at the end of the west wing, giving the building its chateau-like appearance. A wrap-around veranda allows access to the main floor on the south side of the building. The north side of the west wing originally included frosted glass doors and glazed transoms, which have been restored. Due to the construction of the Western Avenue Viaduct, the building's ground level lies about 10 feet (3.0 m) below Western Avenue, with a ramp providing vehicular access.

The interior of the main floor consisted of waiting rooms in the west wing, a dining room in the northeast corner tower, and a kitchen, lunch counter, and baggage areas in the south wing. The waiting rooms included a general waiting room, a ladies' waiting room (with a private entrance and an entrance from the general waiting room) on the northwest corner, and a "colored" waiting room on the southwest corner. The colored waiting room, a relic of segregation, had a separate entrance. The second story consisted of L&N offices, and the third story in the northeast tower was used as a drafting room by L&N engineers.

== History ==
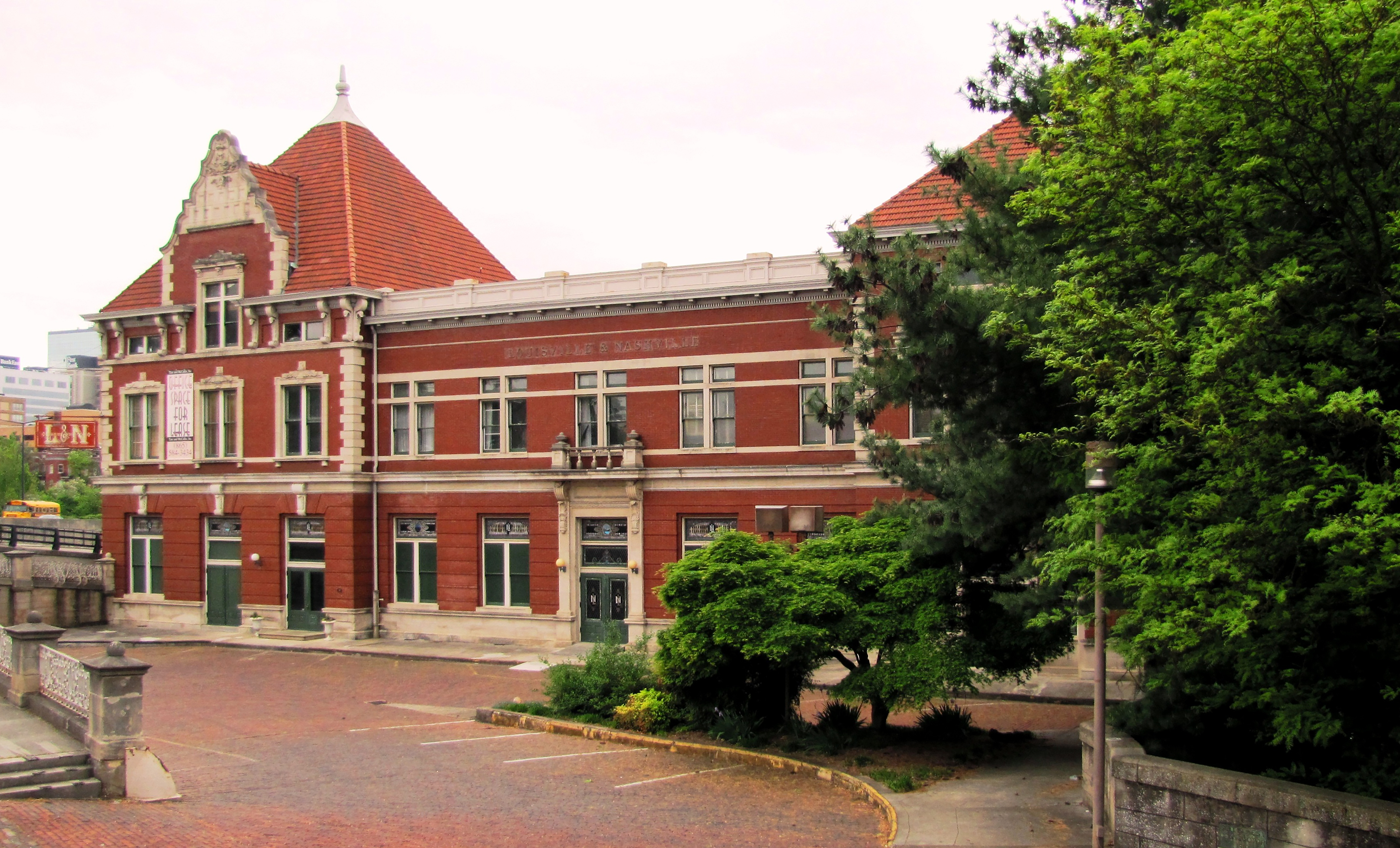
The L&N Station in 2010, viewed from Western Avenue

While railroads had reached Knoxville by 1855, the L&N did not have direct access to the city until the early 1900s, due to its rivalry with the Southern Railway and its predecessors. The Southern controlled much of the rail traffic south of the Tennessee-Kentucky border, while the L&N controlled much of the traffic north of the border, and the two railroads continuously thwarted one another's attempts to expand beyond this border. In an 1894 meeting, L&N president Milton Smith and Southern president Samuel Spencer agreed not to encroach upon each other's market.

Shortly after the 1894 agreement, Spencer was named president of the Cincinnati, New Orleans and Texas Pacific Railway, essentially giving the Southern (of which Spencer remained president) access to the L&N's Kentucky and Ohio markets. Deeming the agreement void, the L&N made plans to build a direct line from Cincinnati to Atlanta by way of Knoxville. In 1902, the L&N purchased the Atlanta, Knoxville and Northern Railroad, which connected Knoxville to the Western and Atlantic at Marietta, Georgia, and began construction of a line from Jellico to Knoxville, which was completed in 1905.

The L&N planned an elegant Knoxville station to rival the Southern Terminal, which had been erected at the Southern railyard along Depot Street. The L&N completed a freight depot in 1904, and began construction of the passenger station that same year. The station was designed by the L&N Engineering Department, headed by Irish immigrant and Royal College of Science for Ireland graduate Richard Monfort, who was largely responsible for the station's Victorian and chateauesque elements. The station formally opened on April 10, 1905.

Author James Agee describes the L&N Station in several scenes in his book, A Death In the Family, which is set in Knoxville in 1915. In an early scene, while walking through Knoxville with his father, they pass the station, and Agee noted how its stained glass "smouldered like an exhausted butterfly." In another scene, while crossing the Asylum (Western) Avenue Viaduct, he wrote, "the L&N yards lay on his left, feint skeins of steel, blocked shadows, little spumes of steam." In a later scene, Agee describes the crowded L&N waiting room, in which his family waited to catch a train to the Great Smoky Mountains.

=== Named passenger trains serving the station ===
Several passenger trains made stops at the station, including the following:

- Flamingo - Cincinnati - Jacksonville, Florida
- Southland - a pooled train from Chicago, through Cincinnati to St. Petersburg, Florida, a joint operation of the Pennsylvania Railroad, the L&N, Central of Georgia and the Atlantic Coast Line Railroad.

=== Post-L&N development ===
The L&N gradually phased out passenger service after World War II, with the last passenger train, the Flamingo, leaving the L&N Station in 1968. The L&N vacated the station in 1975, after which it remained vacant until purchased by Alex Harkness and his partners in 1980. In 1982, the station was renovated for use in the 1982 World's Fair, as it was adjacent to the World's Fair Park, which was then under development. Two restaurants, a Ruby Tuesday restaurant and the first L&N Seafood Grill, were housed in lower floors of the building, while the second floor offices were converted into meeting rooms for the fair's VIPs.

In 1985, the building was further renovated by Alex Harkness and Station 82 Partners for use as office space and special events. From 2002 to 2004, a restaurant, Ye Olde Steakhouse, operated out of the station while it repaired damage from a fire at its location on Chapman Highway.

=== L&N STEM Academy ===
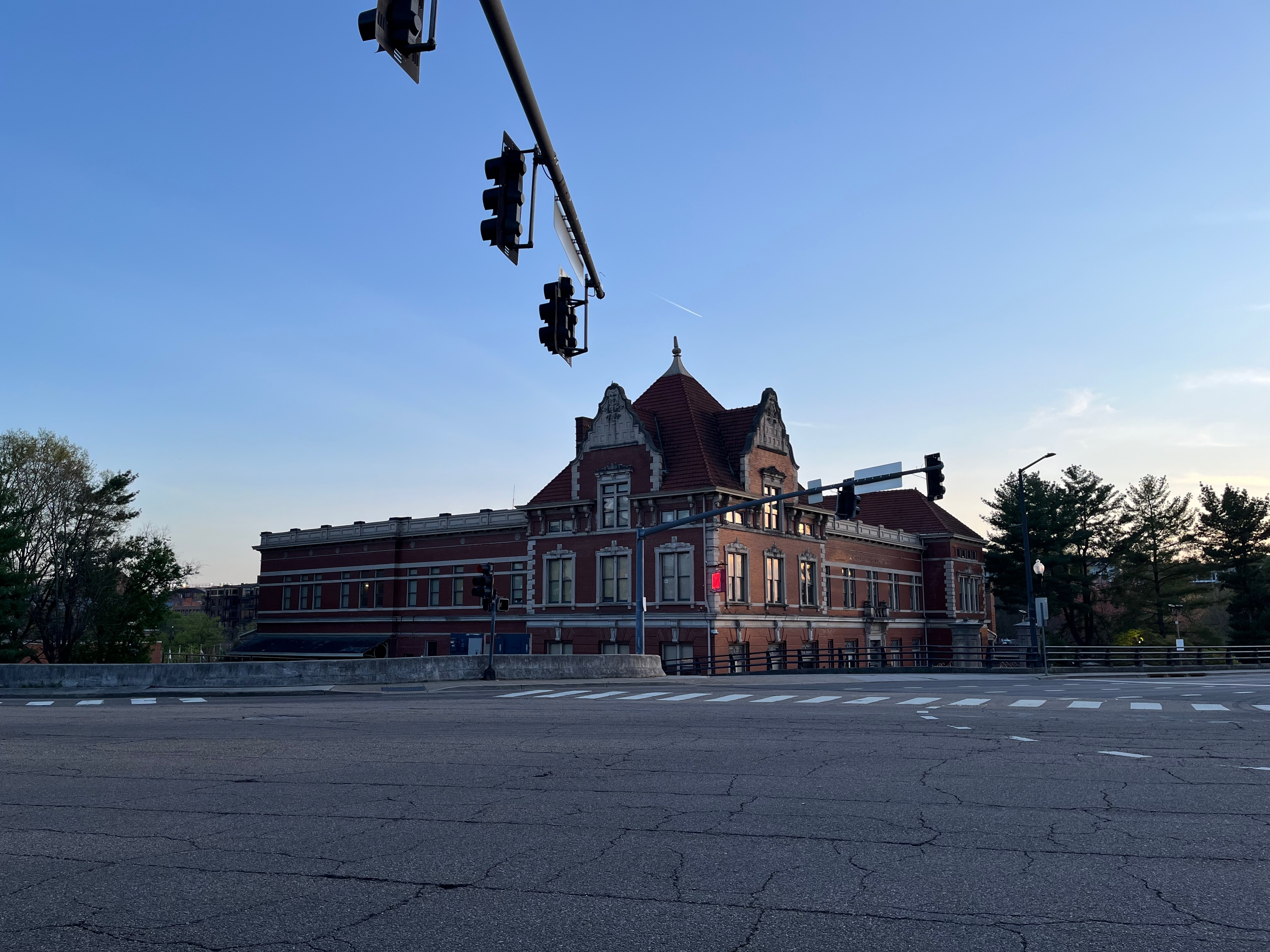
The station building in 2025

In October 2010, Knox County Schools announced plans to establish a magnet high school for science, technology, engineering, and mathematics (STEM), to be located in the L&N Station building. Funding for the STEM school is included in the Tennessee Race to the Top plan. $2 million was provided to the school through the Race to the Top funding. The idea for the L&N STEM Academy began with the district's strategic plan from 2009 that aimed for a "high quality, stand-alone technology high school." While applying for the Race to the Top funding, two plans for the L&N STEM Academy were merged; plans for a school to focus on science, math, and engineering and a plan for a STEM platform school were merged. To receive the funding from Race to the Top, the school had to meet the following requirements: "enrollment has to be open for any students who show the motivation to study in that environment and sharpen their skills, the school must be willing to try new things and officials must share with their neighbors their successes and failures." In January 2011, Becky Ashe was appointed principal of the school and also the coordinator of STEM education for Knox County Schools. At the same time, the L&N station was officially chosen as the site for the school.

The new school officially opened on August 15, 2011, with an enrollment of 180 students. The school began with just a freshman class, a sophomore class, 8 full-time teachers, and 4 part-time teachers. It cost $5.6 million to open the school with the money being used for renovations of the building, upgrades, and technology equipment. Students were still required to meet the academic standards presented by Knox County Schools but the material was delivered through the use of iPads, block scheduling, and cross planning through departments. Students were also required to take a STEM class, which is a project based learning course. The school partners with over 215 business and organizations.

The community was asked to help give the school its permanent name. The community gave suggestions to the school board who finalized the name. Over 95 suggestions were given by the community. In October 2011, the students and faculty of the school selected a gryphon to be the school mascot. Gryphons can be seen in the stained glass windows at the school.

The L&N STEM Academy partnered with the YMCA for the physical education program at the school. The students are able to work out at the YMCA's downtown Knoxville location during their PE class. The students walk over to the YMCA, do a homework assignment, and then are able to work out at the YMCA facilities during the remainder of time for class.

In December 2011, Tennessee governor Bill Haslam visited the school and talked with six students and two teachers. The Haslam family provided many contributions to the school and a space, the Haslam Commons, in the school was named after the family.

At the end of its first year of operation, the school ranked first and second in state tests for Algebra 1 and 2 and English 1 and 2. In the second year of operation, 187 students were added to the rosters: 150 freshmen, twenty sophomores, and six juniors. Eight teachers were added to the staff to bring the total to 20 teachers. Six students returned to their zoned high school.

In late 2012, the L&N STEM Academy began to allow students from eight surrounding counties to apply to attend the school. Thirty students were admitted to the school from the eight counties of Anderson, Blount, Grainger, Jefferson, Loudon, Roane, Sevier and Union for the 2013–2014 school year. The only restriction to the students who apply from out of county are that they have to be incoming freshmen and be interested in problem solving and critical thinking.

In 2013, the school was recognized as an Apple Distinguished school for the 2012–2013 school year. It was given the award for the school's "successes in enhancing and extending teaching and learning with the implementation of technology." For AP test scores, students scored in the top percentile for scoring threes or above. The school is also at the top of Knox County Schools in proficient and advanced scores in English classes 1, 2, and 3.

In September 2013, former L&N STEM Academy student Jessica Rainwater alleged that the school helped her cheat to allow her to gain credit for a course she was taking. She alleges that "she was given her three prior tests to use while taking a history 'End of Course' test a fourth time." Knox County School officials say that she did not cheat because that was standard procedure at the time she was taking the class. It was a county created test, not a state end of course exam, and it did not count towards her final grade.

A group of students won a national contest presented by the National Center for Earth and Space Science Education that allowed them to send a science experiment into space. They had to design a project that was related to microgravity and used multi-chambered tubes. The students wanted to find "an economically friendly way of trying to get rid of bodily wastes in space rather than bringing them back home." The experiment was used to see how cornstarch reacts with RID-X. The students spent 60 hours working on the experiment. The experiment was scheduled to launch on October 21, 2014, in Wallops Island, Virginia. Due to a boat being within 20 miles of the launch site on October 21, the launch was postponed until the next day. The rocket exploded 15 seconds after takeoff. The experiment was relaunched on a second rocket on December 9, 2014, from Cape Canaveral. NanoRacks was able to find the necessary $21,500 to rebuild the experiment for the second takeoff.

In May 2014, the school graduated its first class. Forty-two students were the total number of the first graduating class for the school.

In August 2014, The L&N STEM Academy was placed on the Reward schools list for Tennessee by the state Department of Education. The L&N was placed in the top 5% and recognized for its performance.

In May 2015, the first class, made up of just over 100 students, to attend the school all four years of its existence graduated. The class was awarded $3.1 million in scholarship money in total and which averaged to around $31,000 per student.

In August 2015, a University of Tennessee at Knoxville student broke into the school and fell from a third floor window, about 40 ft from the ground. He had non-life-threatening injuries and was believed to be drunk at the time.

Preceding station	Louisville and Nashville Railroad	Following station
Willoughby toward Cincinnati	Cincinnati – Atlanta	Welwyn toward Atlanta
