= List of reporting marks: F =

Note: Marks ending in U are for container owners; marks ending in X are not common carriers; marks ending in Z are for trailers without flanged wheels. All other marks are of common-carrier railroads.

== F ==
- FAIX - FAIX Leasing
- FALX - Falk Corporation
- FANU - Brenner Tank, Inc.
- FAPR - Floydada and Plainview Railroad
- FARX - Farmers Cooperative Company (of Cleghorn, Iowa)
- FBAU - Ahlers Lines NV
- FBDC - Ford County Historical Railroad Preservation Foundation
- FBFU - Marine Transworld Equipment Corporation
- FBMU - Cie Maritime Belge, SA
- FBMX - Fayblock Materials
- FBOX - Trailer Train Company, TTX Company
- FBSU - Franco Belgian Services
- FBZU - China Ocean Shipping Company
- FC - Fulton County Railroad
- FCCM - Compania de Ferrocarriles Chiapas Mayab, S.A. de C.V.
- FCCX - Farmers Cooperative Company, Finova Capital Corporation
- FCDN - Ferrocarril de Nacozari
- FCEN - Florida Central Railroad
- FCEX - Farmers Union Central Exchange
- FCIN - Frankfort and Cincinnati Railroad
- FCM - Ferrocarril Mexicano
- FCP - Ferrocarril del Pacifico
- FCR - Fulton County Railway
- FCRD - First Coast Railroad
- FCRK - Falls Creek Railroad
- FCTX - Farmers' Commodities Transportation
- FDDM - Fort Dodge, Des Moines and Southern Railway, Chicago and North Western Railway, Union Pacific Railroad
- FDMA - Ferrocarril de Minatitlan al Carmen
- FDSU - Foodsource, Inc.
- FDSZ - Foodsource, Inc.
- FEC - Florida East Coast Railway
- FECU - Yamashita-Shinnihon Line
- FECZ - Florida East Coast Railway
- FEIX - Farmers Elevator, Inc.
- FEMX - Freight Equipment Management Company
- FEPX - FirstEnergy Corp
- FEXZ - Florida Express Carriers, Inc.
- FFEZ - Frozen Food Express
- FFFZ - Flexi-Van Leasing, Inc.
- FFIX - Procor, Ltd.
- FFTX - Fun Trains, Inc. (operators of the Florida Fun Train)
- FGA - Florida Gulf and Atlantic Railroad
- FGCX - Florida Gulf Coast Railroad Museum
- FGER - Fruit Growers Express
- FGEX - Fruit Growers Express
- FGGX - Farmers Grain Cooperative
- FGLK - Finger Lakes Railway
- FGLX - Factor Gas Liquids, Inc.
- FGMR - Fruit Growers Express
- FGTX - Florida Gas Terminals, Inc.
- FGWX - Federal Grain Inspection Service (USDA)
- FHRX - Flint Hills Resources
- FILX - Wellman, Inc.
- FIMX - Franklin Industrial Minerals
- FINU - Interpool, Ltd.
- FINX - Finley Company, Inc.; Trinity Rail Management; Total Petrochemicals USA
- FIR - Flats Industrial Railroad
- FIT - Ferrocarril del Istmo de Tehuantepec, S.A. de C.V.
- FISZ - Ecorail, Inc.
- FJG - Fonda, Johnstown and Gloversville Railroad
- FJLX - Big West Oil Company
- FL - Family Lines System
- FLAX - Flexsys America
- FLAZ - Flexi-Van Leasing
- FLCX - Flex Leasing Corporation
- FLDX - DTE Transportation Services, Inc.
- FLEX - RailLease, Inc.
- FLGZ - Flexi-Van Leasing
- FLIX - Farmland Industries, Inc.
- FLJX - Big West Oil Company
- FLNX - R. P. Flynn, Inc., Ohio Railway Supply
- FLOX - Flex Leasing Company
- FLRX - ADM Milling Company
- FLSX - Great Miami, Inc.
- FLT - Foss Launch and Tug
- FLTZ - Flexi-Van Leasing
- FLXU - Flexi-Van Leasing
- FLXZ - Flexi-Van Leasing
- FMCU - FMC Corporation (Industrial Chemical Group)
- FMGU - Flota Mercante Grancolombiana, SA
- FMID - Florida Midland Railroad
- FMIX - CCKX, Inc.
- FMLX - FMC Corporation (Inorganic Chemicals Division)
- FMOX - FMC Corporation (Inorganic Chemicals Division)
- FMRC - Farmrail Corporation
- FNAX - Ferrellgas LLP
- FNE - Transportación Ferroviaria Mexicana; Kansas City Southern de México
- FNM - Ferrocarriles Nacionales de Mexico
- FNOR - Florida Northern Railroad
- FOR - Fore River Railroad
- FORZ - Flexi-Van Leasing
- FP - Fordyce and Princeton Railroad
- FPAX - Formosa Plastics Corporation, Formosa Transrail Corporation
- FPBX - Federal Paper Board Company, International Paper Corporation
- FPCX - Occidental Chemical Corporation (PVC resins), Oxy Vinyls LP
- FPN - Ferrocarriles Nacionales de Mexico
- FPPX - Fayette Power Project
- FPXZ - Flexi-Van Leasing
- FRDN - Ferdinand Railroad, H and S Railroad
- FREU - ABS Industrial Verification, Inc.
- FRLU - Farrell Lines, Inc.
- FRR - Falls Road Railroad
- FRRX - Feather River Rail Society
- FRSU - China Ocean Shipping Company
- FRTX - Frit Transportation, Inc., Farm-City Transport, Inc.
- FRV - Fox River Valley Railroad; Wisconsin Central
- FRVR - Fox Valley and Western
- FSCX - Frank Mitacek Railway Service
- FSFL - Burlington Northern and Santa Fe Railway; BNSF Railway
- FSHX - GE Rail Services
- FSIX - FSIX, Inc.
- FSR - Fort Smith Railroad
- FSRR - Ferrosur
- FST - Ferrocarriles Nacionales de Mexico
- FSTU - Fastrac Intermodal, LLC
- FSTX - Fuel Supply Trust
- FSTZ - Fastrac Intermodal, LLC
- FSUD - Fort Street Union Depot Company
- FSVB - Fort Smith and Van Buren Railway
- FTCU - Firsttank Corporation
- FTCX - Far Port Cooperative, Inc.
- FTIX - FTIX Associates
- FTMZ - Fruit Growers Express
- FTSX - Fairmont Tamper
- FTTX - Trailer Train Company, TTX Company
- FUCU - Shinko Pantec Company, Ltd.
- FURX - First Union Rail
- FUS - Ferrocarriles Unidos del Sureste, Ferrocarriles Nacionales de Mexico
- FVIU - Flexi-Van, Inc.
- FVIZ - Flexi-Van Leasing
- FVLZ - Venezuelan Line
- FVPZ - Flexi-Van Leasing
- FVRR - Fredonia Valley Railroad
- FVW - Fox Valley and Western
- FWAZ - Flexi-Van Leasing
- FWCR - Florida West Coast Railroad
- FWD - Fort Worth and Denver Railway, Chicago, Burlington and Quincy Railroad, Burlington Northern Railroad, Burlington Northern and Santa Fe Railway
- FWDB - Fort Worth and Dallas Belt Railroad
- FWDR - Fort Worth and Dallas Railroad
- FWIU - Trans Ocean, Ltd.
- FWLX - Foster Wheeler Ltd.
- FWRY - Fillmore and Western Railway
- FWTX - American Railcar Leasing, LLC - SMBC Rail Services LLC
- FWTZ - Flexi-Van Leasing
- FWU - Fort Wayne Union
- FWWR - Fort Worth and Western Railroad
- FXE - Ferromex
