= Perry Cutoff =

Historic railroad in Florida

Overview
- Other name(s): Thomasville—Dunnellon Line, Perry Subdivision
- Status: Abandoned
- Owner: Atlantic Coast Line Railroad

Technical
- Track gauge: 1,435 mm (4 ft 8 1/2 in) standard gauge
Route map
Interactive map of the Perry Cutoff (red) and associated lines (dark red)

The Atlantic Coast Line Railroad's Perry Cutoff (which was part of the company's Thomasville—Dunnellon Line) was a historic rail line in northern Florida running from Monticello southeast to Perry. The line provided a shortcut through the Big Bend of Florida for rail traffic running between the Midwest and the Tampa Bay area by providing a more direct route and a bypass for the busy rail hub in Jacksonville. It was completed in 1928 to reduce travel times for its passenger trains to the west coast, or Gulf Coast, of Florida during the Florida land boom of the 1920s.

== Route and history ==
The Perry Cutoff basically connected two pre-existing Atlantic Coast Line Railroad routes. Track to Monticello, which originated in Thomasville, Georgia, was built in 1888 as a branch of the Savannah, Florida and Western Railroad. The Savannah, Florida and Western Railroad was once the main line of the Plant System.

At the other end, track was built in 1907 by the Atlantic Coast Line from Newberry west to Wilcox and Perry. This was an extension of the Jacksonville and Southwestern Railroad, a railroad from Jacksonville to Newberry that the Atlantic Coast Line acquired in 1904. The Atlantic Coast Line additionally built a line from Dunnellon northwest to Wilcox in 1914 to connect with the Newberry to Perry Line.

Once the Perry Cutoff was in place in 1928, trains could travel from the midwest to Thomasville, Georgia and head south along Florida's Gulf Coast through Monticello, Perry, Wilcox, and Dunnellon to reach Tampa and St. Petersburg. The line allowed for trains to travel up to 59 miles per hour. Most notably, the Louisville & Nashville's and ACL's Southland was shifted over to this direct route in 1928. The Line crossed the Seaboard Air Line Railroad's Jacksonville to Tallahassee line in Drifton. It also connected with the Live Oak, Perry, and Gulf Railroad in Perry, which the Atlantic Coast Line owned until 1928 (the year the Perry Cutoff was complete) when it was sold to the Brooks-Scanlon Lumber Company, who would eventually sell it to Norfolk Southern. Once the Perry Cutoff was in place, the full line from Thomasville to Dunnellon was designated on employee timetables as the Thomasville–Dunnellon Line (ND Line). The Southland was discontinued in 1957.

The Atlantic Coast Line became the Seaboard Coast Line Railroad in 1967. The Seaboard Coast Line continued to operate the full line from Thomasville to Dunnellon as the Perry Subdivision. In 1980, the Seaboard Coast Line's parent company merged with the Chessie System, creating the CSX Corporation. The CSX Corporation initially operated the Chessie and Seaboard Systems separately until 1986, when they were merged into CSX Transportation.

== Remnants ==
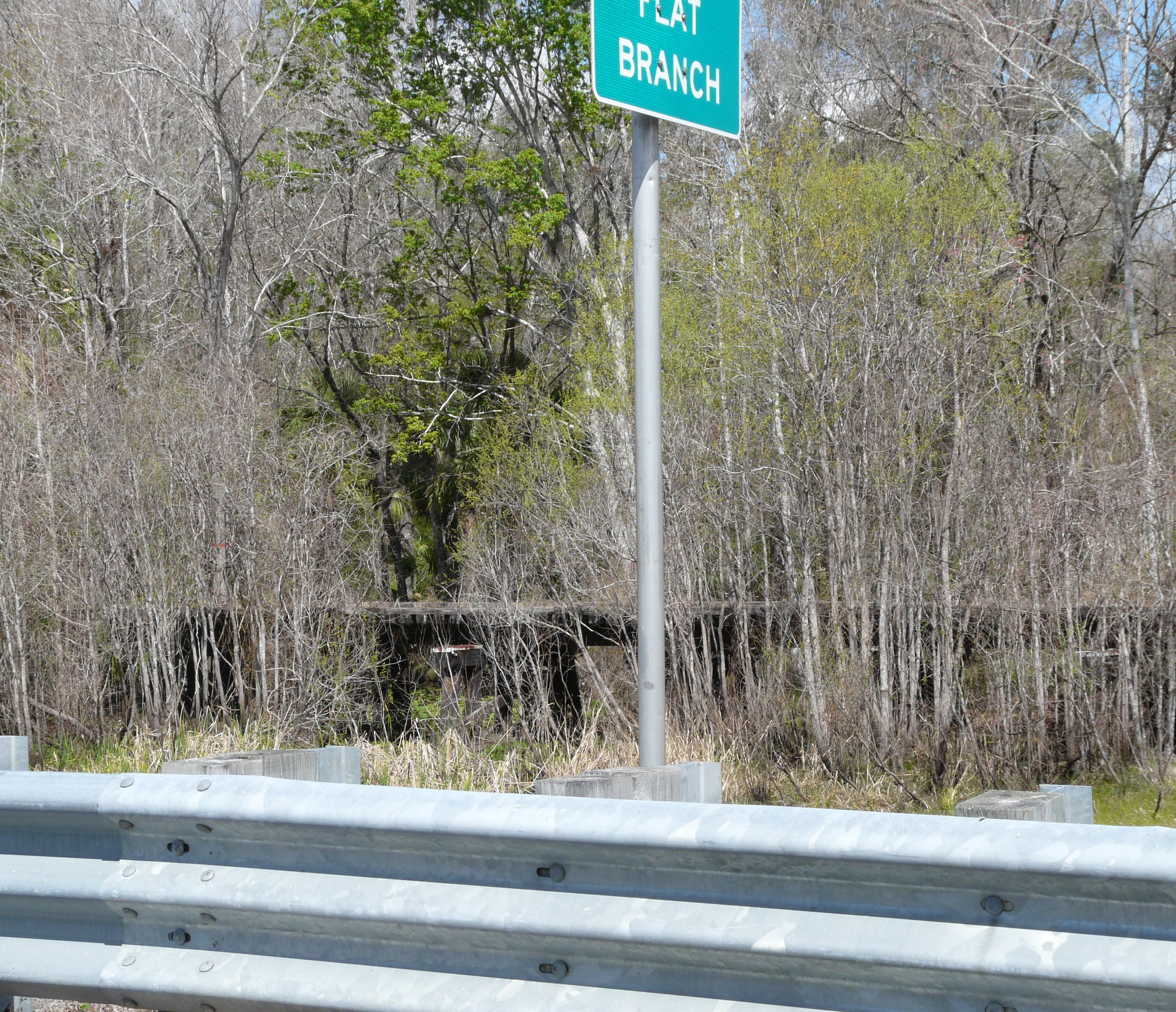
Old trestle bridge on the route in Levy County, Florida

Most of the Perry Cutoff north of Cross City was removed by the mid-1980s along with track from Dunnellon to Chiefland. Remaining track from Newberry to Cross City, and from Wilcox to Chiefland was then leased to the Florida West Coast Railroad, a shortline, in 1987. The Florida West Coast Railroad slowly abandoned more of the track until 2010, when the last track west of Newberry was abandoned. The Nature Coast State Trail now runs on some of the former right of way.

The only track that is still active is what is now CSX's Metcalf Spur from Thomasville to Metcalf (part of the former Monticello Branch).

== Historic stations ==
Thomasville to Dunnellon

State	Milepost	City/Location	Station	Opening date	Connections and notes
GA	AND 691.6	Thomasville	Thomasville	1888	junction with Atlantic Coast Line Railroad Waycross—Montgomery Line
GA	AND 701.5	Metcalfe	Metcalfe	1888	
FL	AND 704.2		Fincher	1888	
FL	AND 710.7		Alma	1888	
FL	AND 714.7	Monticello	Monticello	1888	junction with Florida Central and Western Railroad Monticello Branch (FC&P/SAL)
FL	AND 719.1	Drifton	Drifton	1928	junction with Seaboard Air Line Railroad Tallahassee Subdivision
FL	AND 728.6	Lamont	Lamont	1928	
FL	AND 734.8	Eridu	Eridu	1928	
FL		Iddo	Iddo	1928	
FL	AND 745.6		Secotan	1928	
FL	AND 750.6	Perry	Perry	1909	junction with Live Oak, Perry & Gulf Railroad
FL	AND 757.0		Pinland	1909	
FL	AND 761.4		Athena	1909	
FL	AND 767.6	Carbur	Carbur	1909	
FL		Salem	Salem	1909	
FL			Benotis	1909	
FL	AND 778.3	Clara	Clara	1909	
FL	AND 784.4	Hines	Hines	1909	
FL	AND 794.5	Cross City	Cross City	1909	
FL		Eugene	Eugene	1909	
FL	AND 804.4	Old Town	Old Town	1909	
FL	AND 806.1	Wilcox	Wilcox	1909	junction with Atlantic Coast Line Railroad Jacksonville–Wilcox Line
FL	AND 814.1		Hardeetown	1914	
FL	AND 816.9	Chiefland	Chiefland	1914	
FL		Usher	Usher	1914	
FL	AND 830.2	Otter Creek	Otter Creek	1914	junction with Seaboard Air Line Railroad Cedar Key Subdivision
FL	AND 835.8	Gulf Hammock	Gulf Hammock	1914	previously known as Gunntown; Junction with the Patrick and McInnis Sawmill Railroad
FL	AND 842.1		Lebanon	1914	
FL			Tidewater	1914	
FL	AND 848.7		Steen	1914	
FL	AND 857.4	Dunnellon	Dunnellon	1914	junction with Atlantic Coast Line Railroad High Springs—Lakeland Line

== See also ==
- High Springs—Lakeland Line
- Jacksonville and Southwestern Railroad
