= Florida West Coast Railroad =

Shortline railroad operating in the west coast of florida

Overview
- Headquarters: Trenton, Florida
- Reporting mark: FWCR
- Locale: west of Gainesville, Florida
- Dates of operation: 1987–2010

Technical
- Track gauge: 4 ft 8 1/2 in (1,435 mm) standard gauge

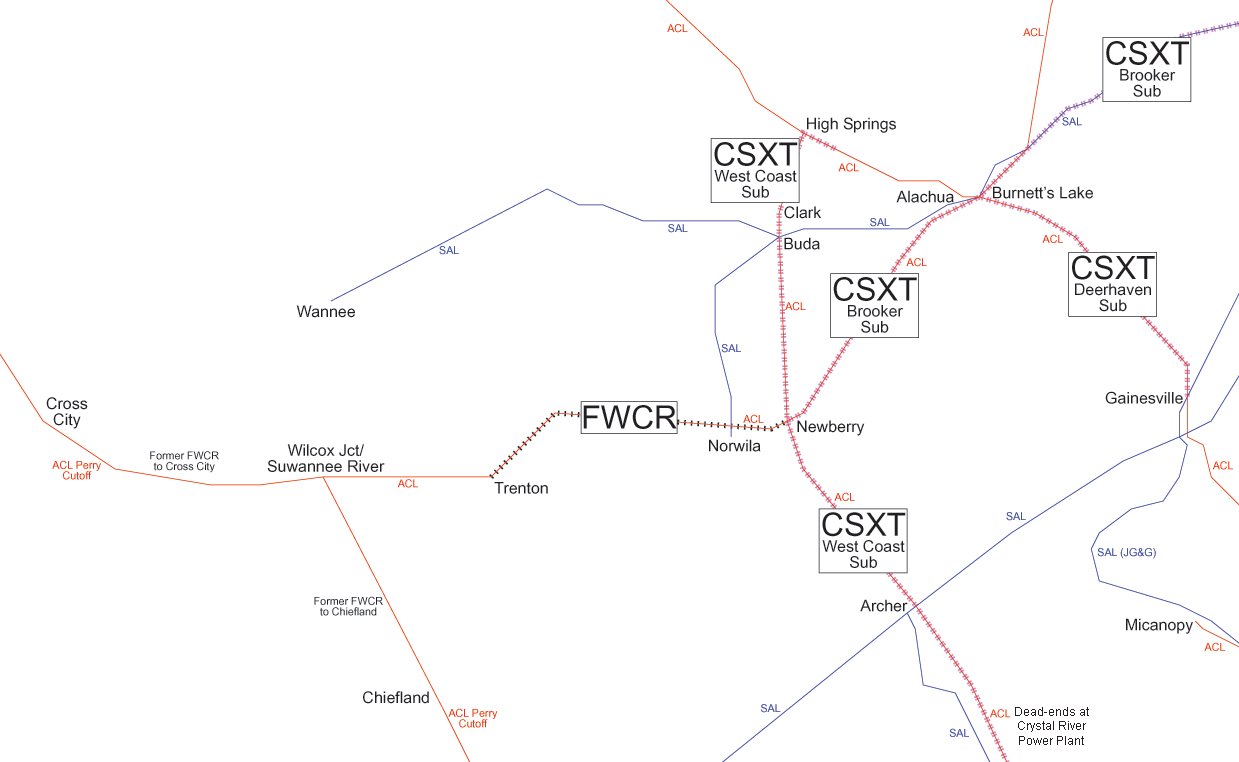
A map of the Florida West Coast Railroad and connections, with former railroads shown.

The Florida West Coast Railroad (reporting mark FWCR) was a 13-mile (21-kilometre) railroad owned by CSF Acquisition, Inc., which acquired it from CSX on December 13, 1987 as its first acquisition. It ran west from a CSX line at Newberry to Trenton.

The railroad used to extend west to Cross City, with a branch south to Chiefland. All the lines were originally owned by the Atlantic Coast Line Railroad.

On February 25, 2004, the company applied to the Surface Transportation Board to abandon almost the whole line. The case was decided March 11, 2004, and the company was allowed to abandon all of the line.

By notice to the STB on May 13, 2010, Florida West Coast Railroad abandoned 10.3 miles of the railroad from Newberry to Trenton. The consummation of abandonment did not include the easternmost portion of the railroad. The portion that was abandoned was subsequently acquired by the State of Florida Department of Environmental Protection to be used to extend the Nature Coast State Trail.

== See also ==
- Perry Cutoff
- List of United States railroads
- List of Florida railroads
