= Richard Montfort =

Irish-American engineer and architect

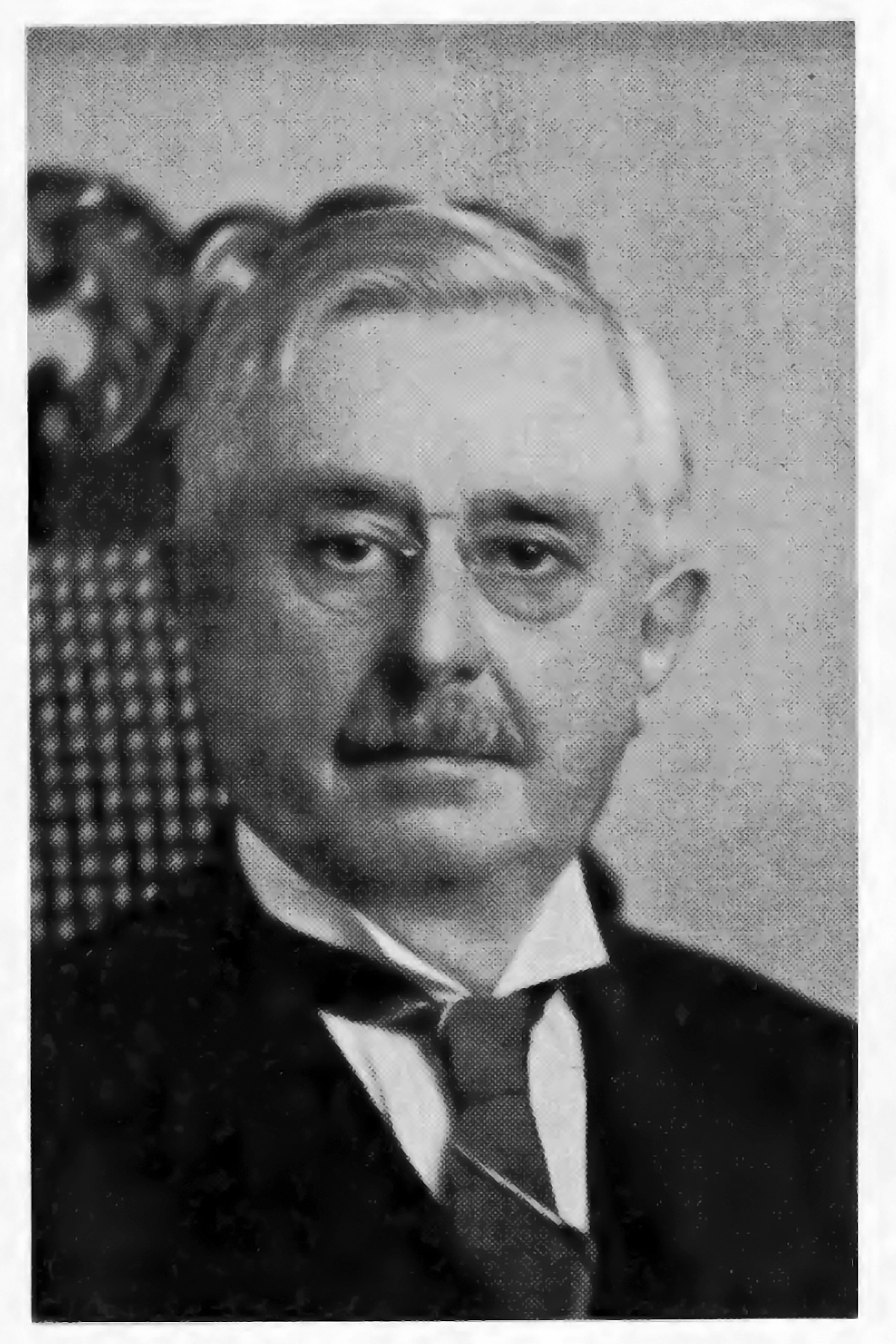
Richard Montfort, first chief engineer of the Louisville & Nashville Railroad.

Richard Montfort (County Carlow, Ireland, 4 March 1854 – 7 February 1931, Atlantic City, New Jersey, United States), was an Irish-American architect and engineer. He served as the first chief engineer of the Louisville & Nashville Railroad from 1887 to 1905, and in this capacity designed several of the L&N's most important structures, including Union Station in Nashville, Tennessee (1898–1900), and the L&N station in Knoxville (1904–05). He was one of the key persons to contribute to the L&N's growth over the last quarter of the nineteenth century and first quarter of the twentieth into one of the US's most robust corporations.

== Early life ==
Montfort was born in the 1850s in County Carlow, in southeastern Ireland, a highly agricultural area with virtually no industry. A Protestant in a heavily Catholic region, he attended the Kingstown School in what is now Dún Laoghaire, County Dublin, a suburb of the Irish capital, and then moved on to the relatively-new Royal College of Science in Dublin, where he received his training as an engineer and graduated in 1876.

After graduation he immigrated to Louisville, Kentucky, where he found work with the Louisville Bridge and Iron Company, rising successively over the next four years from draftsman, to inspector, and finally assistant engineer.

== L&N Employment ==
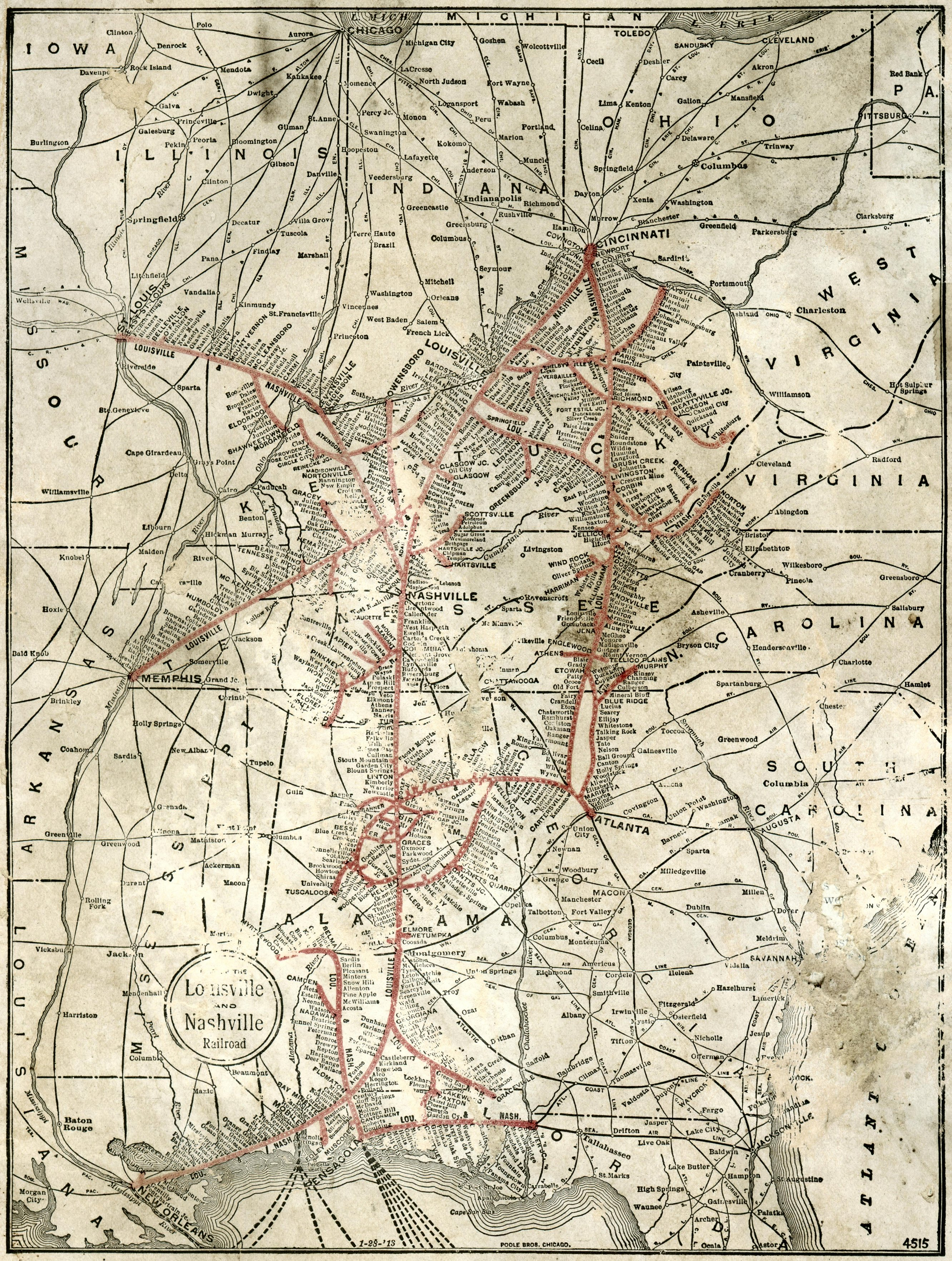
The Louisville & Nashville Railroad's network, 1913. Montfort was in charge of maintaining and upgrading all constructions over this geographic area.

In 1880 Montfort accepted the position of bridge engineer with the Louisville & Nashville Railroad (L&N), which, from its principal axis between its two titular rapidly-developing cities, was quickly becoming the preeminent railroad in the upper and mid-South of the US. During the Gilded Age, the L&N expanded and consolidated a vast network throughout Kentucky, Tennessee, and Alabama, with sections of track in North Carolina, Georgia, Mississippi, Louisiana, Florida, Virginia, Ohio, Illinois, and Indiana, often using predatory practices to squeeze or buy out smaller regional railroads, as was the norm in the industry before the Federal government began to implement serious regulation. Many through services from the midwestern cities of Chicago, Indianapolis, and St. Louis bound for Atlanta, Birmingham, Memphis, and Florida, including some of the famous named trains of American railroad lore, ran over its network and called at the L&N's prominent stations.

Within three years Montfort had become resident engineer of the entire L&N system, in charge of the roadway, bridges, and building departments. In 1887, at the age of 33, in recognition of his expertise, he was awarded the newly created title of chief engineer, in which capacity he served for the next seventeen years, responsible for the building and maintenance of nearly 5,000 miles of infrastructure. In addition to being a highly capable engineer, a vital asset to the L&N in an era of rapid expansion, Montfort was a knowledgeable if not particularly original architect. He was responsible for the design of the new Union Station in Nashville, which, along with the other great terminal Union Station in Louisville (built in 1890 to designs of F.W. Mobray), served as the twin architectural representations of the company's strength at the turn of the century. Though the two stations at Nashville and Knoxville are his key architectural works, it is conjectured that he must have designed many more lesser-known structures at the height of his career at the L&N.

=== Nashville Union Station ===
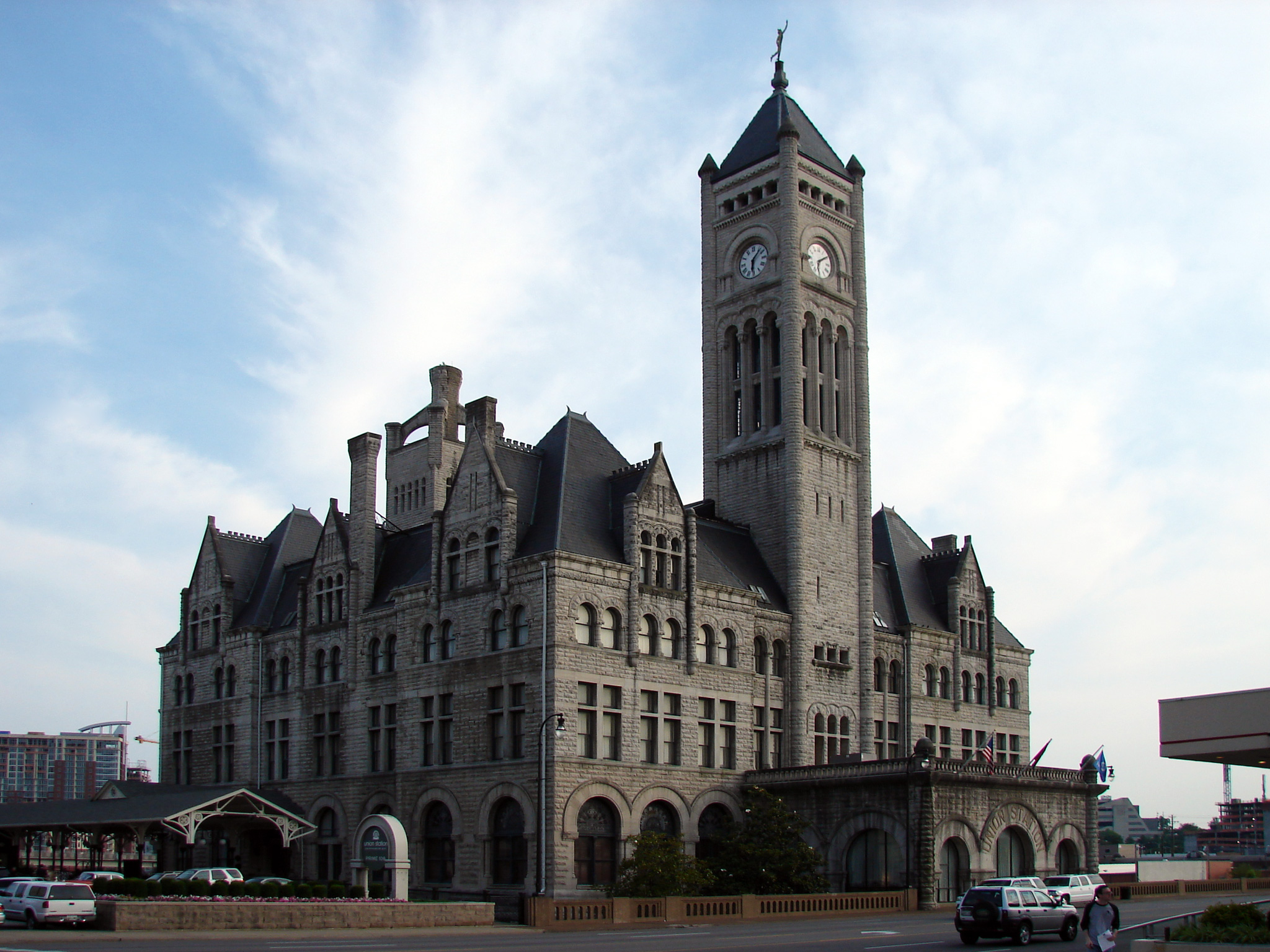
Union Station, Nashville, Tennessee, Montfort's most famous building.

Ground was broken for Nashville Union Station on 1 August 1898, and it was opened on 9 October 1900, in the year of the last great Paris World's Fair of the nineteenth century. Even though it no longer serves passenger traffic, it remains the greatest monument to Montfort, as "by his force, all plans and prints were prepared." Montfort designed the station in a very late (and somewhat out-of-fashion) Richardsonian-Romanesque style, with an exterior envelope of rusticated, irregular, almost unfinished stone and a high picturesque steep-gabled roof punctuated by dormers and crowned at the front entrance by a tall clock tower, itself capped by a statue of Mercury, the Roman god of commerce, transferred there from the commerce pavilion at the 1897 Tennessee Centennial and International Exposition. Supposedly Montfort was inspired by H.H. Richardson's last great work, the Allegheny County Courthouse in Pittsburgh, Pennsylvania, which uses a highly similar set of façades and front clock tower. The interior features a great main concourse and waiting room, encircled by gallery levels onto which offices of the L&N's higher-level employees opened. The interior bas-reliefs on either side of its prominent mezzanine clock were affectionately and appropriately called "Miss Louisville" and "Miss Nashville," and it once featured a pool in which alligators swam. Montfort spared no expense at luxury: the station building itself cost $350,000, the train shed another $200,000, and the freight terminal another $100,000—in all, the equivalent of some $19,800,000 in 2018.

Though often threatened with demolition between the 1960s and 1980s, when it was deemed only a matter of time before the wrecking balls would get it, the station remains one of the most important architectural landmarks of the late Victorian era in Nashville, and represented the city's rapid ascent to one of the leading metropolises in the New South that industrialised in the years after the American Civil War. The day of its inauguration in 1900 was marked by a parade that featured numerous bands, society ladies, Confederate veterans and horsemen, firemen, postmen, and a grand banquet among whom August Belmont, the banker and Chairman of the L&N's Board of Directors, was a distinguished guest. Union Station's importance was augmented with the addition in the 1930s of the city's main post office next door, making it also a vital link in the efficient regional distribution of mail.

After dwindling passenger service throughout the post-World War II era, Nashville Union Station's traffic was reduced to one daily train, the Floridian between Chicago and St. Petersburg, Florida upon Amtrak's takeover of the American passenger rail network on 1 May 1971, then was entirely abandoned with the termination of the service in 1979. It sat empty until 1986, when it was redeveloped into the luxurious Union Station Hotel, whose lobby occupies the spacious main concourse with guest rooms in the levels above. Developers struggled to find a use for Montfort's train shed, claimed to be the largest in the world at one point, and it was demolished in 2000 after being damaged by a fire in 1996; as a result, the station's designation as a National Historic Landmark was withdrawn in 2003.

=== L&N Station, Knoxville ===
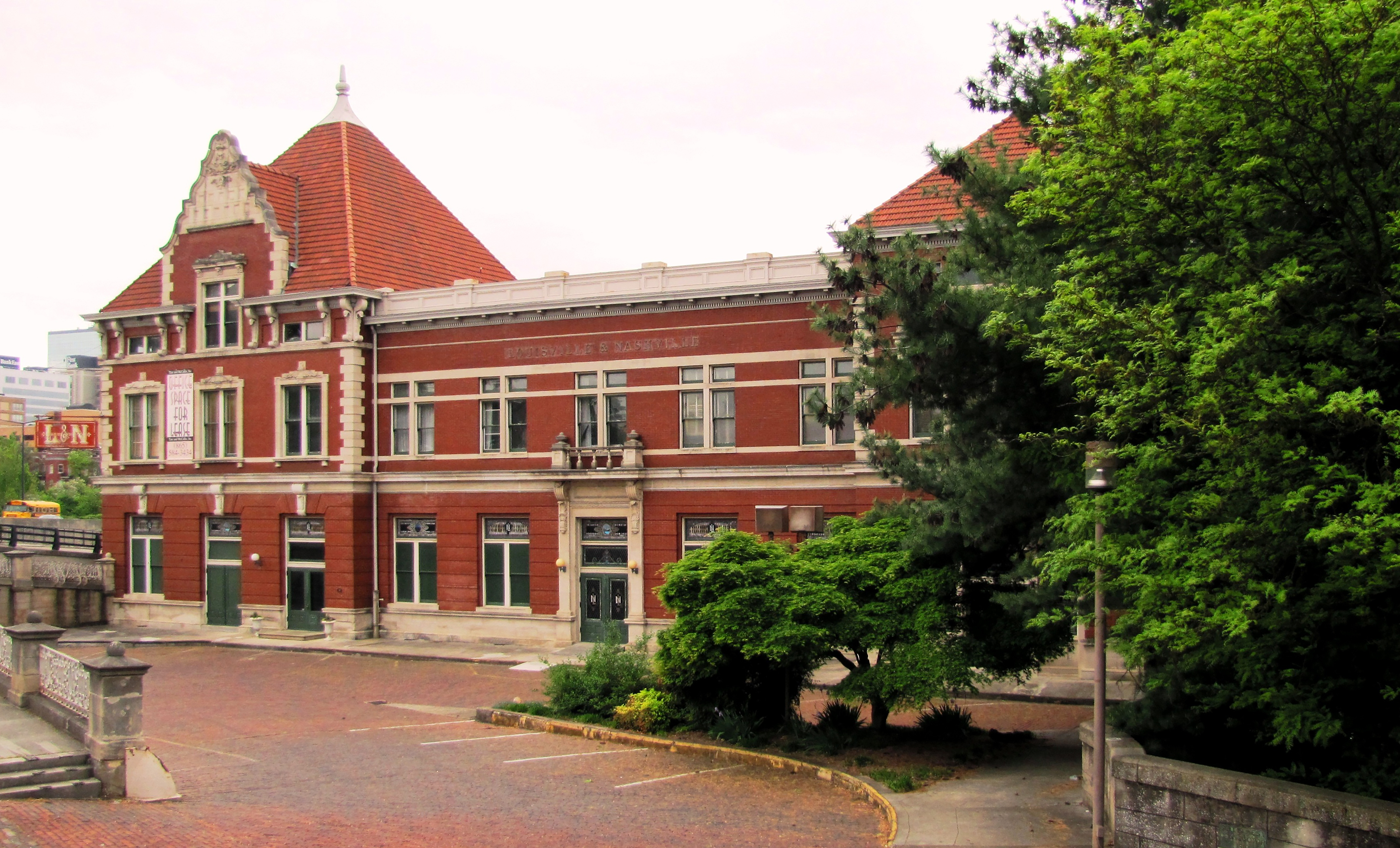
Montfort's other major railroad station, the L&N depot in Knoxville, now a magnet school for math and science.

Four years after the completion of the Nashville station, Montfort was employed to design another new L&N station in downtown Knoxville, Tennessee, the largest city in the eastern third of the state and a gateway to Appalachia. He designed a tile-roofed red-brick depot in a Chateauesque/Flemish-Renaissance-revival style whose headhouse served as the stub-end terminus for the L&N rail lines entering the city, meaning the trains had to decouple their locomotives and hook up to a different one at their opposite ends to enter and leave the station. Its construction was desired by the L&N after the completion of the Southern Railway's grand passenger and freight complex on the north side of downtown in 1903 by its noted house architect Frank Pierce Milburn. Opened on 10 April 1905, Montfort's station almost immediately became a regional landmark: James Agee described its "smouldering" stained glass and referenced it multiple times in his novel A Death in the Family, set in Knoxville in 1915. After the L&N abandoned all service to Knoxville in the 1960s, the vast rail yards behind the station were then redeveloped into what would become World's Fair Park, the site of the 1982 World's Fair. The station itself, which served as a restaurant during the event, has recently been converted (appropriately, given Montfort's engineering training) into a high-performing municipal math-and-science public magnet school.

Montfort must have been exhausted from his duties. On 1 January 1905 he stepped down from his post at his own request and was named consulting engineer, effectively retiring at the age of fifty. From that time on, his duties chiefly consisted of representing the railroad at meetings of the American Railway Engineering Association and sitting on the L&N's own Rail Committee.

== Personal life ==
Montfort married Miss Henri Barret (1861–1900) not long after his arrival in Louisville, with whom he had one son, Barret Montfort, who later became vice-president of the Chemical National Bank & Trust Company of New York.

Montfort was a member of several prominent organizations, including the Fourth Presbyterian Church in Louisville, the American Society of Civil Engineers, American Railway Engineering Association, and the Engineers' and Architects' and Pendennis Clubs of Louisville.

=== Death ===
Early in 1930 Montfort injured his head in a fall at age 75 and his health generally declined afterwards. He died in Atlantic City in February 1931, having traveled there in an attempt to recover his health.

Montfort's will and biographical notes, as well as some of his family's archives are held in the Barret family papers in the Special Collections of the Western Kentucky University libraries in Bowling Green.

== See also ==
- Louisville & Nashville Railroad
- Union Station (Nashville)
- L&N Station (Knoxville)
- History of Louisville, Kentucky
- History of Nashville, Tennessee
