= Romeo, Florida =

Unincorporated community in Florida, U.S.

Coordinates: 29°12′23″N 82°26′10″W

Romeo is an unincorporated community in Marion County, in the U.S. state of Florida.

A post office called Romeo was in operation between 1888 and 1955. The community may have been named after Romeo from William Shakespeare's tragedy Romeo and Juliet. According to local tradition, the community was named for two star-crossed lovers. The boy was from Romeo and the girl lived in Juliette (an extinct town).
