= High Springs Historic District =

Historic district in Florida, United States

- U.S. National Register of Historic Places
- U.S. Historic district
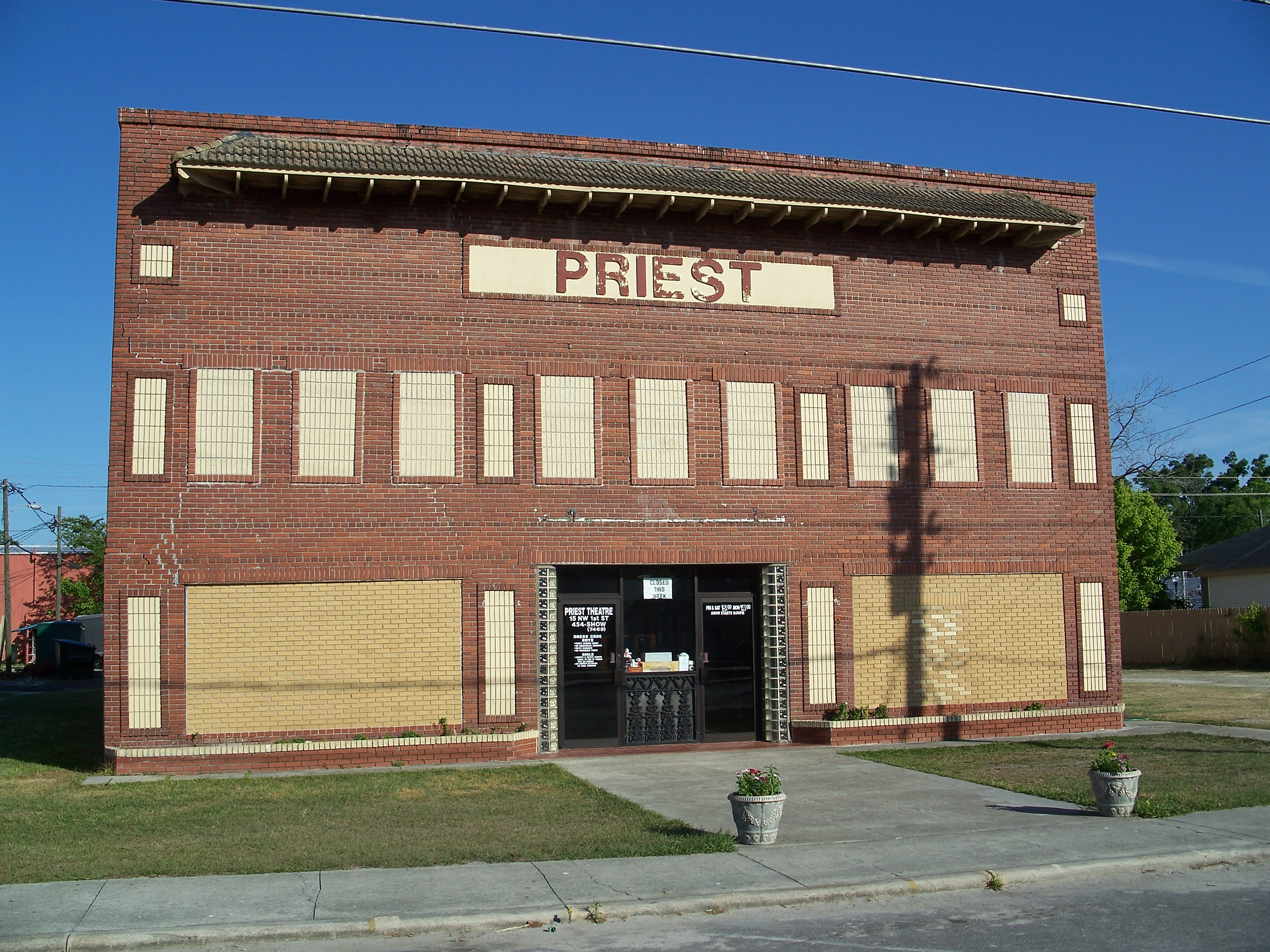
- The Priest Theatre in the High Springs Historic District

- Location within Florida Location within the United States
- Location: High Springs, Florida
- Coordinates: 29°49′32″N 82°35′48″W
- Area: 750 acres (3.0 km^{2})
- NRHP reference No.: 91001540
- Added to NRHP: October 31, 1991

The High Springs Historic District is a U.S. historic district (designated as such on October 31, 1991) located in High Springs, Florida. It encompasses approximately 750 acres (3.0 km^{2}), bounded by Northwest 14th Street, Northwest 6th Avenue, Southeast 7th Street and Southwest 5th Avenue. It contains 218 historic buildings.
