= Southland (train) =

Overview
- Service type: Inter-city rail
- Status: Discontinued
- Locale: Midwestern United States/Southeastern United States
- First service: 1915
- Last service: 1957
- Former operator(s): Pennsylvania Railroad/Wabash Railroad/Baltimore and Ohio Railroad/Louisville and Nashville Railroad/Central of Georgia Railway/Atlantic Coast Line Railroad/Florida East Coast Railway

Route
- Termini: Chicago, Illinois; St. Petersburg, Florida/Sarasota, Florida/Miami, Florida
- Service frequency: Daily (1946;1954)
- Train number(s): Southbound: PRR: 201, L&N: 33, ACL-west Florida section: 33/ ACL-east Florida section: 95; Northbound: ACL-west Florida section: 32/ ACL-east Florida section: 94, L&N: 32, PRR: 200

On-board services
- Seating arrangements: Reclining seat coaches
- Sleeping arrangements: Open sections and double bedrooms and compartments (1948)
- Catering facilities: Dining car

Technical
- Rolling stock: Streamlined passenger cars by Pullman Standard
- Track gauge: 4 ft 8 1/2 in (1,435 mm)

The Southland was a night train between Chicago, Illinois (at Union Station) and different points in western and eastern Florida from 1915 to 1957. In the early years it was called the New Southland. It was distinctive among Midwest to Florida trains as its western branch was the only all-season mid-20th-century long-distance train passing from Georgia to Florida bypassing the usual passenger train hub of Jacksonville Union Station. The main operator was the Louisville and Nashville Railroad, and pooling partners were the Pennsylvania Railroad, the Atlantic Coast Line Railroad and to lesser extent, the Wabash Railroad and the Florida East Coast Railway. For southeast bound -but not northwest bound- trips to Norfolk, Virginia, some coaches in 1946 diverged at Cincinnati along a Norfolk and Western Railway route. Northwest bound, travelers could switch trains at Cincinnati for heading towards Chicago.

== The route ==
The train began on Pennsylvania Railroad territory from Chicago to Cincinnati as train 200 southbound (and train 201 northbound); the Louisville and Nashville Railroad operated the Southland as train 33 (and train 32 northbound) from Cincinnati to eastern Kentucky, eastern Tennessee and then to Atlanta. Wabash Railroad trains carried passengers from Detroit to Fort Wayne, where passengers would switch to a Grand Rapids to Richmond, Indiana PRR train segment of the Pennsylvania Railroad train heading to Cincinnati and Florida. By the mid-1950s the Baltimore & Ohio replaced the Wabash for the Detroit-to-Cincinnati segment made the connection (#57 south, and #58 north), with through sleepers to St. Petersburg.

It travelled along Central of Georgia Railway territory from Atlanta's Atlanta Union Station to Macon's Terminal Station and Albany, Georgia's Union Station. Originally, the train went southeast from this point to Jacksonville, Florida. However, in a move that allowed the most direct route for trains through Atlanta to reach the western part of the Florida peninsula and the west coast, in 1928 the Southland operators moved the train over to the newly completed Perry Cutoff. The Atlantic Coast Line picked up the route from Albany to Thomasville, and then along the Perry Cutoff through western Florida.

=== Western routes ===
South of Macon ran the main western route, to Americus and Albany, Camilla, Pelham, Thomasville; Monticello, FL, Perry, Cross City, Dunnellon, Inverness and Trilby. After Trilby the route split and there were two different western Florida destinations: train 33 (train 32 northbound) via Atlantic Coast Line tracks to Tarpon Springs, Dunedin, Clearwater, St. Petersburg; and train 37 (train 38 northbound) splitting off the route at Trilby to Tampa and then to Bradenton and Sarasota. In later years, the south of Tampa segment would be replaced by a coordinated time departure bus for Bradenton, Sarasota and Fort Myers.

=== Eastern route ===
A secondary eastern section joined at Atlanta with the L&N's Dixie Flyer (train 95 southbound/train 94 northbound) via Atlantic Coast Line Railroad tracks to Jacksonville, and then along Florida East Coast Railway tracks to St. Augustine, Daytona Beach, New Smyrna Beach, Cocoa-Rockledge, Fort Pierce, West Palm Beach, Lake Worth, Fort Lauderdale, Hollywood and Miami.
