= Atlantic Coast Line Railroad =

Defunct American Class I railroad

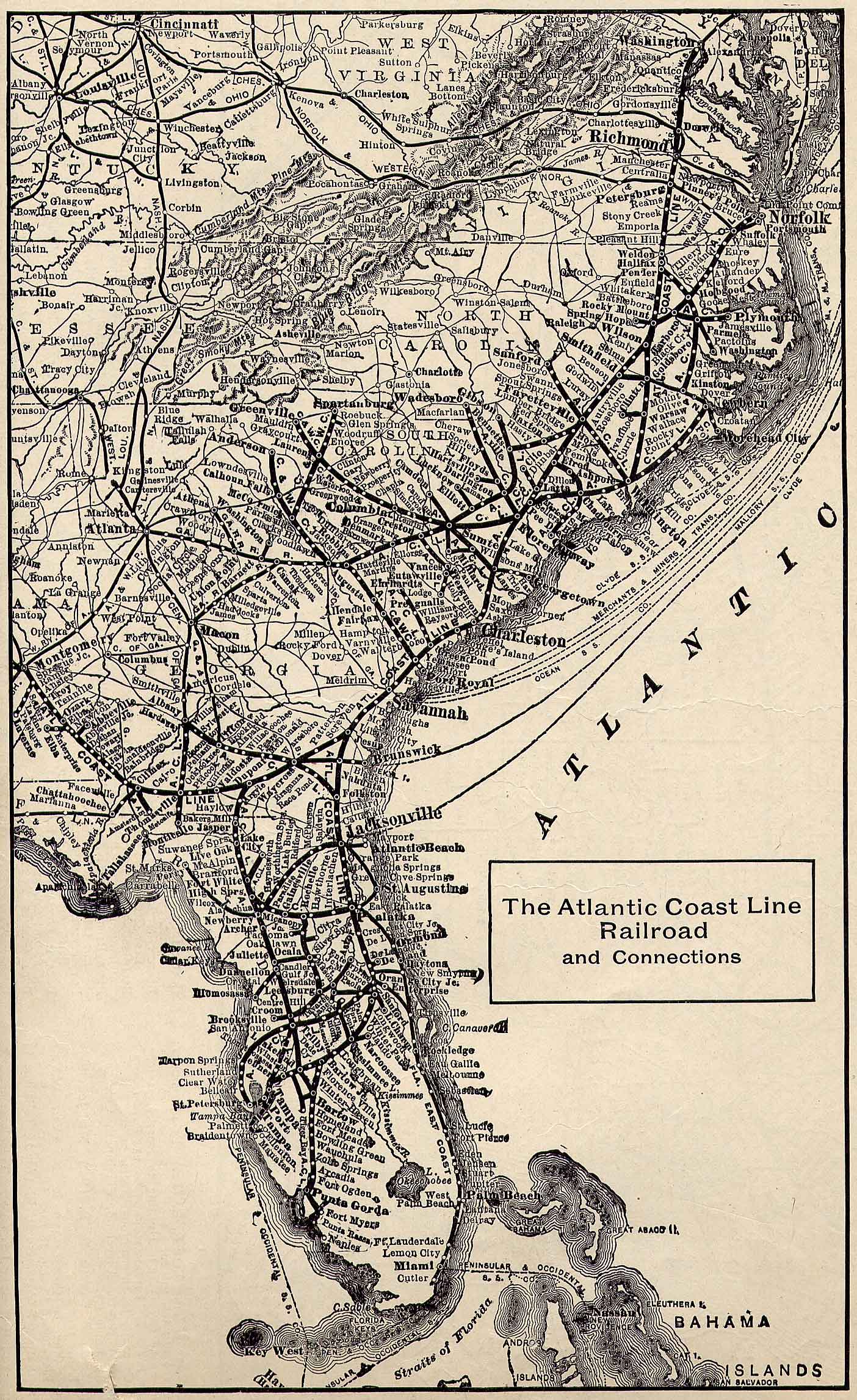
- ACL system map, c. 1914

Overview
- Headquarters: Wilmington, North Carolina (1900–1960); Atlantic Coast Line Railroad Building, 500 Water Street, Jacksonville, Florida (1960–1967)
- Reporting mark: ACL
- Locale: Alabama; Florida; Georgia; North Carolina; South Carolina; Virginia
- Dates of operation: 1871–1967
- Successor: Seaboard Coast Line Railroad

Technical
- Track gauge: 4 ft 8 1/2 in (1,435 mm) standard gauge
- Length: 5,155 miles (8,296 kilometres)

The Atlantic Coast Line Railroad (reporting mark ACL) was a United States Class I railroad formed in 1900, though predecessor railroads had used the ACL brand since 1871. In 1967, it merged with long-time rival Seaboard Air Line Railroad to form the Seaboard Coast Line Railroad. Much of the original ACL network has been part of CSX Transportation since 1986.

The Atlantic Coast Line served the Southeast, with a concentration of lines in Florida. Numerous named passenger trains were operated by the railroad for Florida-bound tourists, with the Atlantic Coast Line contributing significantly to Florida's economic development in the first half of the 20th century.

At the end of 1925, ACL operated 4,924 miles of road, not including its flock of subsidiaries; after some merging, mileage at the end of 1960 was 5,570 not including A&WP, CN&L, East Carolina, Georgia, Rockingham, and V&CS. In 1960, ACL reported 10,623 million net ton-miles of revenue freight and 490 million passenger-miles.

== History ==
=== Early history ===
The earliest predecessor of the ACL was the Petersburg Railroad between Petersburg, Virginia, and a point near Weldon, North Carolina, founded in 1830. A route between Richmond, Virginia, and Petersburg was built by the Richmond & Petersburg Railroad, which was founded in 1836. In 1840 the Wilmington and Weldon Railroad, at the time known as the Wilmington and Raleigh and renamed in 1855, completed a route between Weldon and Wilmington, North Carolina. From Wilmington, the Wilmington and Manchester Railroad began operations in 1853 to Florence, South Carolina, where the Northeastern Railroad operated to Charleston, South Carolina. In 1871, the W&W and the W&M (renamed the Wilmington, Columbia & Augusta) began using the Atlantic Coast Line name to advertise the two lines. An investor from Baltimore, William T. Walters, gained control of these separate railroads after the Civil War, and operated them as a network of independent companies. In 1897–98, most of the South Carolina lines in Walters' system were consolidated under the name of the Atlantic Coast Line Railroad Company of South Carolina. In 1898, as the companies moved towards combining themselves into a single system, the lines in Virginia were combined into the new Atlantic Coast Line Railroad Company of Virginia, and the lines in North Carolina underwent a similar process in 1899, becoming the Atlantic Coast Line Railroad Company of North Carolina. In 1899 or 1900, due to a regulatory climate in Virginia that was better suited to the company than that in other states, the ACL of Virginia took control of the other lines and subsequently shortened its name to the Atlantic Coast Line Railroad Company.

=== Forming the ACL by mergers ===
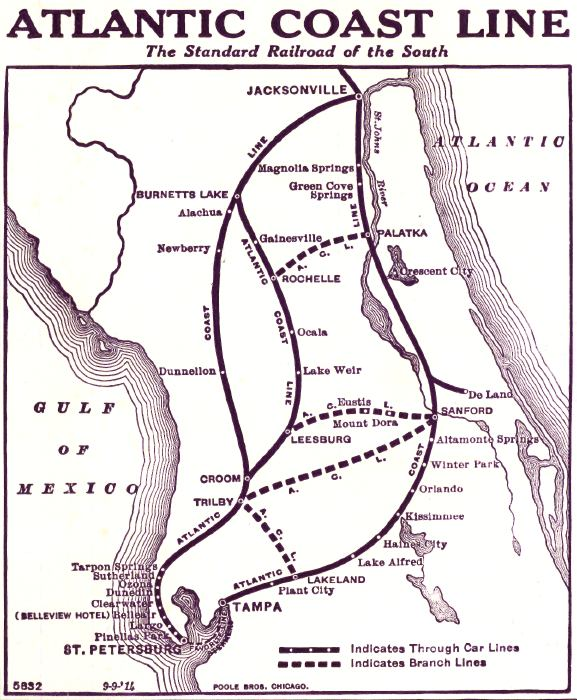
1914 map of the lines through Florida

In 1898, Petersburg Railroad and the Richmond and Petersburg Railroad formally merged, and two years later the combined company took control of the ACL's routes south of Virginia and the Norfolk and Carolina Railroad, which operated from Norfolk, Virginia to Tarboro, North Carolina. These mergers created an ACL system reaching from southern Virginia to South Carolina and Georgia. Other small acquisitions took place in 1901, and in 1902 the ACL took over the Plant System, which operated numerous lines within Florida and Georgia. This same year the ACL took control of the Louisville and Nashville Railroad as well as the Nashville, Chattanooga and St. Louis Railway, though the two were never merged into the ACL and were operated independently. The ACL acquired the East Carolina Railway in 1935, running south from Tarboro to Hookerton, although the 12-mile extension to Hookerton was abandoned in 1933.

The ACL's last major acquisition was the Atlanta, Birmingham and Coast Railroad, which it purchased in 1927, though the AB&C was not merged into the ACL until 1945.

Upon the formal incorporation of the ACL in 1900, an assessment was made of its repair and maintenance facilities. The oldest inherited shop site was at Wilmington, North Carolina, which dated to 1840. The shops in Florence, South Carolina were a bit more modern, having been upgraded in 1883. However, the sprawling ACL system needed larger and more modern facilities to handle locomotive overhauls and freight car building. By the 1920s the two largest shop sites were at South Rocky Mount, North Carolina and Waycross, Georgia, each of which employed about 2,000 workers. To handle extensions into Florida, in 1926 the ACL established the Uceta shops and yard outside of Tampa, Florida at a cost of $2 million.

=== Later history ===
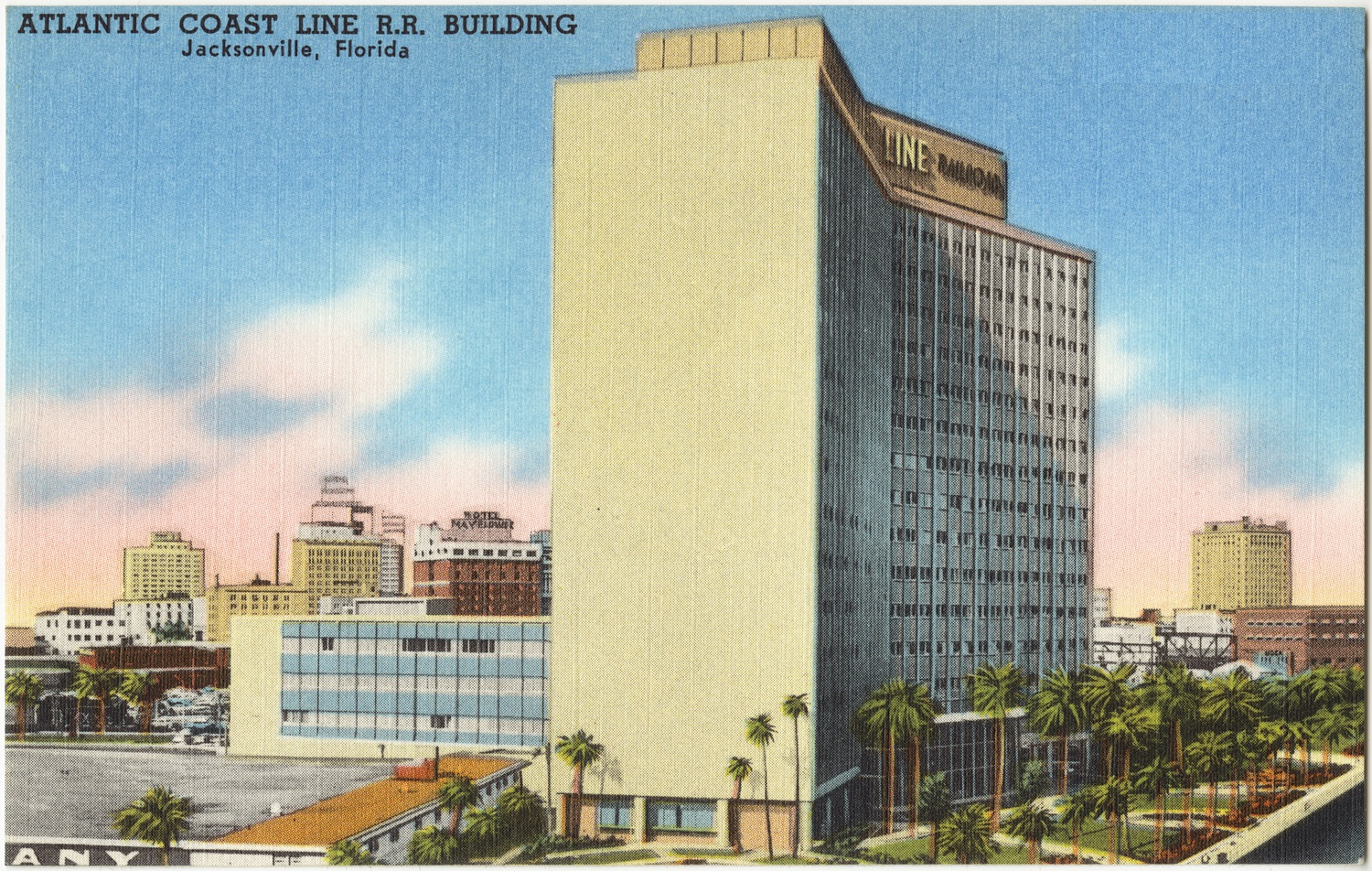
Atlantic Coast Line headquarters, Jacksonville, Florida.

By the early 1900s the railroad had largely reached its final configuration and began to focus on upgrading its physical plant. By the 1920s the railroad's main line from Richmond, Virginia to Jacksonville, Florida had been double-tracked, which benefited the railroad during the 1920s when Florida boomed.

In 1928 the ACL completed a line between Perry, Florida and Drifton, near Monticello, Florida, the last link of the new "Perry Cutoff". This created a more direct route between Chicago and Florida's west coast and bypassing Jacksonville, one which passed through Macon, Albany, and Thomasville, the route followed by ACL's passenger train Southland from December 1928 to 1957 when it was rerouted to Jacksonville.

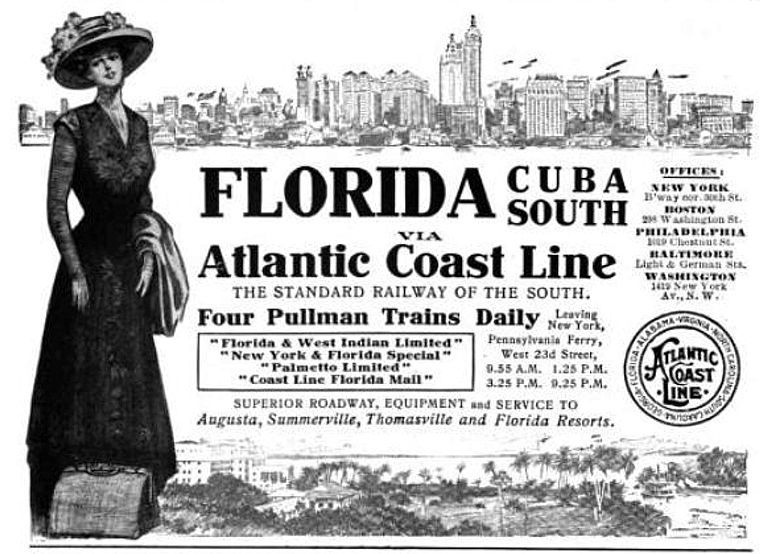
1910 advertisement for ACL trains from New York to Florida

During the Great Depression ACL's freight traffic declined by around 60%, but the railroad survived the 1930s without declaring bankruptcy; its success in this regard has been attributed to its leadership and careful financial practices, as well as owning the Louisville and Nashville, which remained strong through the Depression.

During World War II ACL's passenger traffic increased 200% and freight traffic 150%. The railroad provided a submarine-proof alternative to coastal shipping, and it also served the fast-emerging military industry in the Southeast. In 1942, Champion McDowell Davis (nicknamed "Champ") became president of the ACL after starting with the railroad in the 1890s as a messenger boy. He immediately began an improvement program that finished in the mid-1950s, including the rebuilding of several hundred miles of track, the installation of modern signaling systems and improvements to freight yards. The railroad spent at least $268 million in upgrading its physical plant during this period. On June 30, 1955, the railroad retired its last steam locomotive.

In 1956 the railroad moved its headquarters, which had been sited at and adjacent to Wilmington, North Carolina's Union Station to Jacksonville, Florida. Jacksonville was selected from three candidate cities, the other two being Savannah, Georgia and Charleston, South Carolina. Construction of the new office complex was finished in July 1960, with the move from Wilmington completed over the following weeks.

=== Merger ===
As early as October 1958 the ACL and competitor Seaboard Air Line Railroad had discussed the possibility of a merger, initiating extensive studies on the potential unified system. The results showed that the merger could save considerable money through savings incurred and reduced expenditures to the amount of $38 million annually. On August 18, 1960, the merger was approved by shareholders of both railroads. In 1963, a merger between the two companies was approved by the Interstate Commerce Commission, however, petitions for reconsideration were filed leading to a court decision to remand the approval of the merger on May 13, 1965, citing the Clayton Antitrust Act. Following another round of court decisions in 1966, the merger was allowed to proceed, and did so on July 1, 1967. The result was the creation of the Seaboard Coast Line.

== Lines ==
The backbone of the Atlantic Coast Line Railroad was its main line, which ran nearly 900 miles from Richmond, Virginia to just south of Tampa, Florida. By 1952, the company operated over 5,000 miles of track including the main line and numerous secondary lines and branch lines. The network extended as far west as Birmingham, Alabama and as far south as Everglades City, Florida at its height.

== Traffic ==
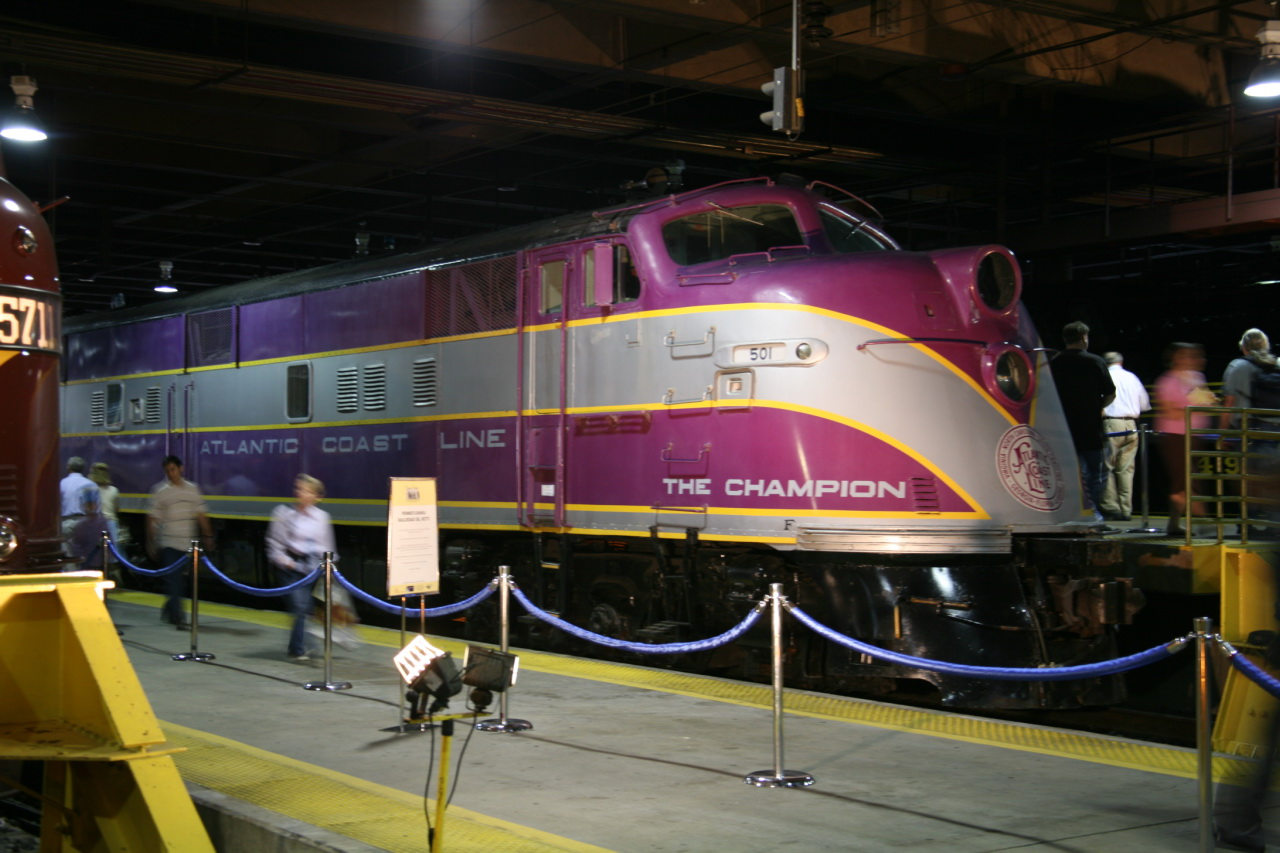
ACL #501, an EMC E3, pulled the Champion and now resides at the North Carolina Transportation Museum.

=== Freight ===
During its early years, the ACL handled mostly seasonal agricultural products, but by World War II its freight traffic had become more diverse. During the 1950s, around 44% of all freight traffic consisted of manufactured and miscellaneous items, while bulk traffic like coal and phosphates also expanded during this time. During the 1950s, the ACL acquired some 13,000 new freight cars, to be used on high-speed trains offering reduced running times compared to earlier equipment. This allowed the railroad to remain competitive in the face of competition from the Interstate highway system.

=== Passenger ===
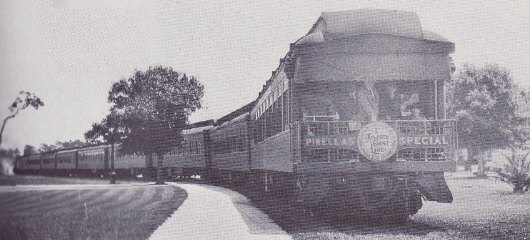
The ACL's Pinellas Special in Belleair, Florida, in 1920

The ACL's passenger traffic consisted almost entirely of Florida-bound traffic, largely from the Northeast, but also from the Midwest via trains that were operated by multiple railroads and handled by the ACL at their southern ends. In 1939, in response to the Seaboard's popular new streamliner, the Silver Meteor, the ACL launched its first streamlined train, the all-coach Champion. ACL invested heavily in its passenger fleet after World War II but passenger revenue fell from $28.5 million in 1946 to $14.1 million in 1959. Until its 1967 merger the railroad continued to maintain and improve its passenger service, even replacing old stations with new.

==== Major passenger trains ====
All of ACL's New York - Florida trains ran on the Pennsylvania Railroad north of Washington, D. C., then via the Richmond, Fredericksburg and Potomac Railroad from Washington to Richmond. Tampa/St. Petersburg trains used ACL rails south of Richmond all the way to their destinations. Trains for Miami ran on the Florida East Coast Railway from Jacksonville to Miami, but after passenger service on the FEC effectively ended with a long-lasting strike in 1963, ACL transferred its Miami-bound trains to Seaboard rails at Auburndale, Florida.

New York-Florida routes:

- Champion (New York - Tampa/St. Petersburg, and New York - Miami)
- Everglades (New York – Jacksonville)
- Florida Special (New York – Miami/St. Petersburg) (winter only; a rival to Seaboard's Orange Blossom Special)
- Gulf Coast Special (New York – Tampa/Ft. Myers/St. Petersburg)
- Havana Special (New York – Key West, prior to the 1935 Labor Day hurricane.)
- Miamian (Washington – Miami)
- Vacationer (New York – Miami)

Midwest-Florida routes:

- City of Miami (Chicago-Miami)
- Dixie Flagler (Chicago-Miami)
- Dixie Flyer (Chicago-Miami; shortened in final four years to Atlanta-Jacksonville)
- Dixie Limited (Chicago-Jacksonville)
- Flamingo (Cincinnati-Jacksonville)
- Seminole (Chicago-Jacksonville)
- South Wind (Chicago-St. Petersburg/Miami)
- Southland (Cincinnati—St. Petersburg/Ft. Myers/Miami; sole year-round passenger train to bypass Jacksonville and run through the western side of Florida)

Other routes:

- Palmetto (New York – Savannah, S.C./Augusta, Ga./Wilmington, N.C.)
- Tar Heel (New York and Norfolk -Wilmington)

== In popular culture ==
In Preston Sturges' 1942 comedy The Palm Beach Story, main character Gerry Jeffers (Claudette Colbert) boards the Florida Special (ACL's premier, winter-only train) in New York City's Pennsylvania Station.

== See also ==
- List of Atlantic Coast Line Railroad predecessors
- Atlantic Coast Line 1504
