= Tampa and Gulf Coast Railroad =

- Interactive map of the Tampa and Gulf Coast Railroad

Overview
- Reporting mark: T&G
- Dates of operation: 1909–1927
- Successor: Seaboard Air Line Railroad

Technical
- Track gauge: 4 ft 8 1/2 in (1,435 mm) standard gauge

The Tampa and Gulf Coast Railroad (T&G) was a railroad company in the Tampa Bay Area of Florida in the United States. It initially built and operated a line that ran from the Tampa Northern Railroad main line in Lutz (just north of Tampa) west to Tarpon Springs and into Pasco County. Additional track starting from Sulphur Springs running west towards Clearwater and south to St. Petersburg was built shortly after. The railroad was informally known as the "Tug n' Grunt" and the "Pea Vine" due to its frequent twists and turns. While it was the second railroad to serve St. Petersburg and Clearwater after the Orange Belt Railway, it had the advantage of being the first to connect the area directly with Tampa.

== History ==
=== Construction and early years ===
The Tampa and Gulf Coast Railroad was incorporated in 1909. In 1910, it acquired a logging railroad operated by the Gulf Pine Company that ran from Lutz, where it connected to the main line of the Tampa Northern Railroad, west to Gulf Pine via Lake Fern. The T&G then extended this line west to Tarpon Springs, where it terminated less than a block away from the Atlantic Coast Line Railroad's track (the former Orange Belt Railway). The extension connected with another line from Lake Villa north to Elfers and New Port Richey, which the T&G bought from J.M. Weeks and Company in 1912.

In 1914, a second line was built south of the first line from Sulphur Springs, also on the Tampa Northern Railroad main line, west through what is now Oldsmar, across Tampa Bay, and through Safety Harbor to Clearwater. Just south of Clearwater in Belleair, the line crossed the ACL's track and headed south. A branch was also built from the line near Largo west to Indian Rocks Beach. From Belleair, the line ran south to the southeast part of the Pinellas Peninsula near Seminole. It then crossed Long Bayou and south to South Pasadena before turning east to St. Petersburg. The T&G built a passenger depot in St. Petersburg at Ninth Street and Second Avenue. During this time, a branch line was also built to connect the two T&G lines from Rocky Creek (then known as Tarpon Junction) on the line leading to Clearwater to Lake Fern on the line leading to Tarpon Springs, which allowed the T&G to abandon the segment of the original line between Lake Fern and Lutz. The T&G would provide passenger and freight service to the Pinellas peninsula on its lines. The Indian Rocks Beach Branch was used to bring passengers from Tampa, which helped Indian Rocks Beach become a tourist destination.

=== Acquisition by the Seaboard Air Line ===
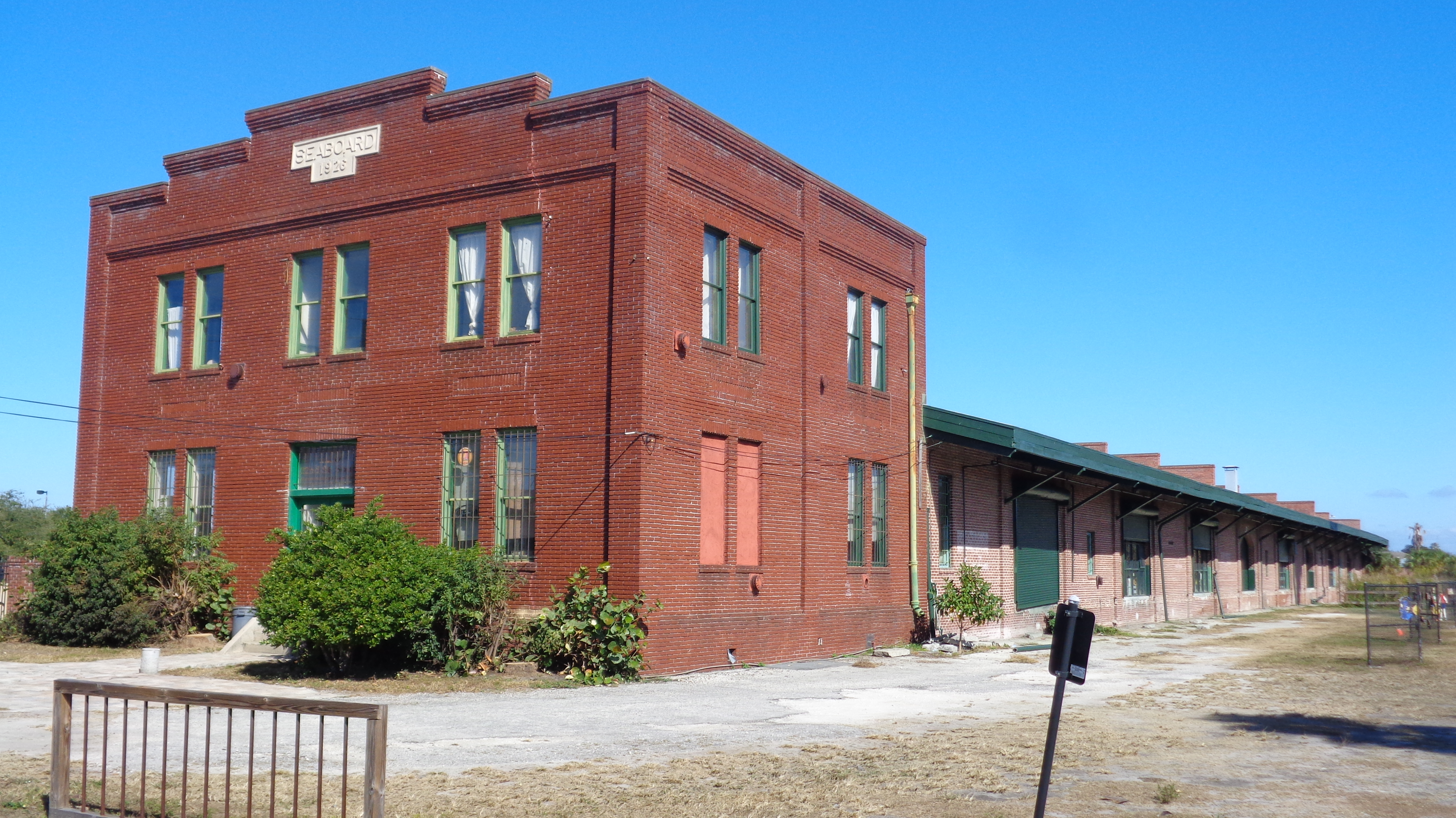
St. Petersburg freight station, which was built in 1926

Tampa Subdivision

Overview
- Status: Some segments are still operating
- Owner: Seaboard Air Line Railroad

Technical
- Track gauge: 1,435 mm (4 ft 8 1/2 in) standard gauge
- Electrification: No

The Tampa and Gulf Coast Railroad only briefly operated as an independent company. In 1915, it was bought out by the Seaboard Air Line Railroad (SAL), who bought the Tampa Northern Railroad two years prior. The SAL continued to operate the T&G as a separate rail line until it was fully integrated with the SAL network in 1927. The Seaboard Air Line would designate the line as part of their Tampa Subdivision (which also included track from Sulphur Springs to Gary and the Seaboard main line between Tampa Union Station and Coleman). The branches to Tarpon Springs and Elfers were designated as the Tarpon Springs Subdivision and Elfers Subdivision respectively. The Seaboard Air Line would extend a number of their long-distance passenger trains from Tampa to St. Petersburg along the route including the Orange Blossom Special, the Southern States Special, the Florida Sunbeam, and the New York-Florida Limited.

=== Later years ===
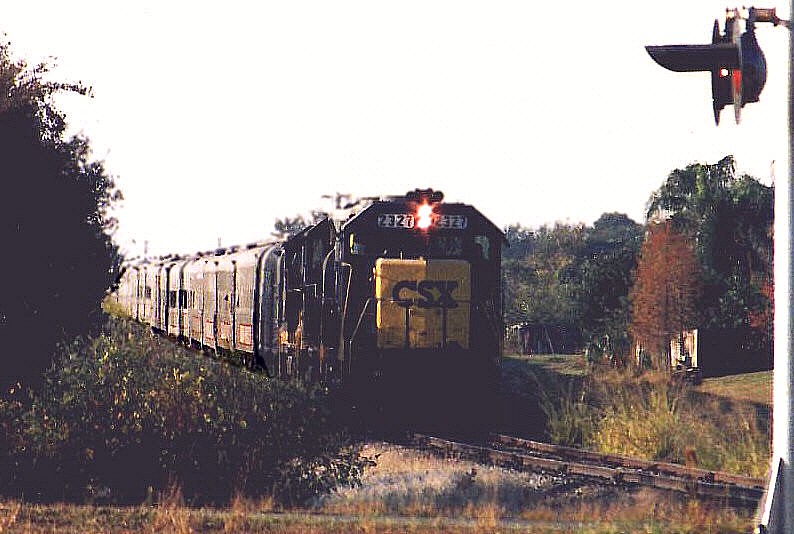
CSX train operating on the former Tampa and Gulf Coast Railroad though Safety Harbor in 1992.

Passenger service on the Indian Rocks Beach spur declined in the 1920s, and by 1928, the bridge carrying the branch to Indian Rocks Beach was removed. The rest of the spur from the main line to the ghost town of Anona would remain until the early 1940s.

Seaboard would go on to merge with the Atlantic Coast Line Railroad (ACL) in 1967, who still operated their own rail line in the area. The resulting company after the merger was the Seaboard Coast Line Railroad (SCL), who connected the two Pinellas County routes where they crossed near Belleair. The T&G became the westernmost segment of the company's Yeoman Subdivision. After the merger, passenger service was provided by the Silver Star and the Champion (which was replaced by the Silver Meteor in 1979). Though, passenger service would be rerouted to the ex-ACL line in Belleair since all passenger traffic consolidated at the ACL's St. Petersburg station. The T&G from Belleair south was then used for local freight only. Passenger trains were taken over by Amtrak in 1971 and were discontinued between Tampa and St. Petersburg in 1984.

In 1980, the Seaboard Coast Line's parent company merged with the Chessie System, creating the CSX Corporation. The CSX Corporation initially operated the Chessie and Seaboard Systems separately until 1986, when they were merged into CSX Transportation. In 1983, the company sold the original Tampa and Gulf Coast Railroad right of way from Belleair to 34th Street South in St. Petersburg to the Florida Department of Transportation. This segment is now part of the Pinellas Trail (which also continues north from Belleair along the former Orange Belt/Atlantic Coast Line route). Track east of 34th Street South in St. Petersburg (which connected to the ex-ACL line near Tropicana Field) remained in service as the South Side Spur until the mid-2000s, when it was also removed and became part of the Pinellas Trail.

CSX continues to operate the remaining tracks of the Tampa and Gulf Coast Railroad, which is now part of their Clearwater Subdivision. The Upper Tampa Bay Trail runs along some of the former right of way of the Tarpon Springs Branch.

== Historic stations ==
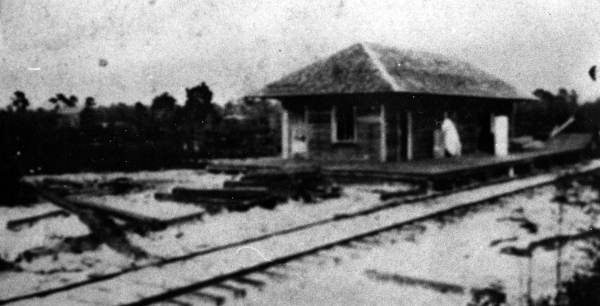
Depot in New Port Richey

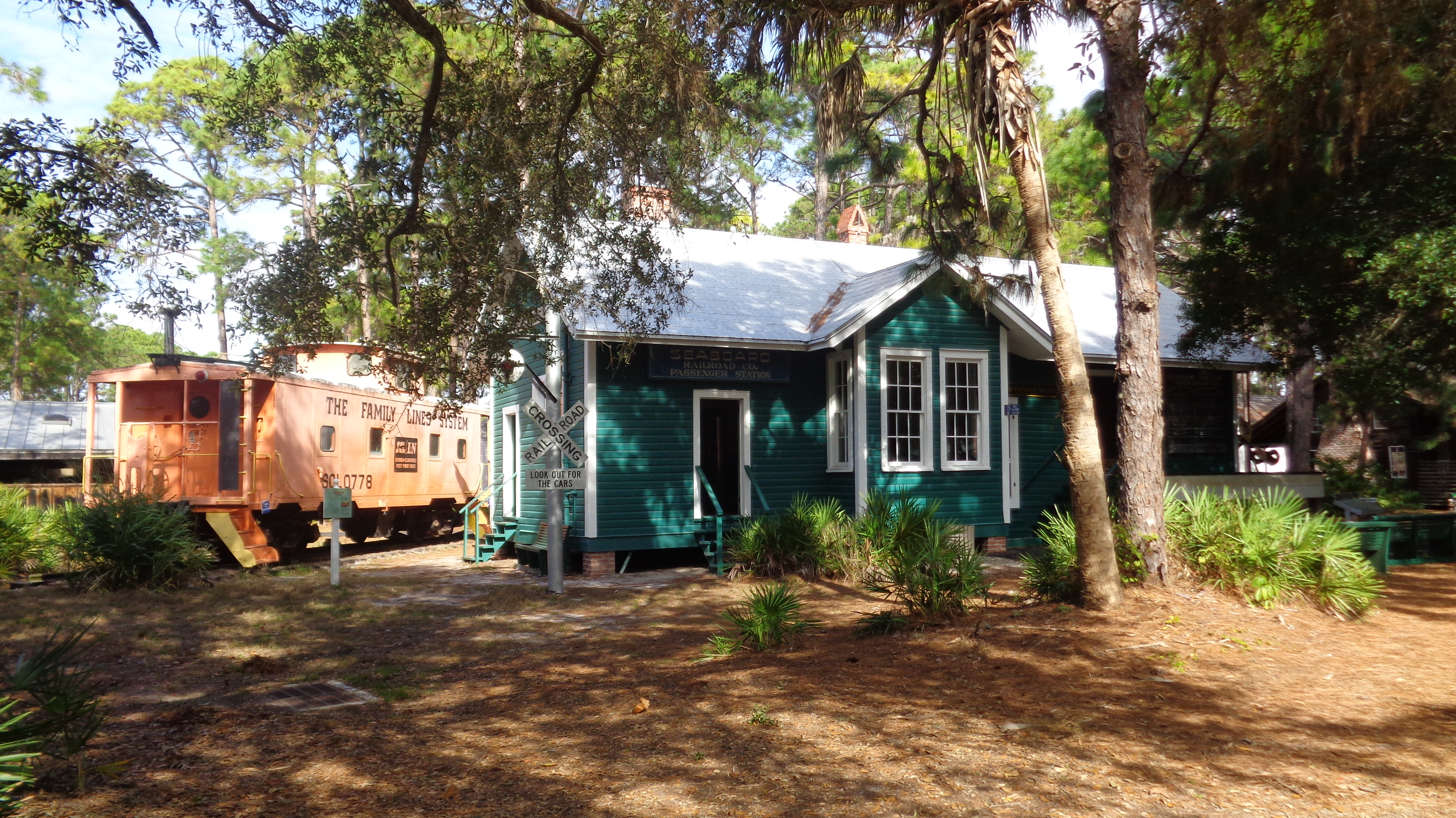
Depot built in 1924 by the Tampa and Gulf Coast Railroad in Sulphur Springs, Florida. It is currently located at Heritage Village in Largo, Florida.

Tampa to St. Petersburg
Milepost	City/Location	Station	Connections and notes
S 844.9	Tampa	Tampa Union Station	located on Seaboard Air Line Railroad Main Line
SY 843.2	Tampa	Gary	located on Tampa Northern Railroad junction with: Atlantic Coast Line Railroad Main Line; Seaboard Air Line Railroad Main Line
SY 848.6	Tampa	Sulphur Springs	also known as Gulf Coast Junction junction with Tampa Northern Railroad (SAL)
		Lakeview	
SY 856.4	Rocky Creek	Tarpon Junction	junction with Tarpon Springs Branch
SY 862.6	Oldsmar	Oldsmar	
		Bridgeport	
SY 867.1	Safety Harbor	Safety Harbor	
SY 870.2		Coachman	
SY 874.9	Clearwater	Clearwater	
SY 876.1	Belleair	Belleair	junction with Atlantic Coast Line Railroad Trilby–St. Petersburg Line
SY 878.1	Largo	Largo	
SY 879.7	Largo	Indian Beach Junction	junction with Indian Rocks Beach Branch
SY 883.4		Oakhurst	
SY 884.6	Seminole	Seminole	
SY 885.2	Bay Pines	Bay Pines	
SY 888.5		Tyrone	
SY 889.4		Pasadena	originally named Davista
SY 892.5	Gulfport	Gulfport	
SY 896.0	St. Petersburg	St. Petersburg	junction with Atlantic Coast Line Railroad Trilby–St. Petersburg Line freight depot built in 1927; Original T&G passenger depot was located at Second Avenue and Ninth street (operated from 1916 to 1959). 1959-1967 passenger depot was located on the northeast corner of 34th Street South and Fairfield Avenue.

Tarpon Springs Branch
Milepost	City/Location	Station	Opening date	Connections and notes
SYA 856.3	Rocky Creek	Tarpon Junction	1914	junction with Main line
SYA 859.1	Citrus Park	Citrus Park	1914	
SYA 861.4	Citrus Park	Cosme	1914	
SYA 864.3	Lake Fern	Lake Fern	1910	junction with original line to Lutz
SYA 866.6		Gulf Pine	1910	
	Keystone	Keystone	1910	
	Keystone	Kimbrough	1910	
SYA 874.4	East Lake	Lake Villa	1910	junction with Elfers Branch
SYA 877.8	Tarpon Springs	Tarpon Springs	1910	

Elfers Branch
Milepost	City/Location	Station	Connections and notes
SYB 874.7	East Lake	Lake Villa	junction with Tarpon Springs Branch
SYB 878.8	Elfers	Sans Souci	
SYB 879.4	Elfers	Elfers	
SYB 881.7	Port Richey	Port Richey	

Indian Rocks Beach Branch
Milepost	City/Location	Station	Connections and notes
SYC 879.7	Largo	Indian Beach Junction	junction with Main line
SYC 881.7	Largo	Anona	
SYC 882.3	Indian Rocks Beach	Indian Rocks Beach	

== See also ==
- Seaboard Coast Line Railroad station (St. Petersburg, Florida)
