= Brooksville Railroad Depot Museum =

Brooksville, FL
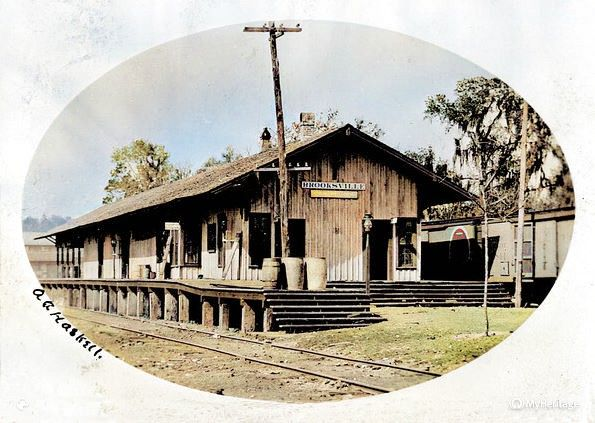
- Brooksville 1885 Railroad Depot

General information
- Location: Brooksville, Florida; United States
- Coordinates: 28.5490°N 82.3855°W

History
- Opened: 1885
Former services
Preceding station	Atlantic Coast Line Railroad	Following station
Wiscon toward St. Petersburg	Ocala District	Croom toward Jacksonville
Preceding station	Seaboard Air Line Railroad	Following station
Tooke Lake Junction toward Tampa	Brooksville Subdivision	Lake Lindsay toward Waldo
Location

The Brooksville 1885 Train Depot is one of three museums operated by the Hernando Historical Museum Association. The museum is located just south of downtown Brooksville, Florida, on Russell Street. It was originally built by the Florida Southern Railway. The museum is dedicated to the railroad, and local history of Brooksville, Hernando County, and Florida.

== History ==
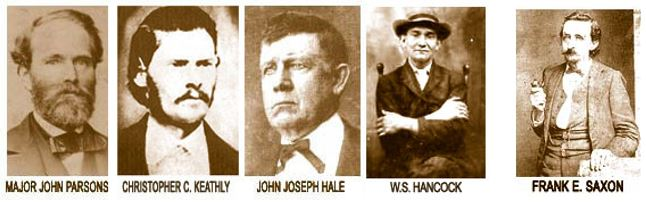
Brooksville Businessmen

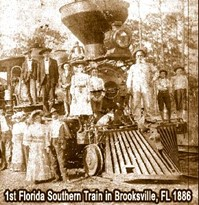

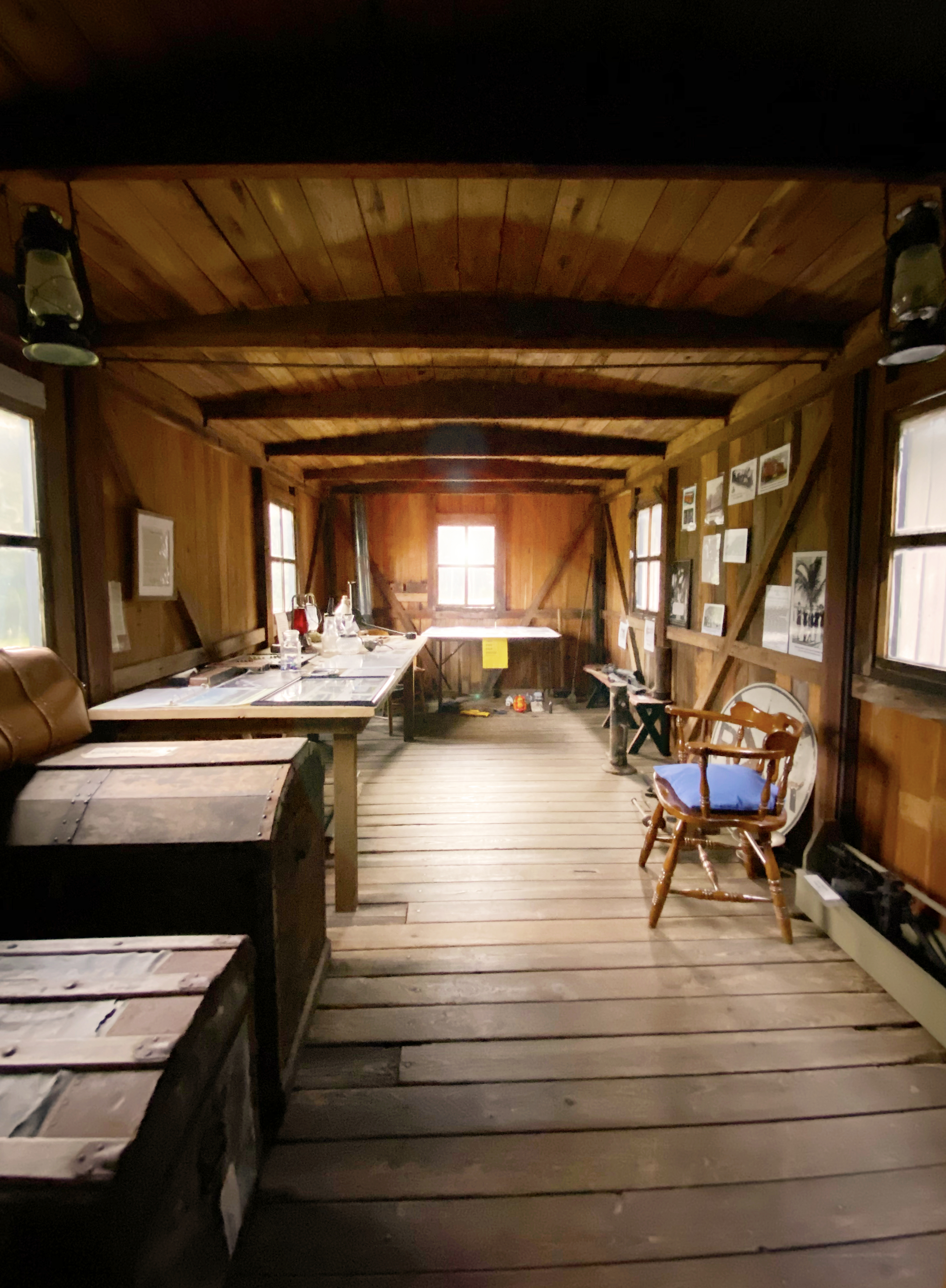
Cook- Utility Car at the Brooksville 1885 Train Depot

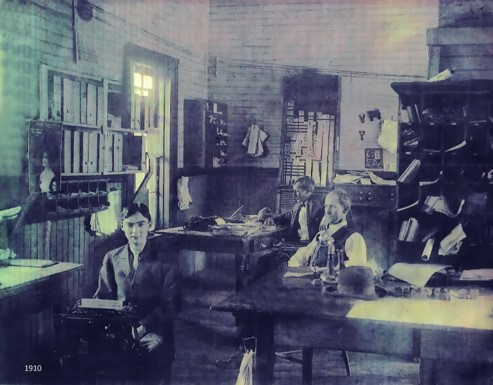
Train Depot Office

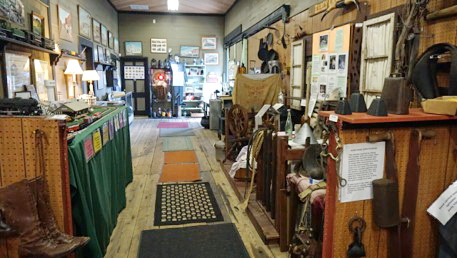
Train Depot Freight Room

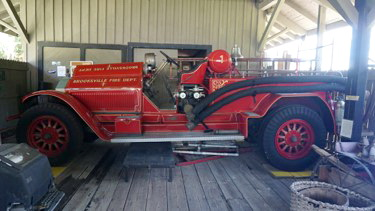
1885 Train Depot Dock area with 1925 American La France Fire Truck

In the 1880s America experienced a vast expanse of railroads. 75,000 miles of track were built. The state of Florida went from 500 miles of track to 2,489 miles of track in ten years.

Although roads have been important in providing the residents of Hernando with a means of transportation, it was not until the extension of the railroad to Brooksville, the commercial center of the county, that the area was given a real opportunity to grow. Some railroads had been constructed in Florida before the Civil War, but they were short, isolated ones for the most part. No construction occurred during the war and extraordinarily little directly after it.

By 1880, Florida had 550 miles of railroad concentrated north of Ocala. But over the next decade, Henry B. Plant in the western section of the state and Henry Flagler along the Atlantic coast built hundreds of miles of rail, extending the state's total to 2,566 miles. As a result, thousands of square miles of backcountry were opened to the tourist and the real estate operators.

In the early 1880s, the closest rail contact for Hernando County residents was at Wildwood, thirty miles to the northeast. Merchandise, produce, tourists and other items bound for Brooksville had to be transported there by wagon or stage over miles of dusty trails. Naturally, the people longed for the day when they would have a rail connection to the northern markets.

Their hopes were raised when the Florida Southern Railroad was incorporated in 1879 to strike a line from Central Florida to Charlotte Harbor (Port Charlotte). By 1881 it had pushed south to Gainesville and by 1885 it was at Pemberton Ferry, near Croom, just ten miles east of Brooksville. However the railroad had no plans to extend to Brooksville.

Despite all the railroad activity, Brooksville and a great portion of the county was still lacking a railroad in 1885. Several local citizens then realized that they had better act fast, or Brooksville might remain in a state of virtual isolation.

Led by John Hale, four forward-thinking business leaders (John Parsons, Christopher Keathly, John Hale, and W.S. Hancock) in the tiny town of Brooksville were eager to bring the railroad to their area. They formed the Brooksville Railroad Association and The Brooksville Telegraph Company and paid $20,000 to The Florida Southern Railroad to lay track twelve miles from the main line at Pemberton Ferry (Croom) to Brooksville. Bonds were sold and the Train Depot was built in 1885. The building still stands today. W.S. Hancock and Frank Saxon became officers of the telegraph company.

The Florida Southern Railroad was part the Plant railroad system. Henry Plant took his railroad to Tampa and beyond. He aided the development of Tampa as a major port.

In 1911 the Tampa Northern Railroad built an additional line north from Tampa to Brooksville. This gave Hernando County two daily passenger and freight schedules. Supplementing the Croom line were some small spur lines built from Brooksville to the Gulf of Mexico for logging camps with tracks running to the Fivay Mill in Pasco county, to Wiscon, Tooke Lake, and Centralia.

The Atlantic Coast Line bought the Florida Southern Railroad, and both Atlantic Coast Line and Tampa Northern serviced the Brooksville Train Depot. In 1911 the Tampa Northern Railroad built an additional line north from Tampa to Brooksville. This gave Hernando County two daily passenger and freight schedules. Supplementing the Croom line were some small spur lines built from Brooksville to the Gulf of Mexico for logging camps with tracks running to the Fivay Mill in Pasco county, to Wiscon, Tooke Lake, and Centralia.

In 1911 the Tampa Northern Railroad built an additional line north from Tampa to Brooksville. This gave Hernando County two daily passenger and freight schedules. Supplementing the Croom line were some small spur lines built from Brooksville to the Gulf of Mexico for logging camps with tracks running to the Fivay Mill in Pasco county, to Wiscon, Tooke Lake, and Centralia.

The Atlantic Coast Line bought the Florida Southern Railroad, and both Atlantic Coast Line and Tampa Northern serviced the Brooksville Train Depot.

After the stock market crash in 1929, the railroad business plummeted. The spur to Tooke Lake and Centralia was closed, along with many other little-used railroads. Trucks hauled freight and automobiles took the place of passenger train cars. Railroads fought back with piggyback flat cars that hauled the loaded trucks. Railroads offered special excursion train rides. School groups rode the train from Brooksville to Tampa for day-long field trips. The railroad offered vacation packages to South Florida travelers from Hernando County.

These efforts were not successful and railroad use continued to decline. By the early 1960s the tracks at the Brooksville depot were gone. The depot was used as an administrative office a few more years before it closed completely.

In 1967 the two big railroads, Atlantic Coast Line and Seaboard Air Line merged and called the new railroad, Seaboard Coast Line (SCL). In 1980 another merger of several railroads caused the formation of the CSX railroad, the largest railroad system in the United States. The vacant Brooksville Train Depot became the property of the CSX railroad.

=== Museum ===
In 1991 The Hernando Historical Museum Association purchased the 1885 Train Depot along with an acre and half of land from CSX for $12,600 and restored the building. It is now a museum for visitors to enjoy.

The 1885 Train Depot Museum is made up of four parts.

The Office – Visitors enter in the office area, the front of the depot. This is where passengers came to buy their tickets, arrange for freight shipment, and send telegrams.

The Freight Room – The freight room houses train artifacts and displays depicting historical railroad events. Two HO model train exhibits delight the kids and adults alike. See original objects used by early settlers as they struggled to survive in the wilderness of Hernando County.

The Freight Dock – On the enclosed dock of the museum, ring the bell, sound the siren, or take your child's picture sitting in an original 1925 LaFrance Fire Engine; the first fire engine purchased by the city of Brooksville.

Also, on the dock are exhibits of farm equipment, industrial tools, and more railroad apparatus.

Cook \ Utility Box Car – Ron Daniel, while a Southwest Florida Water Management employee, discovered an abandoned box car in a swampy area southeast of Brooksville in Sumter County. It was hauled to the Brooksville Train Depot and restored. The work car was originally owned by Cummer Sons Cypress Lumber Company which cut timber in the area of the “Green Swamp”. The work car's normal function was to transport workers to the work site, but the box car could be used to provide space for cooking and eating, sleeping, office work, and machinery operations.
