= St. Petersburg station =

St. Petersburg station may refer to:

- St. Petersburg station (Amtrak), former Amtrak train station in St. Petersburg, Florida
- Seaboard Coast Line Railroad station (St. Petersburg, Florida), former train station in St. Petersburg, Florida
- Moscow Passazhirskaya railway station, formerly Peterburgsky or St. Petersburg Station
