= Clearwater Subdivision =

Railway line in Florida

The Clearwater Subdivision is a railroad line owned by CSX Transportation in the Tampa Bay region of Florida. The 48.6 miles (78.2 km) runs from Tampa to Clearwater and St. Petersburg.

== Route description ==
The Clearwater Subdivision begins just east of downtown Tampa in Gary, connecting with the Tampa Terminal Subdivision. From Gary, the Clearwater Subdivision heads north through some of Tampa's suburban neighborhoods. In Sulphur Springs, the Clearwater Subdivision connects with the Brooksville Subdivision, which runs north while the Clearwater Subdivision turns west. Five miles west of Sulphur Springs, a short spur runs from the line south to Drew Park. Further west, the Clearwater Subdivision turns and runs west through Oldsmar, where it crosses Tampa Bay. It briefly shifts south running through Safety Harbor, and then heads west again to Clearwater. In Clearwater, it turns southeast, running through Largo and Pinellas Park before terminating at Fifth Avenue North in St. Petersburg near Tropicana Field.

== Operation ==
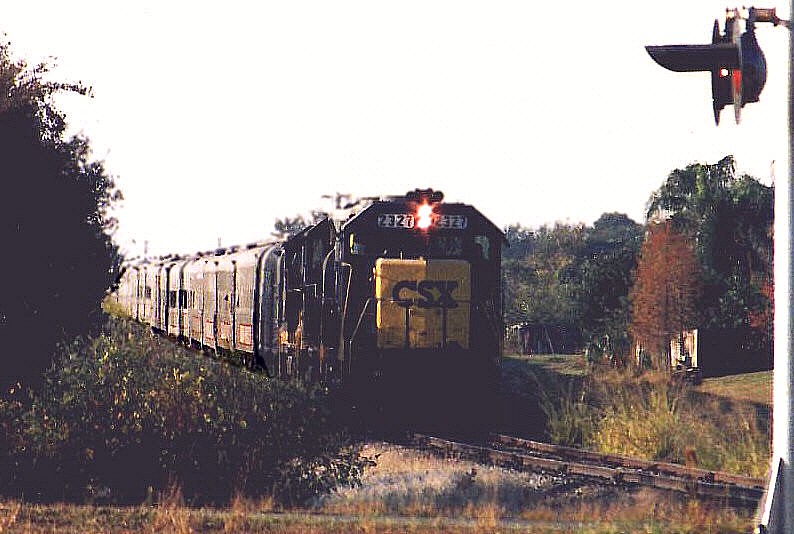
CSX locomotives pulling a circus train in Safety Harbor, Florida, on the Clearwater Subdivision in 1992

The Clearwater Subdivision is used for local freight shipments throughout the area. CSX serves an automobile transload facility on the Drew Park Spur which generates a considerable amount of traffic on the line. This facility is operated by Total Distribution Services, a CSX subsidiary.

== History ==
From Tampa north to Sulphur Springs, the Clearwater Subdivision runs along the former Tampa Northern Railroad, which was built in 1908. From Sulphur Springs west to Clearwater, it runs along the former Tampa and Gulf Coast Railroad, which was built in 1914. Both the Tampa Northern Railroad and the Tampa and Gulf Coast Railroad were absorbed by the Seaboard Air Line Railroad (SAL) in 1913 and 1915 respectively. From Clearwater to St. Petersburg, the line runs along the southern end of the historic Orange Belt Railway, which was built in 1888. The Orange Belt Railway later became part of the Plant System, which soon after became part of the Atlantic Coast Line Railroad (ACL).

The Silver Meteor of the Seaboard Air Line Railroad (SAL) with shrouded steam locomotive #865 at the St. Petersburg station in 1940.

From the 1910s to the 1960s, both the ACL and SAL operated long-distance passenger trains over their respective portions of what is now the Clearwater Subdivision. SAL trains ran the line between Gary and Clearwater, with stations in Oldsmar and Safety Harbor. Beyond Clearwater, SAL track continued south along the present-day Pinellas Trail to St. Petersburg. ACL trains ran on the now-CSX Clearwater Subdivision's tracks between Clearwater and St. Petersburg. The ACL's line previously continued north from Clearwater to Dunedin, Tarpon Springs, and Trilby. When Amtrak took over rail passenger service on May 1, 1971, it operated the Silver Meteor and Silver Star deluxe passenger trains over the line via Tampa, providing Clearwater and St. Petersburg with daily overnight service to New York and intermediate points.

Both the Atlantic Coast Line and the Seaboard Air Line networks merged on July 1, 1967, to form the Seaboard Coast Line Railroad (SCL). In the years following the merger, the SAL track was abandoned south of Clearwater, replaced by a new crossover built in North Clearwater at milepost SY 873.0 to permit use of the former ACL line south to St. Petersburg. On November 1, 1980, the Seaboard Coast Line became part of CSX.

Regularly scheduled passenger rail service on the line ended on February 1, 1984, when Amtrak discontinued its rail services in Pinellas County, choosing to terminate its trains at Tampa Union Station. Substitute Amtrak Thruway service has been provided since then between Tampa Union Station and Pinellas Park. The old SAL passenger stations in Safety Harbor and Oldsmar were demolished in 1965 and 1967, respectively.

=== Recent history ===
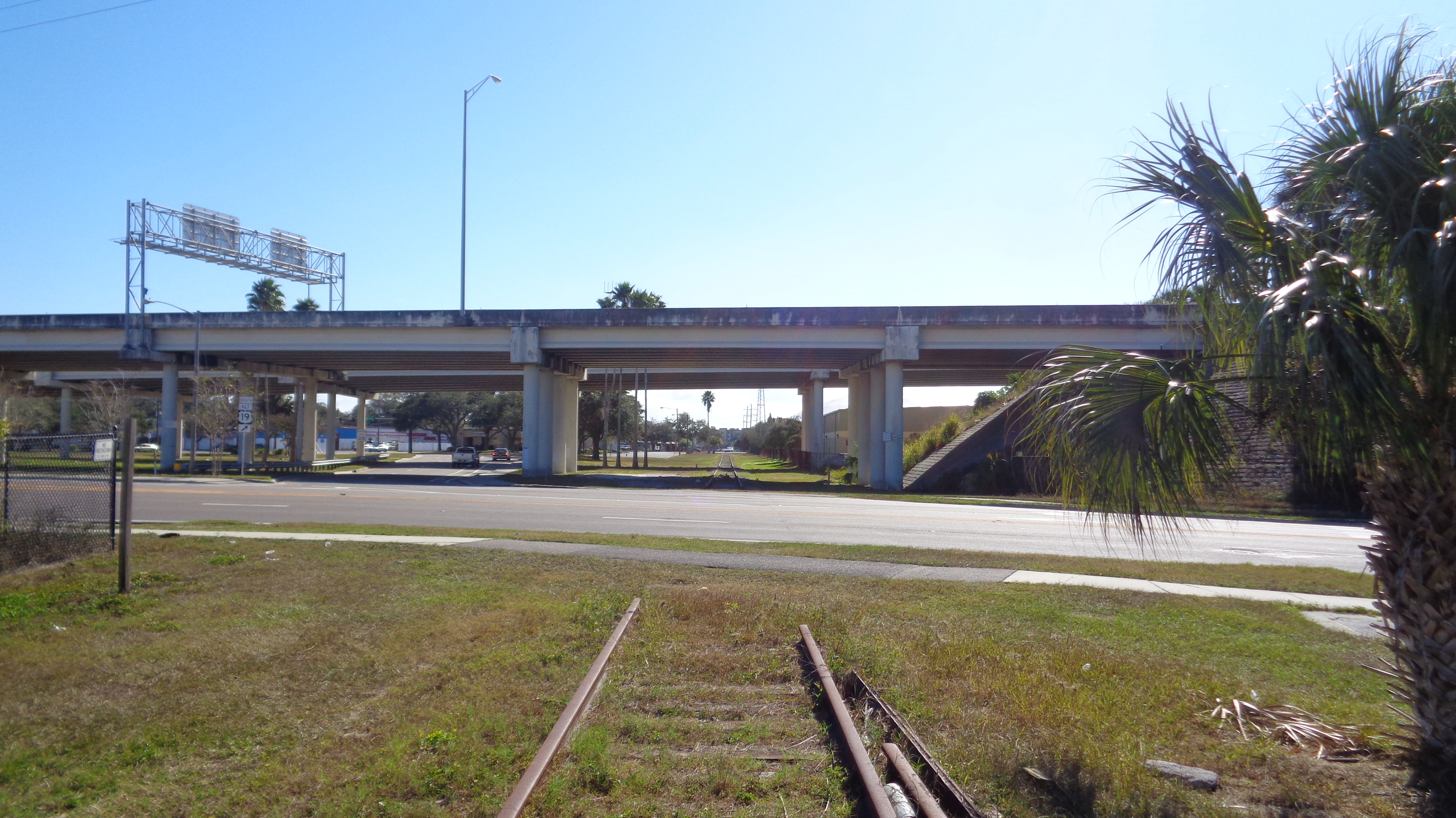
End of the line at 5th Avenue with severed track segment in the distance

In March 2008, the Clearwater Subdivision's trackage in downtown St. Petersburg was pulled up, along with the South Side Spur, which ran south of Central Avenue and east of 34th Street South (part of the former Seaboard line). That right-of-way, as well as the right-of-way of several other former CSX railroad lines in the county beginning in the 1990s, was converted into a section of the Pinellas Trail. Today, the line ends at 5th Avenue North in St. Petersburg. Though, some severed track segments remain between I-375 and Tropicana Field.

== See also ==
- List of CSX Transportation lines
- St. Petersburg station (Amtrak)
- Clearwater station (Amtrak)

== Bibliography ==
- Luisi, Vincent (2010), Railroading in Pinellas County (1st ed.), Arcadia Publishing, ISBN 978-0-7385-8550-5
