= Gary (Tampa) =

- Neighborhood
- Location within the state of Florida
- Coordinates: 27°57′21″N 82°25′41″W
- Country: United States
- State: Florida
- County: Hillsborough
- City: Tampa
- Time zone: UTC-5 (Eastern (EST))
  - Summer (DST): UTC-4 (EDT)

Gary is an industrial section located in the southeastern part of Tampa, Florida, mainly in the vicinity of Adamo Drive east of Downtown Tampa.

== Geography ==
Gary is located at 27.955855 degrees north and 82.4281495 degrees west. The elevation of the area is 25 ft above sea level.

Gary has no official boundaries, however, the USGS has listed the area as a populated place. Other areas in Gary are Palmetto Beach and East Ybor.

== History ==
The Gary post office was established in 1898, but an official plat of "Gary-Town" was not recorded until May 1903. The Gary neighborhood was bounded by 26th Street on the west to 40th Street on the east and included both Gary-Town and Spanish Park, located to its east. The population at this time was a mixture of Anglos, Italians, Spaniards and Cubans. Celery farming played a prominent role in the early years, but the neighborhood's industries also included cigar factories, a citrus packing house, dairies, and a blacksmith shop.

Hendry & Knight Real Estate Co. subdivided the "Celebrated Neyland's Celery Farm Land" in 1903 and sold lots in the new neighborhood. Their advertising was printed in three languages (English, Spanish and Italian) due to the multicultural nature of nearby Tampa and Ybor City. The original boundaries stretched from 11th Avenue in the north to the Atlantic Coast Line railroad tracks just north of Sixth Avenue in south, and from 26th Street and 28th Street on the west and east, respectively.

The City of Gary was incorporated in October 1915. The municipal boundaries at that time were defined as 30th Street on the west to 37th Street on the east and from Wall Street (21st Avenue) on the north to Hillsborough Bay on the south. The state legislature abolished the City of Gary in 1919. Then, in 1923, the City of Tampa extended its boundaries to encompass the former City of Gary.

After World War II, an African American population moved into Gary. In the 1960s, Interstate 4 cut through the neighborhood, destroying many homes.

=== Railroads ===
Several historical railroads had routes through Gary, including the Atlantic Coast Line (SCL), Seaboard Air Line (SAL), and Tampa Northern (TN). Amtrak and CSX both operate trains through Gary today.

Gary has an important wye that was once used for the SAL (as well as its successor, the Seaboard Coast Line (SCL) as a runaround and turning point for passenger trains such as the Silver Meteor and the Floridian to back into Tampa Union Station. It was also used for trains to access the Clearwater subdivision to service stations in Clearwater, Pinellas Park and St Petersburg, Florida. In 1984, Amtrak discontinued its service to Clearwater. Once a busy location of train activity, the area has been reduced to a few local freight trains each day. Amtrak passenger trains still use the former SCL tracks and wye to turn around and back into Tampa Union Station.

Gary was also the location of TN Tower, an interlocking tower built to govern the crossing of the Tampa Northern and Atlantic Coast Line mainlines. It was the last interlocking tower standing in Florida at the time of its demolition in February 2019.

=== The Gary School ===
On July 27, 1904, trustees for the "new Gary school district" met and decided to build a school. It was to be a two-story structure measuring 26 by 50 feet and projected to cost $600. The Gary School was opened in 1910 at 3610 10th Avenue. The building was recognized by the City of Tampa as an historical landmark in 2005, but years of neglect would soon take a toll on the school. It was sold to a developer with plans to renovate it into a sports facility. Part of the roof and one wall collapsed in July 2008, forcing the demolition of the rest of the structure in September of that year.

== Industrial Development ==
Gary's early industrial development, like nearby Ybor City, included several cigar factories. The Tierra del Lago Cigar Co. was originally at 1908 N 36th St. and remained there until 1919. The cigar company then moved to the corner of 18th Street and Pansy Avenue (between 21st and 22nd Avenues), where it remained until late 1926. The building still stands on the corner of Ninth Avenue and 36th Street, where in 2021 plans were made to renovate the site. As of December 2025, renovations were not yet complete.

Large firms that would eventually call Ybor City home also operated in Gary. The Arguelles & Co. firm worked out of a building at Third Avenue and 31st Street; J.D. Greenless had a factory on Eighth Avenue between 36th and 37th Streets; and A. Ramirez & Co. operated a factory on 35th Street.

Two news items from April 1909 showed that growth, and growing pains, were part of everyday life in Gary. Residents inside the city limits agreed to remove fencing "while there are no crops in the ground" from the roadways, opening them up to travel. This move was backed by W.N. Jackson, a "well known real estate dealer and promoter of Gary and Palmetto Beach." While many places in Florida gave the right-of-way to livestock, Gary is unique in doing so for its cash crops.Tampa Bay Times
