= Clearwater station =

Clearwater station may refer to:

- Clearwater station (Amtrak), United States
- Clearwater station (British Columbia), Canada
