= Pinellas Trail =

Rail trail in Pinellas County, Florida, United States

Coordinates: 27°57′32″N 82°47′49″W

Fred Marquis Pinellas Trail
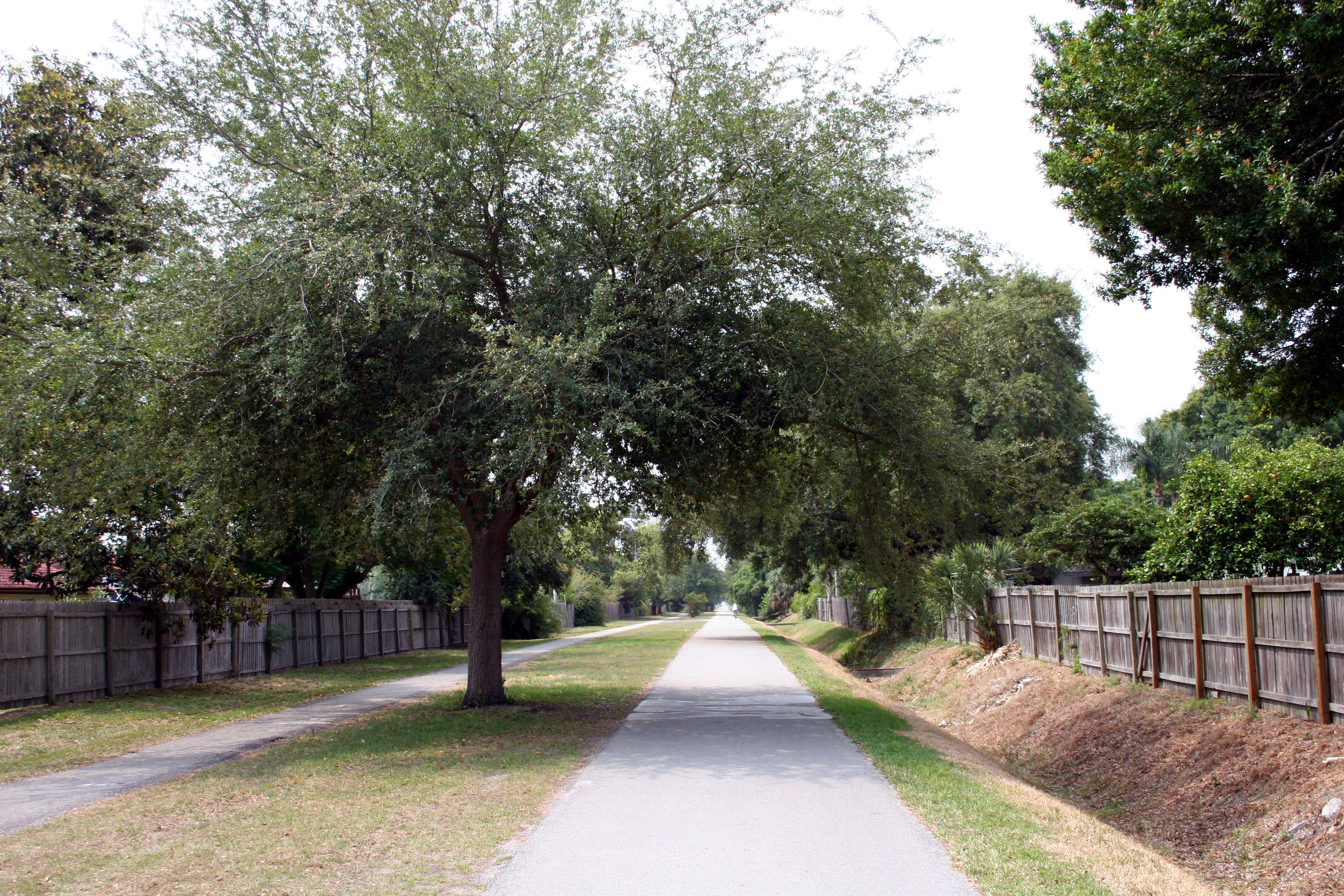
- Section of the Pinellas Trail
- Length: 45 mi (72 km)
- Location: Pinellas County, Florida
- Trailheads: Tarpon Springs; St. Petersburg
- Use: Shared-use for walking and cycling
- Difficulty: Easy to moderate
- Season: Year round
- Hazards: Crime, weather, at-grade pedestrian crossing at vehicular thoroughfares

Trail map
- Pinellas Trail highlighted in green

The Fred Marquis Pinellas Trail is a rail trail in Pinellas County, Florida. It stretches from Tarpon Springs in the north to St. Petersburg in the south, passing through the towns of Palm Harbor, Dunedin, Belleair, Clearwater, Largo, Seminole, South Pasadena, and Gulfport. It is utilized for walking, jogging, and cycling. The Pinellas Trail is named after Fred Marquis, a former Pinellas County Administrator who served from 1979 until 2000.

The distance that the main trail currently covers is 47 miles (76 km).

== History ==
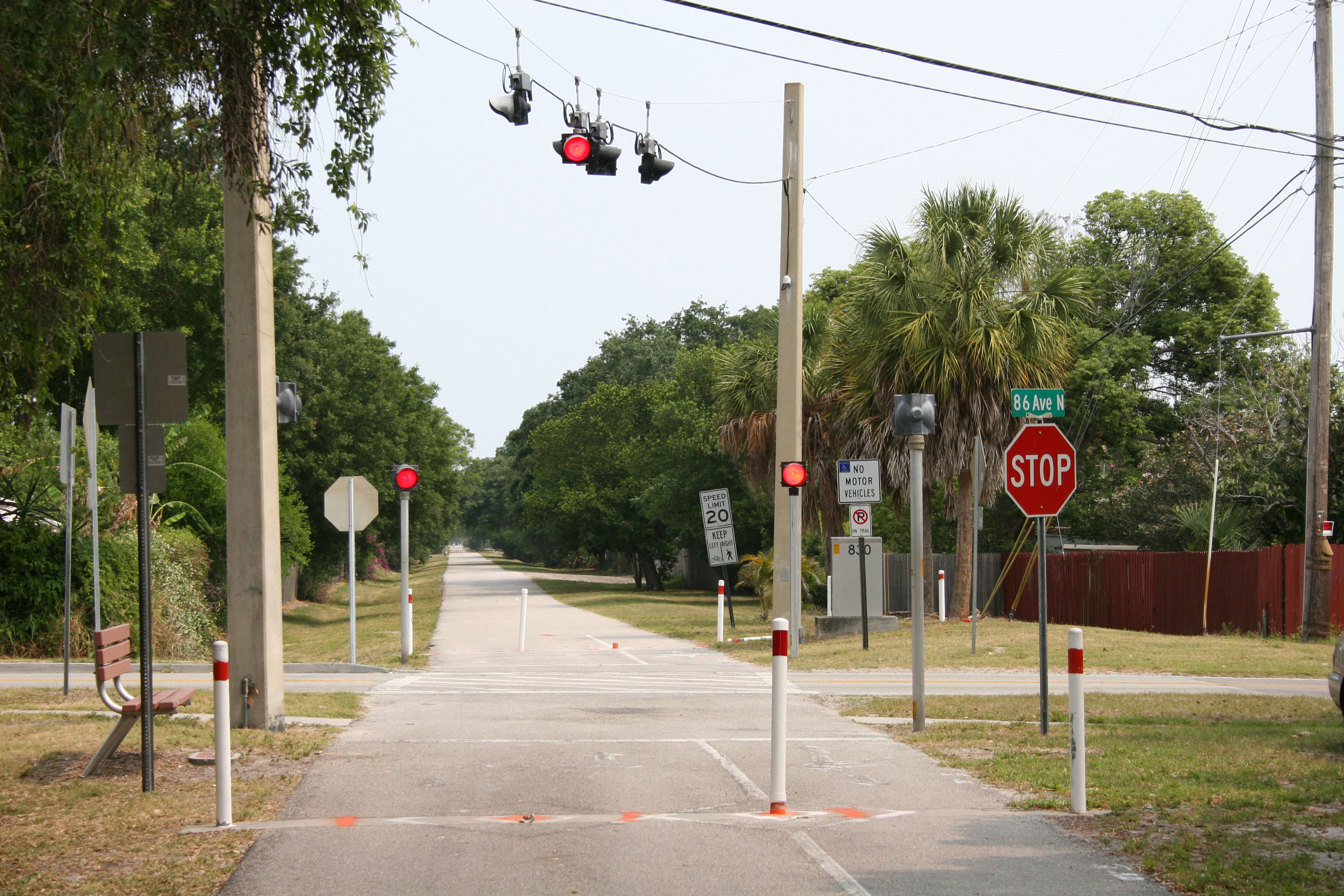
Street crossing with signage

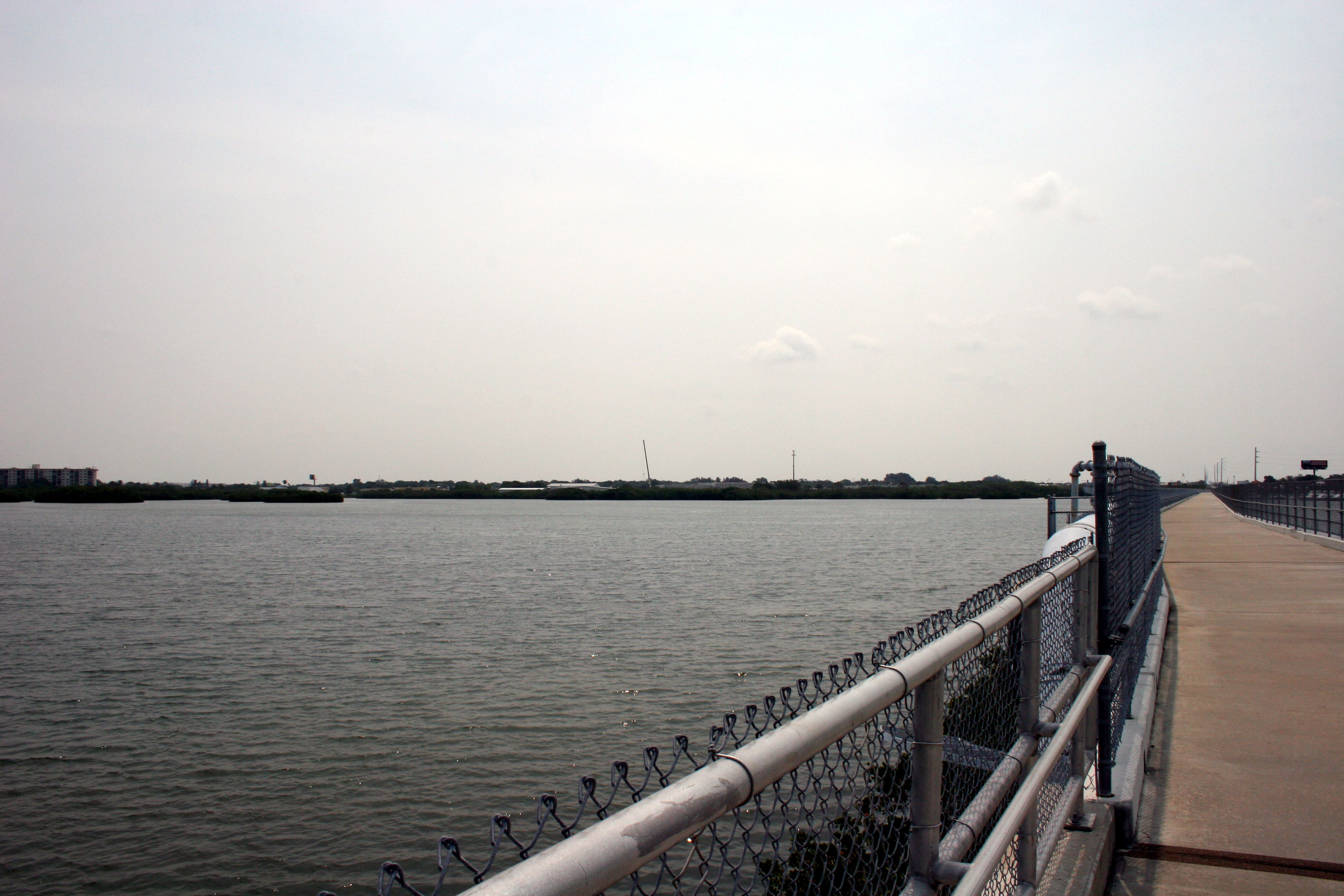
View of Boca Ciega Bay

The Atlantic Coast Line (ACL) and the Seaboard Air Line (SAL) railroads both served St. Petersburg and Clearwater for many years. They merged in 1967 to form the Seaboard Coast Line Railroad (SCL), which consolidated the existing infrastructure. After the SCL joined CSX Transportation in the 1980s, 34 miles (55 km) of trackage in Pinellas County was abandoned, and purchased by the Florida Department of Transportation. After voter approval, the county acquired the property and began construction of the Pinellas Trail.

The first 5 miles (8.0 km) opened in December 1990, linking John S. Taylor Park in Largo to Seminole City Park in Seminole. With the passage of the first Penny for Pinellas one-cent local option sales tax, plans were made to construct additional segments along the former railroad corridor.

The Pinellas Trail is composed of the following railroad segments:

- Former Orange Belt Railway (later Atlantic Coast Line Railroad) from Tarpon Springs to Clearwater
- Former Tampa and Gulf Coast Railroad (later Seaboard Air Line Railroad) from Clearwater to St. Petersburg

== Future ==
As of August 2025, the Pinellas Trail Loop will extend to 75 miles (121 km) in length. As of April 2023, 63 miles (101 km) of the 75 miles (121 km) of the Pinellas Trail Loop (including the Pinellas Trail itself and connecting trails) circling Pinellas County are complete. The connecting trails that will be part of the completed loop include the Duke Energy Trail and the St Petersburg North Bay Trail.

== Hazards ==
The Pinellas Trail travels through several urban areas, different from most rail-trails that traverse rural countryside or forests.

When traveling through some of the neighborhoods in sections of St. Petersburg and Tarpon Springs, trail users are encouraged to be cautious. In Clearwater, the same warning applies; trail users may have the right-of-way in areas with minimal vehicular traffic, but they do not when the trail crosses a major artery such as State Road 60.

== See also ==
- Tarpon Springs Depot
- Dunedin History Museum
- Seaboard Coast Line Railroad station (St. Petersburg, Florida)
- Clearwater Subdivision
