= Waldo station =

Former train station in Waldo, Florida, U.S.

Coordinates: 29.7906°N 82.1666°W

Waldo, FL
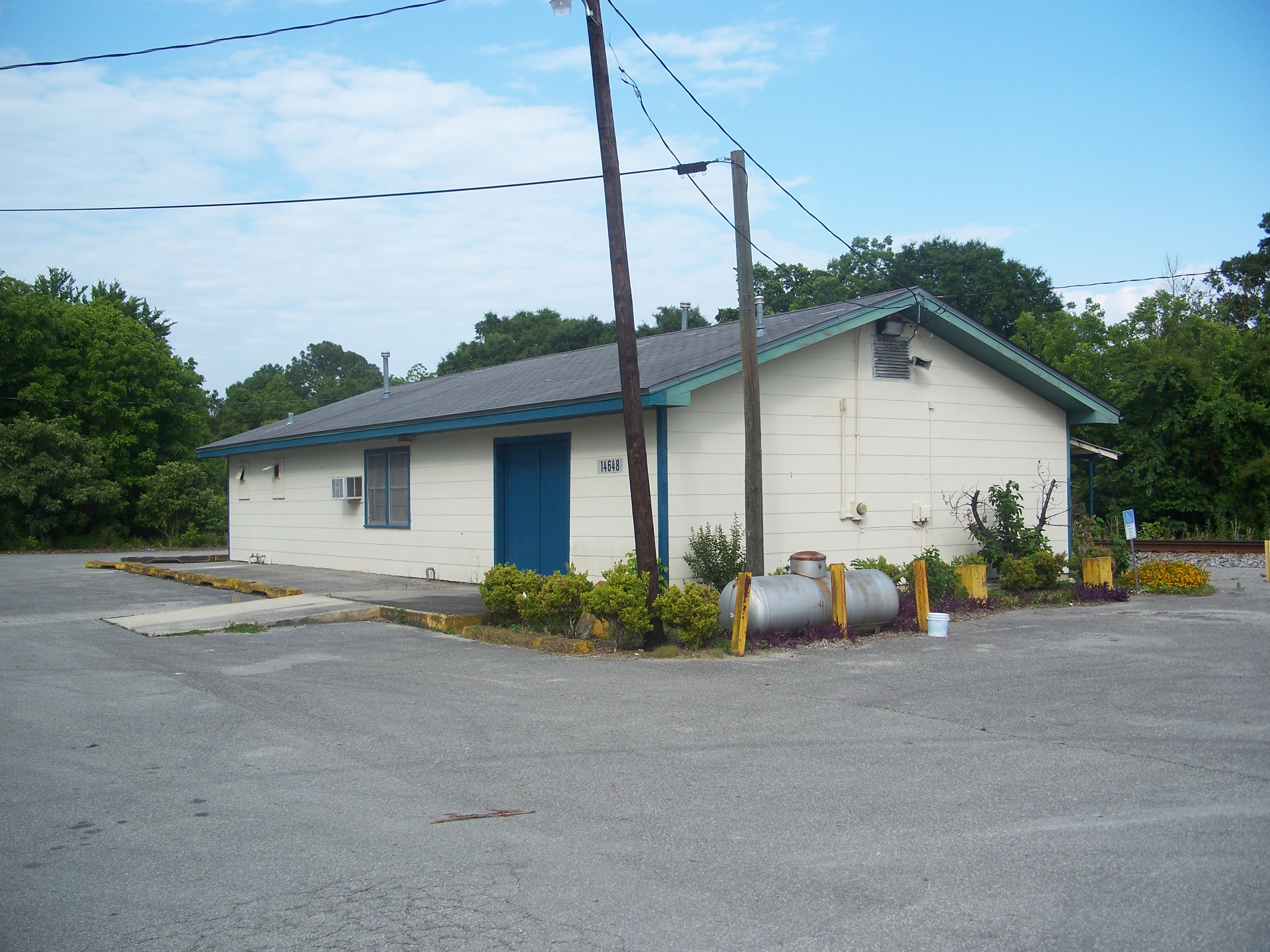

General information
- Location: 14648 Southeast 1st Avenue, Waldo, Florida 32694
- Lines: Amtrak Thruway service to the Silver Meteor and Silver Star

History
- Opened: 1963
- Closed: 2004

Former services
Preceding station	Amtrak	Following station
Ocala toward Miami	Floridian	Jacksonville toward Chicago
Ocala toward Miami	Palmetto (2002–2004)	Jacksonville toward New York
Preceding station	Seaboard Air Line Railroad	Following station
Ocala toward Tampa or Miami	Main Line	Starke toward Richmond
Fairbanks toward Tampa	Brooksville Subdivision	Terminus
Location

Waldo station is a former train station in Waldo, Florida along the CSX S-Line. It serves Amtrak Thruway buses and previously served trains for Amtrak and other rail operators. The station is located at the interchange of US 301 and State Road 24 in Waldo, Florida.

== History ==
The original Waldo train station was built by the Seaboard Air Line Railway as a two-story structure with a large freight room, and was a divisional headquarters. In 1930, the top floor and part of the freight room were removed, and in 1963, the old building was replaced by the current structure. The station served the SAL's mainline in Florida. Trains included the New York City - Miami and St. Petersburg Silver Meteor and Silver Star, which operated in a more limited stop context in Florida, and the trains operating on the same route, Palmland and Sunland.

In 1971, most passenger service in the United States was transferred to Amtrak, and the Silver Meteor retained its stop in Waldo. Throughout the latter part of the 20th century, Amtrak would move trains off and onto the S-Line. Some of these trains include the Silver Meteor, Silver Star, Floridian, and Palmetto. Finally, Amtrak revived the Silver Palm along the CSX S-Line in 1996, where it would keep its name, sleepers, and diner until 2002. In 2002, the train would be renamed back to Palmetto. Two years later, the Palmetto was truncated to Savannah, Georgia on November 1, 2004, prompting Amtrak to revive Silver Star service to Tampa along the CSX A-Line shared by the current Silver Meteor, and part of the suspended Sunset Limited, and finally ending passenger service to Waldo. Today, the station only serves as a stop for Amtrak Thruway bus service between Jacksonville and Lakeland.
