= Lakeland station =

Passenger train station in Lakeland, Florida

Lakeland, FL
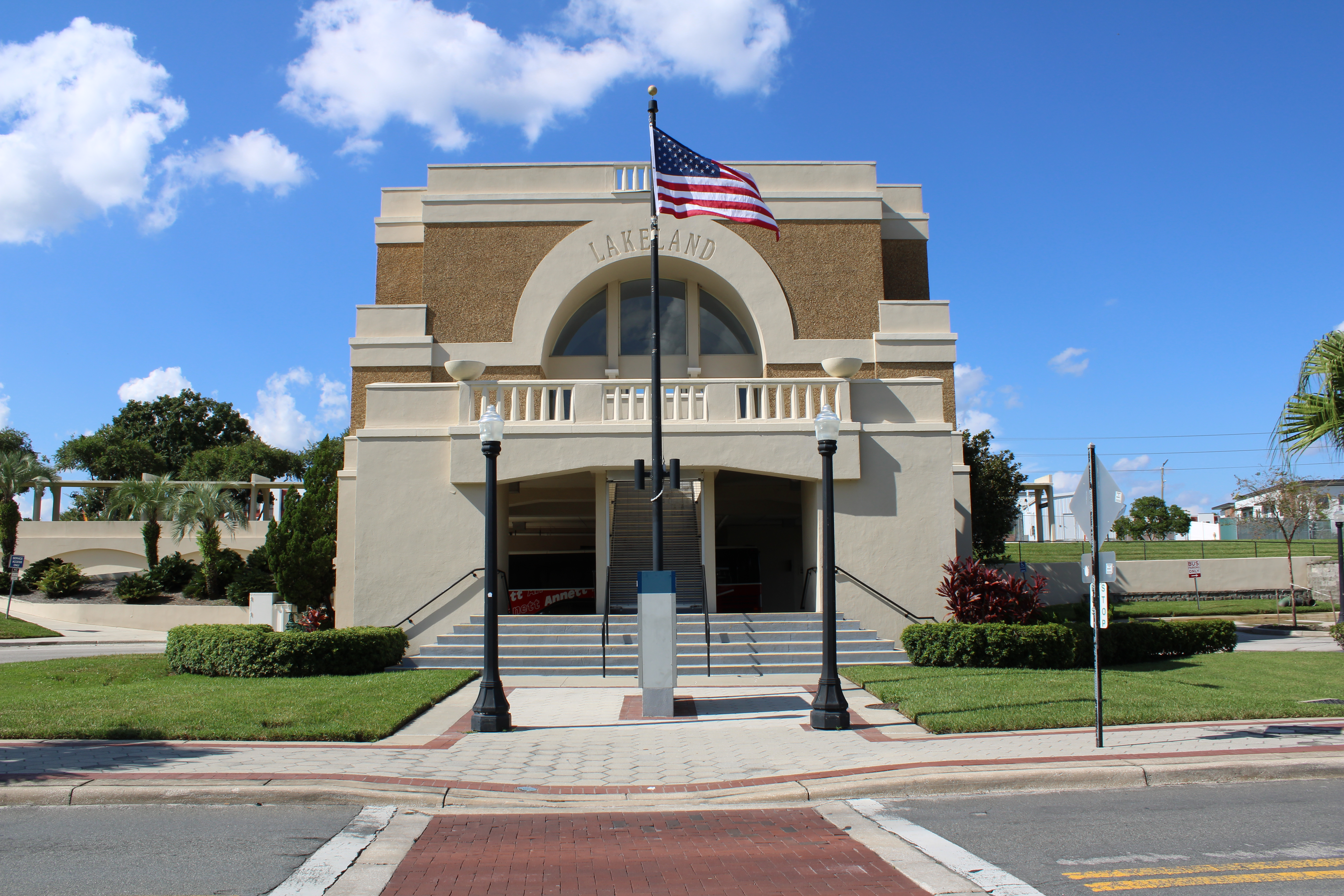
- Lakeland station in 2024

General information
- Location: 600 Lake Mirror Drive; Lakeland, Florida; United States
- Coordinates: 28.04547°N 81.95193°W
- Owner: City of Lakeland
- Platforms: 1 side platform
- Tracks: 1
- Connections: Amtrak Thruway; Citrus Connection; 12, 22XL

Construction
- Parking: 28 short term spaces
- Accessible: Yes

Other information
- Station code: Amtrak: LAK or LKL (Note: The station code LAK is used for arrivals from and departures to points north and the station code LKL is used for arrivals from and departures to points south.)

History
- Opened: 1998

Passengers
- FY 2025: 22,039 (Amtrak)

Services
Preceding station	Amtrak	Following station
Tampa toward Miami or Chicago	Floridian	Kissimmee toward Chicago
Tampa toward Miami or Chicago	Floridian	Winter Haven toward Miami
Former services
Preceding station	Amtrak	Following station
Tampa toward St. Petersburg	Floridian 1971–1979	Kissimmee toward Chicago
Winter Haven toward Miami	Palmetto 2002–2004	Tampa toward New York
Tampa toward Miami or New York	Silver Star until 2024	Kissimmee toward New York
Tampa toward Miami or New York	Silver Star until 2024	Winter Haven toward Miami
Preceding station	Atlantic Coast Line Railroad	Following station
Winston toward Tampa	Main Line	Auburndale toward Richmond
Kathleen toward High Springs	High Springs – Lakeland	Terminus
Terminus	Lakeland – Marco Island	Eaton Park toward Marco Island
Location

Lakeland station is an Amtrak train station in Lakeland, Florida, served by the daily Floridian. The station is located on the northern shore of Lake Mirror. The Floridian doubles back between Auburndale and Tampa to serve Tampa station. Each train serves Lakeland twice – both before and after serving Tampa – so that passengers to/from Lakeland do not have to ride the Tampa portion of the route.

== History ==
The original Lakeland station's structure was opened by the South Florida Railroad in 1886 as a two-story wooden edifice that burned down in 1901. The replacement proved to be inadequate for contemporary railroad needs and was replaced in 1910 by the South Florida Railroad's successor, Atlantic Coast Line Railroad (ACL), with a one-story brick building. This too would be hit by a fire on January 1, 1918 that caused $25,000 worth of damage. The building was given a second story and reopened on January 31, 1919.

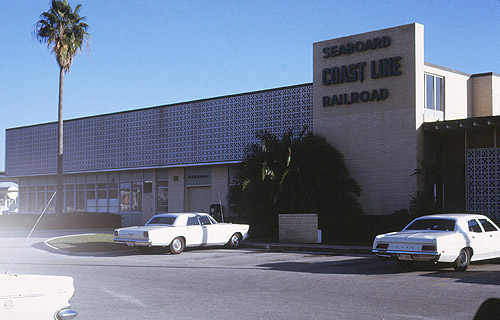
The 1960-built station in 1971

Lakeland was a junction for the ACL's north-south and east-west routes. Named trains making stops in Lakeland included the City of Miami, Dixie Flyer, Flamingo, Floridian, Havana Special, Palmetto, Seminole, South Wind and West Coast Champion. Construction began in November 1959 for a new station, funded by the city, west of the downtown area. It opened on September 1, 1960. The ACL merged with the Seaboard Air Line Railroad (SAL) on July 1, 1967, to become the Seaboard Coast Line Railroad (SCL).

Amtrak took over passenger service in 1971, with the Silver Star serving Lakeland. It was also served by the Champion until 1979 and the Silver Palm from 1982 to 1985. The Silver Star ceased serving Lakeland briefly in 1994–1995 when the Palmetto took over the Tampa branch, and again in 1996 when the Silver Palm did so. The current station was built in 1998 about 1.1 miles (1.8 km) east of the 1960-built station. The Silver Palm (Palmetto after 2002) was cut back in 2004 and stopped serving Lakeland; the Silver Star resumed serving Lakeland.

On April 15, 2009, a decomposed female body was discovered by a passenger waiting for a late-running train. The body was identified as 34-year-old Shawn Hazel Turk; in August 2011, Reginald Riggins was arrested in connection with her death. Riggins was later convicted of murdering of Turk and was sentenced to 25 years in prison.

On November 10, 2024, the Silver Star was merged with the Capitol Limited as the Floridian.
