= Tampa Northern Railroad =

Railway line in Florida

- Interactive map of the historic Tampa Northern Railroad main line (red) and the Tooke Lake Branch (dark red)

Overview
- Reporting mark: TN
- Dates of operation: 1908–1913
- Successor: Seaboard Air Line Railroad; Seaboard Coast Line Railroad; CSX Transportation

Technical
- Track gauge: 4 ft 8 1/2 in (1,435 mm) standard gauge

The Tampa Northern Railroad was a historic railroad line running from just east of downtown Tampa north to the city of Brooksville in Hernando County. The line continues to operate today and is under the ownership of the CSX Corporation, who operates it as their Brooksville Subdivision north of Sulphur Springs and part of their Clearwater Subdivision south of there.

== Route description ==
The Tampa Northern Railroad began just southeast of downtown Tampa at Hooker's Point, where it had its own terminal facilities. From there it proceeded north, crossing the main lines of both the Seaboard Air Line Railroad and Atlantic Coast Line Railroad in Gary, just east of Ybor City. Continuing north, the line goes through Sulpher Springs, Lutz, Land o' Lakes, and Masaryktown and into Brooksville.

== History ==
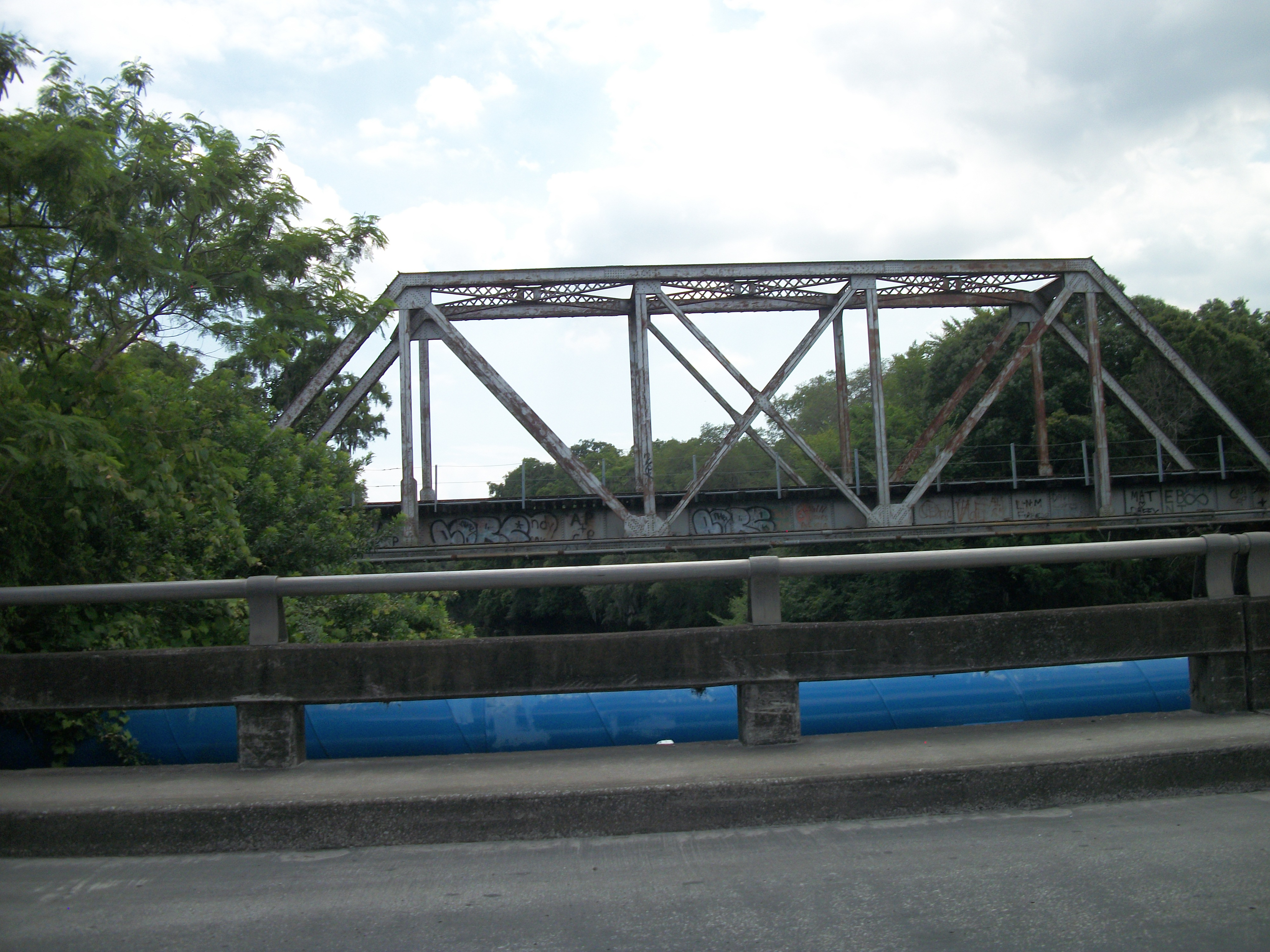
Bridge over Hillsborough River near Sulphur Springs

The Tampa Northern Railroad began as a small logging railroad known as the Brooksville and Hudson Railroad. The Brooksville and Hudson Railroad was built in 1902 and was initially owned by Aripeka Sawmills Inc. This line went from Brooksville south to what would become Fivay Junction (near the present-day intersection of US 41 and SR 52) then west to Hudson. A line also had a branch from just south of Brooksville northwest to Tooke Lake.

The Tampa Northern Railroad company was incorporated on April 7, 1906 by Henry M. Atkinson of Atlanta. Atkinson intended to build a railroad from Tampa to Thomasville, Georgia to connect with his Atlanta, Birmingham & Atlantic Railroad, which would create a direct rail route between Tampa and Atlanta, which never happened. In 1907, the Tampa Northern Railroad bought the Brooksville and Hudson Railroad. New track was built from Tampa to Fivay Junction and the company rebuilt the Brooksville and Hudson Railroad from there to Brooksville. The line was completed in 1908. In Brooksville, the Tampa Northern connected to the Atlantic Coast Line Railroad's Brooksville Branch from Pemberton Ferry (known today as Croom). The branch to Tooke Lake was abandoned in 1930.

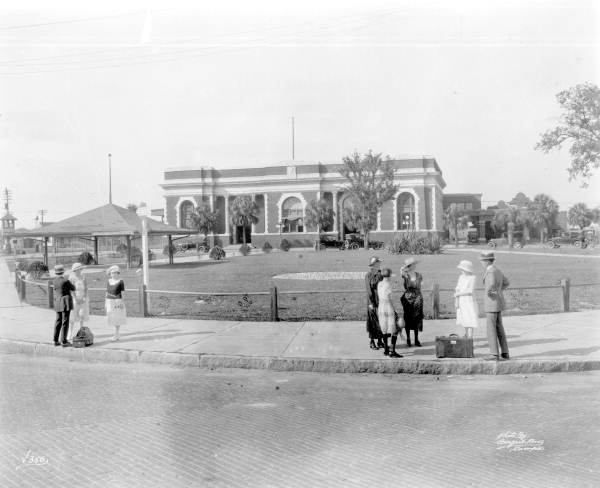
Tampa Northern Railroad was one of the three original users of Tampa Union Station

The Tampa Northern Railroad was one of three railroad that served Tampa Union Station when it was first built in 1912, along with the Atlantic Coast Line Railroad and the Seaboard Air Line Railroad. The Tampa Northern was bought out by Seaboard later that year. In 1925, the Brooksville and Inverness Railway, a Seaboard subsidiary, extended the line north from Brooksville to Inverness where it connected to the Seaboard's branch from Waldo and Archer. This would create an additional route from Tampa to the Seaboard main line in northern Florida. The Seaboard would renumber the mileposts north of Sulphur Springs in accordance with the extension north, which was numbered north to south. This resulted in the Tampa Northern's current milepost numbers which increase north from Tampa to Sulphur Springs, and then decrease from Sulphur Springs north.

Today, the line ends just north of Brooksville near the former Broco quarry. Track north of this point was abandoned in the 1970s.

=== TN Tower ===
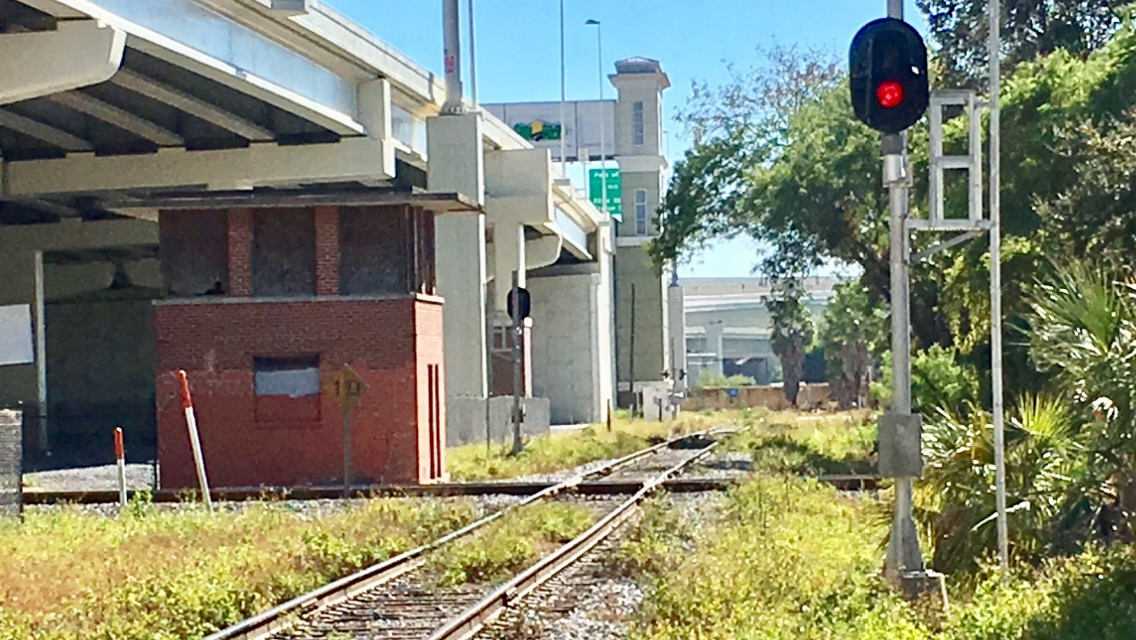
TN Tower just east of Ybor City as seen before its demolition in 2019

One of the most notable remnants of the Tampa Northern Railroad was TN Tower. TN Tower was an interlocking tower built to govern the crossing of the Tampa Northern Railroad and the Atlantic Coast Line Railroad mainline (now the CSX A Line) at 27°57′34″N 82°25′35″W. The most recent tower was built in 1959 replacing an earlier wooden tower. TN Tower was taken out of service around 1984 after Amtrak Tampa - St. Petersburg service was discontinued and Centralized traffic control signals were installed to protect the crossing. The tower was subsequently abandoned but remained standing until February 2019, when it was demolished. It was the last interlocking tower standing in Florida at the time of its demolition. Despite removal, the control point governing the crossing today is still known as "TN", a reference to TN Tower and the Tampa Northern Railroad.

== Current Operations ==
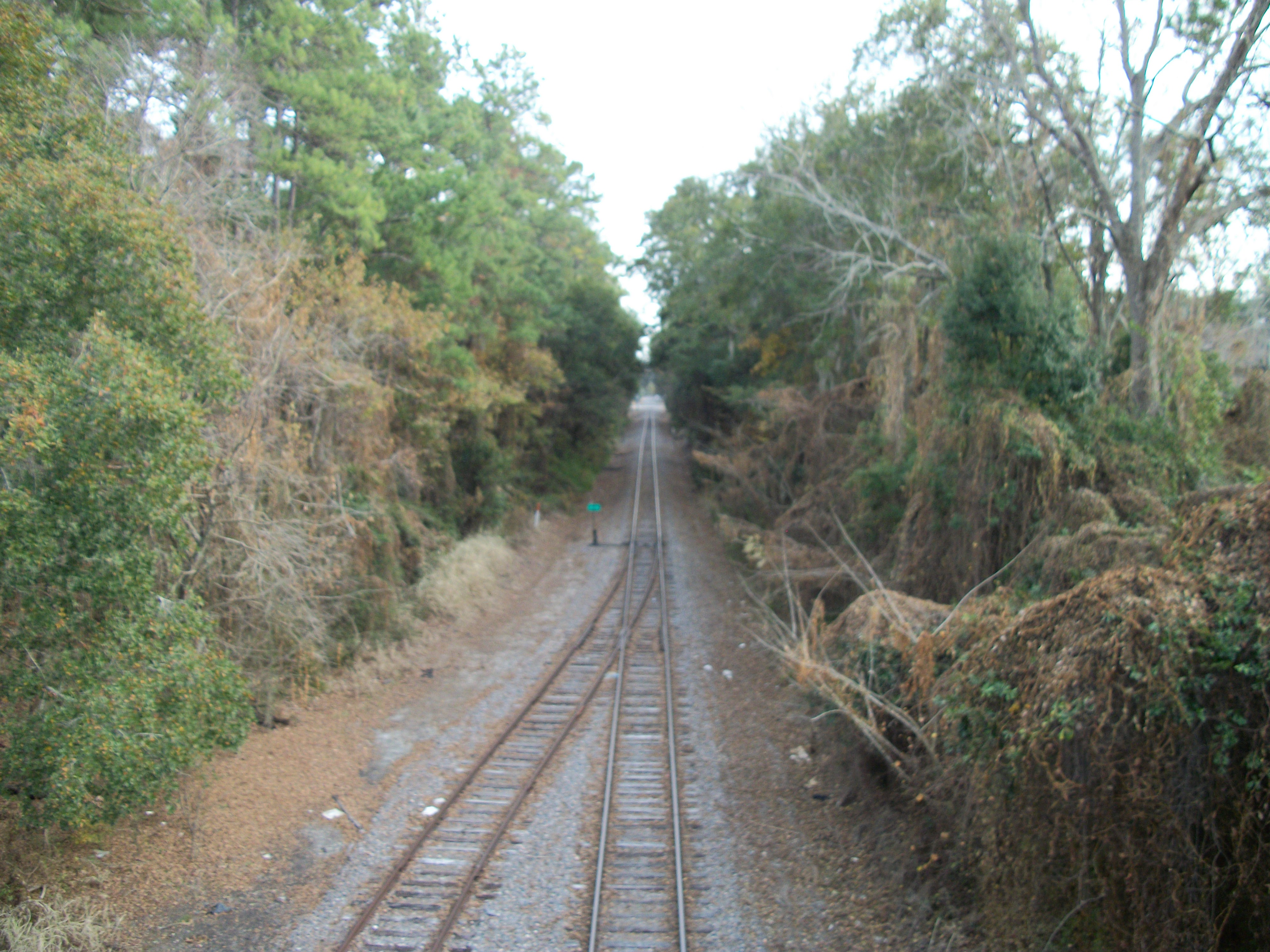
Former Tampa Northern Railroad (CSX Brooksville Subdivision) in 2010 as seen from Broad Street Overpass in Brooksville

Both Seaboard and the Atlantic Coast Line are today part of CSX Transportation, who continues to operate the former Tampa Northern line. It is CSX's Brooksville Subdivision from Sulphur Springs to the northern terminus in Brooksville. From Sulphur Springs south to Downtown Tampa, it is CSX's Clearwater Subdivision, which also continues west from Sulphur Springs to Clearwater and St. Petersburg along the former Tampa and Gulf Coast Railroad. The spur south to Hooker's Point is today discontinuous from the rest of the Tampa Northern Line, but is part of CSX's Tampa Terminal Subdivision and is known as the Hooker's Point Lead. The control point at the crossing of the Clearwater Subdivision with the A Line in Gary is still referred to by CSX as "TN", a reference to the Tampa Northern Railroad.

In 2015, CSX proposed to sell both the Clearwater and Brooksville subdivisions (which would include the entire former Tampa Northern line) to the Florida Department of Transportation for potential use as commuter rail. FDOT is currently studying this possibility. Similar transactions between FDOT and CSX have taken place in the Miami and Orlando areas for tracks that today run the Tri-Rail and SunRail commuter lines respectively.

== Historic stations ==
Tampa to Brooksville
Miles from Tampa	City/Location	Station	Connections and notes
0.0	Tampa	Tampa Union Station	located on Seaboard Air Line Railroad Main Line
2.6	Tampa	Gary	junction with: Atlantic Coast Line Railroad Main Line; Seaboard Air Line Railroad Main Line
5.1	Tampa	Sulphur Springs	also known as Gulf Coast Junction junction with Tampa and Gulf Coast Railroad (SAL)
5.3		Parker	
10.1		Flora	
11.1	Nowatney	Nowatney	
15.3		Bruing	
16.3	Lutz	Lutz	junction with Tampa and Gulf Coast Railroad
17.8	Lutz	Deer Lake	
19.3	Land O' Lakes	Denham	
22.7	Land O' Lakes	Drexel	junction with Atlantic Coast Line Railroad Trilby–St. Petersburg Line
29.2		Fivay Junction	
34.0		Loyce	
39.1	Masaryktown	Masaryktown	
39.7	Masaryktown	Ayers	
43.3	Garden Grove	Powell	
45.1		Garrison	
47.2		Salil	
47.6	South Brooksville	Tooke Lake Junction	junction with Tooke Lake Branch
48.6	Brooksville	Brooksville	junction with Atlantic Coast Line Railroad Brooksville Branch

Tooke Lake Branch
Milepost	City/Location	Station	Connections and notes
47.6	South Brooksville	Tooke Lake Junction	junction with main route
53.0	Wiscon	Wiscon	
55.0		Norman	
62.0		Tooke Lake	
