= Rocky Creek, Florida =

Unincorporated community in Florida, US

- Unincorporated community
- Location within the state of Florida Rocky Creek (the United States)
- Coordinates: 28°0′15″N 82°34′47″W
- Country: United States
- State: Florida
- County: Hillsborough
- Time zone: UTC-5 (Eastern (EST))
  - Summer (DST): UTC-4 (EDT)

Rocky Creek is an unincorporated community in Hillsborough County, Florida, United States. Although a separate community, it is a part of the census-designated place (CDP) of Town 'n' Country. The ZIP code for the community is 33615.

== Geography ==
Rocky Creek is located at 28° 0' 15" north, 82° 34' 47" west (28.004, -82.57972); or approximately eight miles northwest of Tampa. The elevation for the community is three feet above sea level.

== Education ==
The community of Rocky Creek is served by Hillsborough County Schools.

== See also ==
- Unincorporated communities in Florida
