= St. Petersburg station (Seaboard Coast Line Railroad) =

Former train station in St. Petersburg, Florida

Coordinates: 27°46′01″N 082°39′46″W

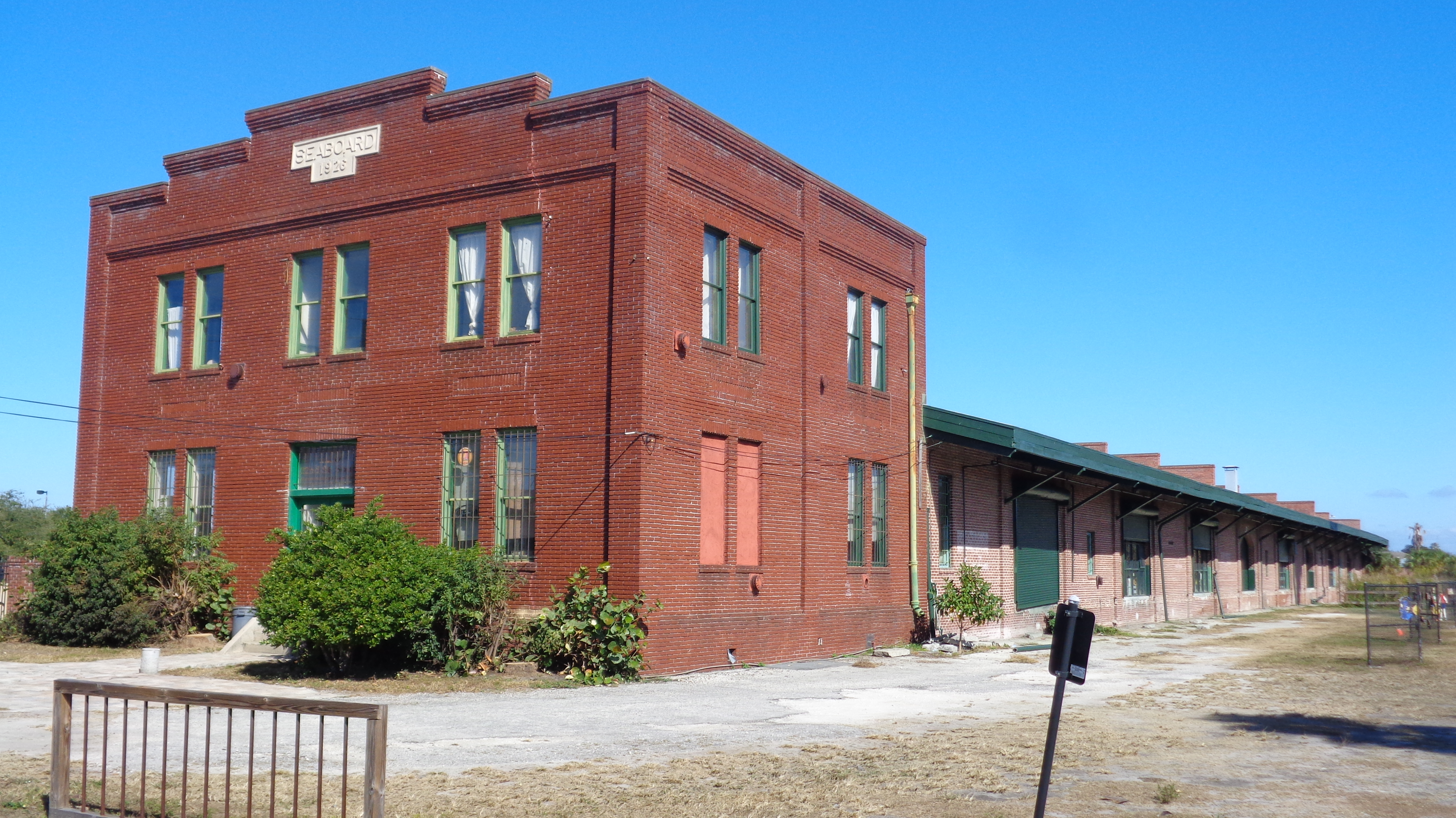
The station building in 2016.

St. Petersburg is a former freight railway station in St. Petersburg, Florida, which has been designated by the city of St. Petersburg as a local landmark. The structure is located at 420 22nd Street South.

== History ==
The station was constructed in 1926 by the Tampa and Gulf Coast Railroad, the second railway line to enter St. Petersburg and an affiliate of the Seaboard Air Line Railroad (SAL). The office building and warehouse are built of brick in masonry vernacular style and are the city's only substantially unaltered example of railroad architecture. The line and building became fully integrated with the SAL system in 1927, and the building continued in use as a freight depot for that company until 1967. Among the SAL passenger trains from the Northeast and the Midwest were the west coast branch of the Orange Blossom Special (winter only), the Silver Meteor (both from New York), the Florida Sunbeam (winter only; from Detroit and Cleveland). In 1967 SAL merged with Atlantic Coast Line Railroad (ACL), forming the Seaboard Coast Line Railroad and the depot was closed.

=== Seaboard Confusion ===
In the years since, the building has come to be referred to as the "Seaboard Coast Line Railroad station" despite the fact that it never operated as such, and ignoring the existence of another area structure which did.

The 1926 Seaboard Train Station should not be confused with the three other St. Petersburg depots which operated under one of the Seaboard brands. Seaboard Air Line passenger service operated out of two stations, the first of which was built in 1915. A replacement SAL Passenger Station was built in 1959 at 34th Street South and Fairfield Avenue South. Its railroad career ended after less than a decade of service as it too was closed following the 1967 merger of SAL and ACL. Its ACL counterpart had just been built in 1963, so it was at that station where Seaboard Coast Line consolidated their passenger operations. The former St. Petersburg ACL Station is the only one in the city that operated as an actual Seaboard Coast Line station, albeit only for a few years, as it would begin service under Amtrak in 1971.

== Post-railroad Use ==
Following its closure by the railroad, the 1926 station came into use by a variety of different businesses. The year 2000 saw the start of a two-year renovation of the building, at a cost of over $1 million. Today, it is occupied by the Morean Center for Clay, which rents studio space to ceramics artists, offers classes and workshops, operates a sales gallery and has a unique event space.

== See also ==
- St. Petersburg station (Amtrak)
