= Brooksville Subdivision =

Railway line in Florida

CSX Transportation's Brooksville Subdivision is a railroad line in the Tampa Bay region of Florida. Today, the line runs from the Clearwater Subdivision in Sulphur Springs, Florida north to a point just north of Brooksville, a distance of 49.1 miles. Historically, the Brooksville Subdivision was owned and operated by CSX predecessor, the Seaboard Air Line Railroad. Under Seaboard ownership, the Brooksville Subdivision continued north as far as Waldo.

== Route description ==
The Brooksville Subdivision begins in Sulpher Springs just 5 miles north of Tampa. It branches off of the Clearwater Subdivision, which continues south to Downtown Tampa and west to Clearwater and St. Petersburg.

From Sulphur Springs, the Brooksville Subdivision runs north paralleling U.S. Route 41, passing through Lutz, Land o' Lakes, and Masaryktown to Brooksville. The Brooksville Subdivision terminates near the Broco Quarry, less than two miles north of Brooksville.

Historically, the Brooksville Subdivision continued north from Brooksville through Inverness, Dunnellon, and Williston to Archer. In Archer, it turned northeast and passed through Gainesville to its historic northern terminus in Waldo, where it connected to what is now CSX’s S Line.

== Operation ==
Currently, the Brooksville Subdivision is only used for local freight trains with various customers along the line. It notably serves a Florida Crushed Stone Company facility in Brooksville along with a Cemex facility.

== History ==
Brooksville Subdivision

Overview
- Owner: Seaboard Air Line Railroad
- Termini: Waldo, Florida; Sulphur Springs, Florida

Technical
- Line length: 148.1 mi (238.3 km)
- Track gauge: 1,435 mm (4 ft 8 1/2 in) standard gauge
- Electrification: No
Route map
Brooksville Subdivision at its greatest extent (click to enlarge)

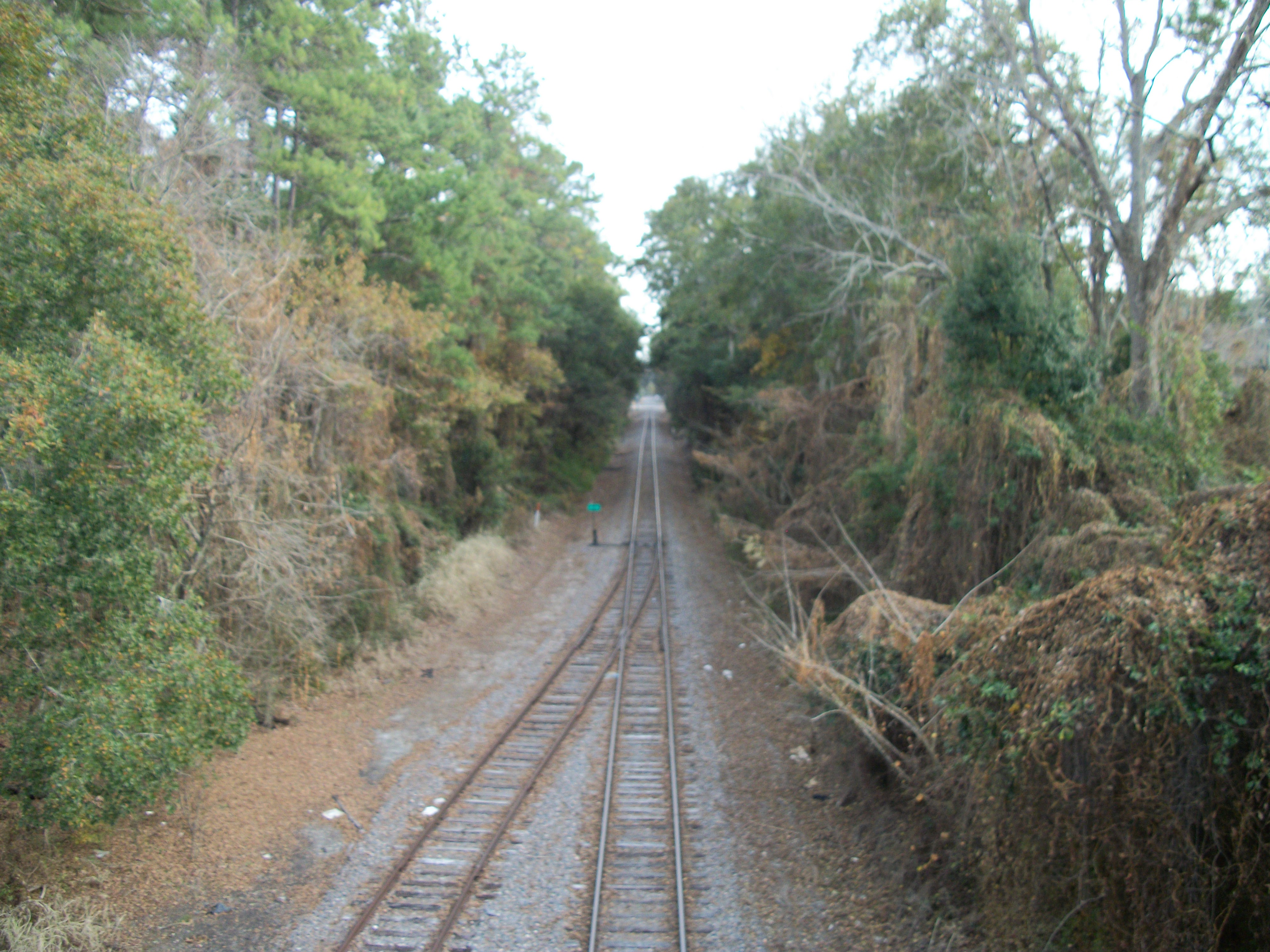
Brooksville Subdivision as seen from Broad Street Overpass in Brooksville

=== Sulphur Springs to Brooksville ===
The line from Brooksville south to Fivay Junction (near the present-day intersection of US 41 and SR 52) was originally built by the Brooksville and Hudson Railroad in 1902. The Brooksville and Hudson Railroad was a logging railroad owned by the Aripeka Sawmills Inc.

In 1907, the Brooksville and Hudson Railroad was bought by the Tampa Northern Railroad. The Tampa Northern then built the track from Tampa to Fivay and rebuilt the Brooksville and Hudson Railroad from there to Brooksville. The line was completed in 1908. The Tampa Northern Railroad was bought by the Seaboard Air Line Railroad in 1912.

=== Brooksville to Waldo ===
At its greatest extent, the Brooksville Subdivision extended as far north as Waldo. Track from Waldo to Archer (which continued southwest to Cedar Key) was built in 1861 by the Florida Railroad. The Florida Railroad later became part of the Florida Central and Peninsular Railroad (FC&P) network. In 1890, the FC&P built track from Archer south to Early Bird as a branch track. The Seaboard Air Line bought the FC&P network in 1900, with track from Waldo to Cedar Key becoming their Cedar Key Branch. In 1911, track was extended south of Early Bird to Inverness. The extension from Early Bird to Inverness ran closely parallel the Atlantic Coast Line Railroad's High Springs–Lakeland Line.

In 1925, the Brooksville and Inverness Railway, a Seaboard subsidiary, was built connecting Inverness with the former Tampa Northern Railroad in Brooksville. This would create an additional freight route from northern Florida to the Tampa Bay region as an alternative to the Seaboard main line. Around the same time, track from Inverness to Waldo was upgraded with heavier rail, and the Seaboard main line was double-tracked from Starke (just north of Waldo) north to Baldwin which further increased capacity.

When complete in 1925, the line was designated as the Brooksville Subdivision from Waldo to Sulphur Springs and the remaining track from Archer to Cedar Key was designated as the Cedar Key Subdivision. By the end of 1926, the Seaboard Air Line was running at least three freight trains a day to Tampa on the Brooksville Subdivision. This included a daily mail train, the Manatee River Special freight train, and an additional through freight train. An additional local freight train also ran the line six days a week. Local passenger service between Waldo and Cedar Key was also running the Brooksville Subdivision north of Archer at the time.

The Cedar Key Subdivision was abandoned in 1932. By 1940, the Seaboard was running a daily through freight train round-trip on the line.

=== Later years ===
The Seaboard Air Line became the Seaboard Coast Line Railroad in 1967 after merging with their former rival, the Atlantic Coast Line Railroad. The line initially remained intact after the merger. The Seaboard Coast Line abandoned the Brooksville Subdivision between Waldo and Brooksville in the 1970s (which nearly restored the Tampa Northern Railroad's original terminus ironically) as it was largely redundant as a through route due to the Atlantic Coast Line Railroad's nearly parallel route as well as its own main line to Tampa. The line now ends near the Broco Quarry just north of Brooksville. Despite the abandonment, the line's SR mileposts numbers remain as they did when the full line was intact.

In 1980, the Seaboard Coast Line's parent company merged with the Chessie System, creating the CSX Corporation. The CSX Corporation initially operated the Chessie and Seaboard Systems separately until 1986, when they were merged into CSX Transportation.

== Historic Seaboard Air Line stations ==
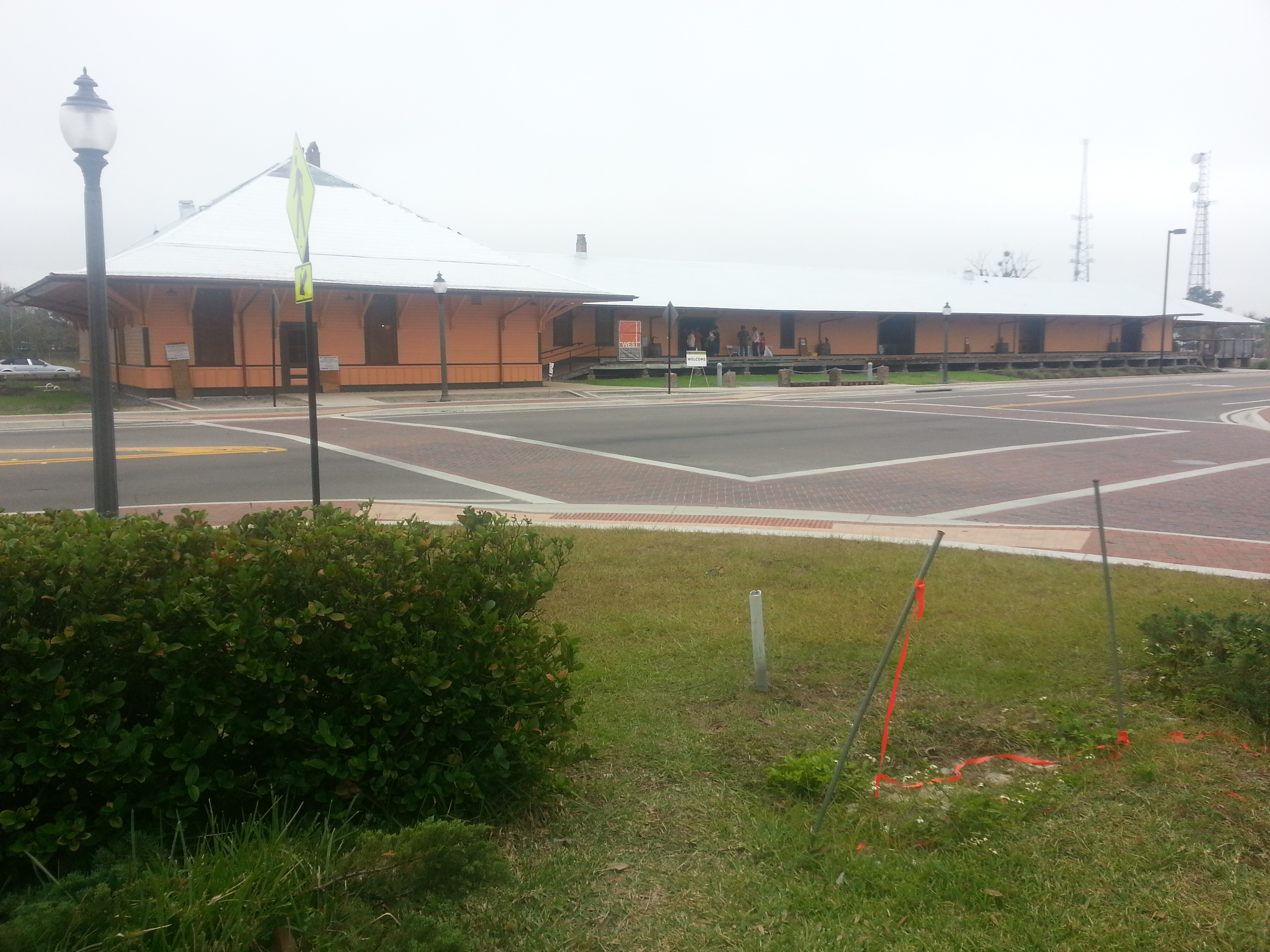
Former Gainesville depot

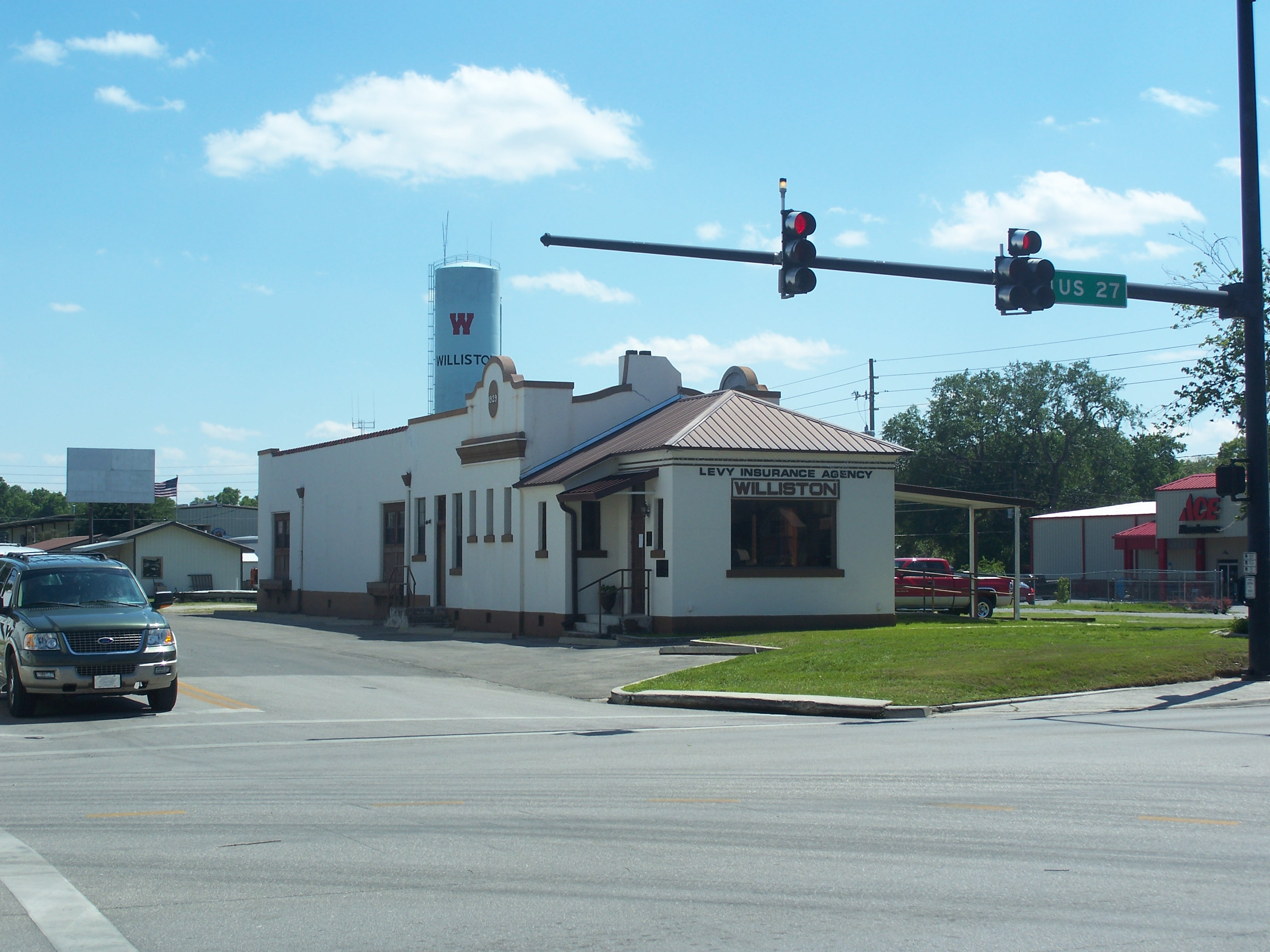
Former Williston SAL depot

Waldo to Sulphur Springs
Milepost (Note: The Seaboard Air Line assigned the prefix R to the milepost numbers on its line from Waldo to Cedar Key when it took over the line. The prefix RA was assigned to the branch from Archer to Early Bird and on to Sulphur Springs at the time. When the Cedar Key Subdivision was abandoned in 1932, the R prefix was reassigned to remaining track from Waldo to Sulphur Springs. After the merger of the Seaboard Air Line with the Atlantic Coast Line in 1967, S was added to the beginning of all Seaboard Air Line milepost prefixes to differentiate them from the Atlantic Coast Line's routes. This made the prefix SR as it is today.)	City/Location	Station	Connections and notes
SR 690.2	Waldo	Waldo	junction with Main Line
SR 697.2		Fairbanks	
SR 701.9		Nedra	
SR 704.0	Gainesville	Gainesville	junction with: Gainesville and Gulf Railway (SAL); Atlantic Coast Line Railroad High Springs—Croom Line
SR 710.8		Kanapaha	
SR 718.4	Archer	Archer	junction with Atlantic Coast Line Railroad DuPont—Lakeland Line
SR 718.5	Archer	Cedar Key Junction	junction with Cedar Key Subdivision
SR 719.7		Eve	
SR 726.2		Raleigh	
SR 730.1	Williston	Williston	
SR 734.5		Montbrook	junction with Atlantic Coast Line Railroad DuPont—Lakeland Line
SR 737.9	Morriston	Morriston	
SR 745.0	Early Bird	Early Bird	
SR 749.6		Hoyt	
SR 758.7	Dunnellon	Dunnellon	junction with Atlantic Coast Line Railroad Ocala Branch
SR 765.5		Harrison	
SR 768.9		Felecia	junction with Atlantic Coast Line Railroad DuPont—Lakeland Line
SR 774.3		Johnsons	
SR 775.8	Inverness	Inverness	
SR 782.6		Landrum	
SR 788.3	Lake Lindsey	Lake Lindsay	
SR 791.7		Lake Stafford	
SR 797.8	Brooksville	Brooksville	junction with Atlantic Coast Line Railroad Brooksville Branch
SR 806.6		Ayers	
SR 807.3	Masaryktown	Masaryktown	
SR 812.2		Loyce	
SR 817.0		Fivay	
SR 823.5		Drexel	junction with Atlantic Coast Line Railroad Trilby—St. Petersburg Line
SR 826.9		Denham	
SR 829.8	Lutz	Lutz	
SR 838.3	Sulphur Springs	Sulphur Springs	originally Gulf Coast Junction junction with Tampa Subdivision

Cedar Key Subdivision
Milepost	City/Location	Station	Connections and notes
R 718.5	Archer	Cedar Key Junction	junction with Brooksville Subdivision
R 722.2		Venables	
R 724.7		Meredith	
R 727.8	Bronson	Bronson	
R 733.9		Lennon	
R 739.6	Otter Creek	Otter Creek	junction with Atlantic Coast Line Railroad Thomasville—Dunnellon Line
R 741.3		Ellzey	
R 749.0		Wylly	
R 750.8	Rosewood	Rosewood	
R 753.3	Sumner	Sumner	
R 760.7	Cedar Key	Cedar Key	

== See also ==
- List of CSX Transportation lines
- Main Line (Seaboard Air Line Railroad)
- Clearwater Subdivision
