= Lake Fern, Florida =

Unincorporated community in Florida, US

- Unincorporated community
- Location within Florida Location within the United States
- Coordinates: 28°8′58″N 82°34′47″W
- Country: United States
- State: Florida
- County: Hillsborough
- Time zone: UTC-5 (Eastern (EST))
  - Summer (DST): UTC-4 (EDT)

Lake Fern is an unincorporated community in Hillsborough County, Florida, United States. Although a separate community, it is a part of the census-designated place (CDP) of Keystone. The ZIP code for the community is 33556. In 2000, it was part of the Citrus Park-Fern Lake [sic] census county division (CCD), which recorded an estimate population of 117,574 in 2007.

== Geography ==
Lake Fern is located at 28.14944 degrees north, 82.57972 degrees west (28.14944, -82.57972), and 62 feet above sea level.

== Education ==
The community of Lake Fern is served by Hillsborough County Public Schools.
