= Clearwater station (Amtrak) =

Railway station in Clearwater, Florida, United States

Clearwater, FL
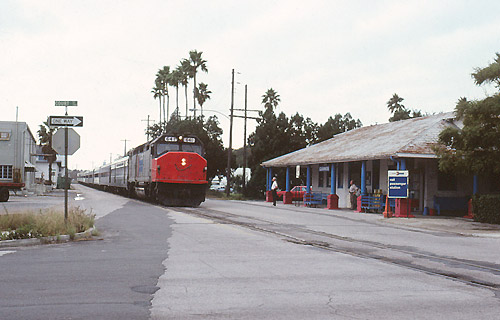
- The northbound Floridian at Clearwater in 1979

General information
- Location: 657 Court Street, Clearwater, Florida 33516; USA
- Coordinates: 27.9617°N 82.7970°W
- Elevation: 25 ft (7.6 m)
- System: inter-city rail station
- Line: Clearwater Subdivision
- Tracks: 1

Other information
- Station code: CLW

History
- Opened: 1922
- Closed: 1984 (rail); 1995 (Amtrak Thruway)

Former services
Preceding station	Amtrak	Following station
St. Petersburg Terminus	Silver Star	Tampa toward New York
St. Petersburg Terminus	Silver Meteor	Tampa toward New York
St. Petersburg Terminus	Floridian	Tampa toward Chicago
Preceding station	Seaboard Air Line Railroad	Following station
Belleair toward St. Petersburg	Tampa and Gulf Coast Railroad	Coachman toward Sulphur Springs
Location

Clearwater station was an Amtrak train station in Clearwater, Florida, served by the Floridian (from Chicago) until 1979 and the Silver Service (from New York City) until February 1, 1984 (when all rail service to and from St. Petersburg was terminated). Thereafter, it continued to be used for Amtrak Thruway motor coach service until 1995, connecting to Amtrak Silver Service trains at Tampa Union Station.

The station was originally built by the Seaboard Air Line Railroad (SAL) in 1922. From the 1920s to the 1960s, it was served by daily long-distance SAL passenger trains, such as the Seabreeze Rail Special in the early 1930s and later the Silver Meteor and Silver Star between New York City and St. Petersburg. Following the SAL-Atlantic Coast Line Railroad (ACL) merger on July 1, 1967, the combined Seaboard Coast Line (SCL) closed the nearby ACL station in Clearwater, consolidating passenger service at the former SAL station. The SCL also ran the Champion through the station after the merger. Rail passenger train service at Clearwater began operating under Amtrak auspices on May 1, 1971, using SCL's tracks, which became the CSX Clearwater Subdivision on November 1, 1980.

The former Seaboard Air Line Railroad station was turned into a hot dog shop. The hot dog shop was demolished in 2003 and soon after the 7-Eleven was built.
