= Tampa Union Station =

Amtrak station in Tampa, Florida

Tampa, FL
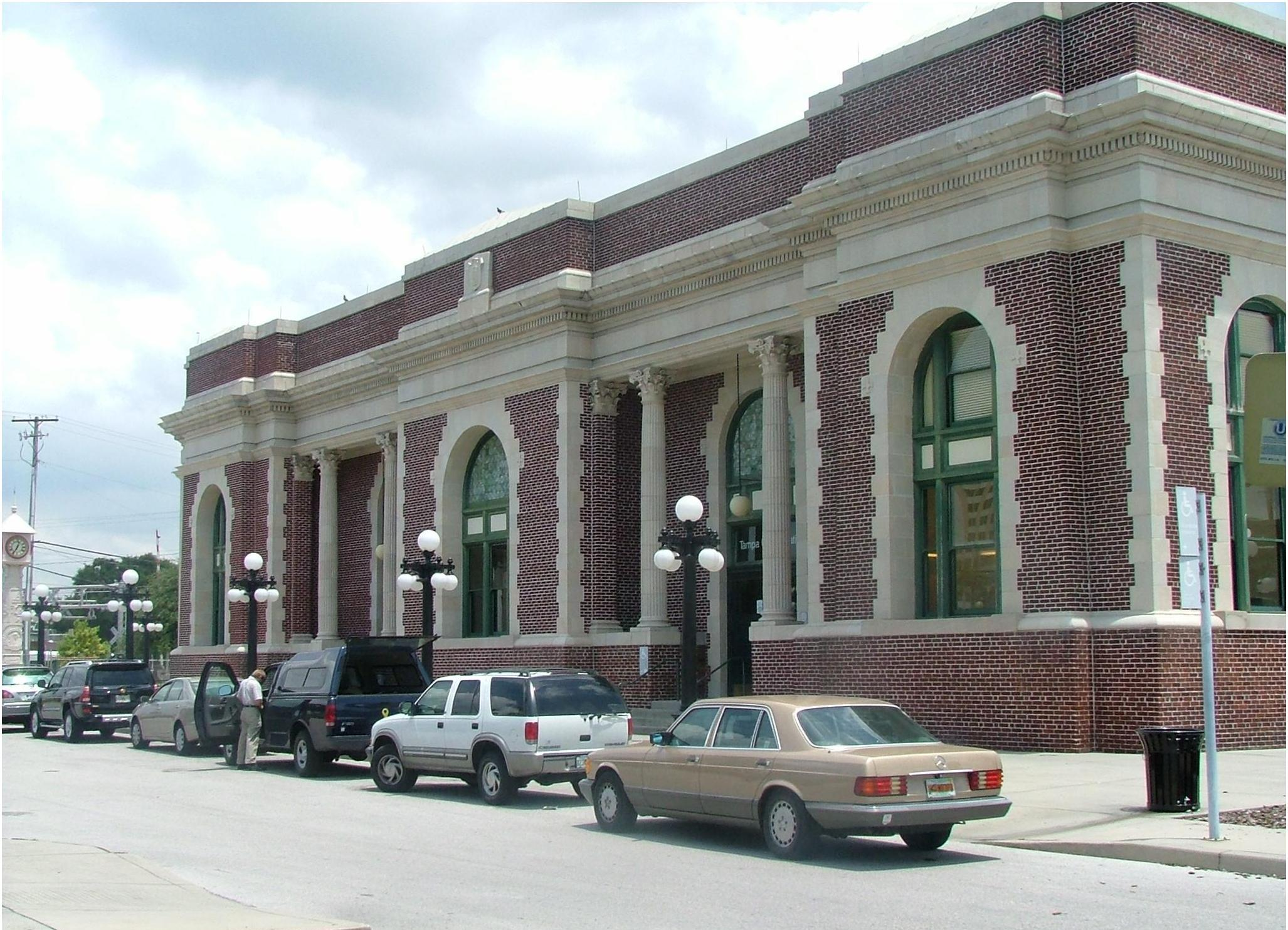

General information
- Location: 601 Nebraska Avenue (SR 45); Tampa, Florida; United States
- Coordinates: 27°57′8″N 82°27′4″W
- Owner: City of Tampa
- Platforms: 3 island platforms
- Tracks: 6
- Connections: Amtrak Thruway; HART: MetroRapid 400, Route 9

Construction
- Cycle facilities: Yes
- Accessible: Yes

Other information
- Station code: Amtrak: TPA

History
- Opened: 1912
- Rebuilt: 1998

Passengers
- FY 2025: 145,295 (Amtrak)

Services
Preceding station	Amtrak	Following station
Reverses direction	Floridian	Lakeland toward Miami or Chicago
Former services
Preceding station	Amtrak	Following station
Clearwater toward St. Petersburg	Floridian	Lakeland toward Chicago
Lakeland toward Miami	Palmetto (2002-2004)	Dade City toward New York
Reverses direction	Silver Star	Lakeland toward Miami or New York
Preceding station	Atlantic Coast Line Railroad	Following station
Terminus	Main Line	Ybor City toward Richmond
Terminus	Tampa and Thonotosassa Railroad	Thonotosassa Junction toward Richland
Terminus	Tampa Southern Railroad	Uceta toward Southfort
Preceding station	Seaboard Air Line Railroad	Following station
Terminus	Main Line	Gary toward Richmond
Terminus	Brooksville Subdivision	Gary toward Waldo
- Union Railroad Station
- U.S. National Register of Historic Places
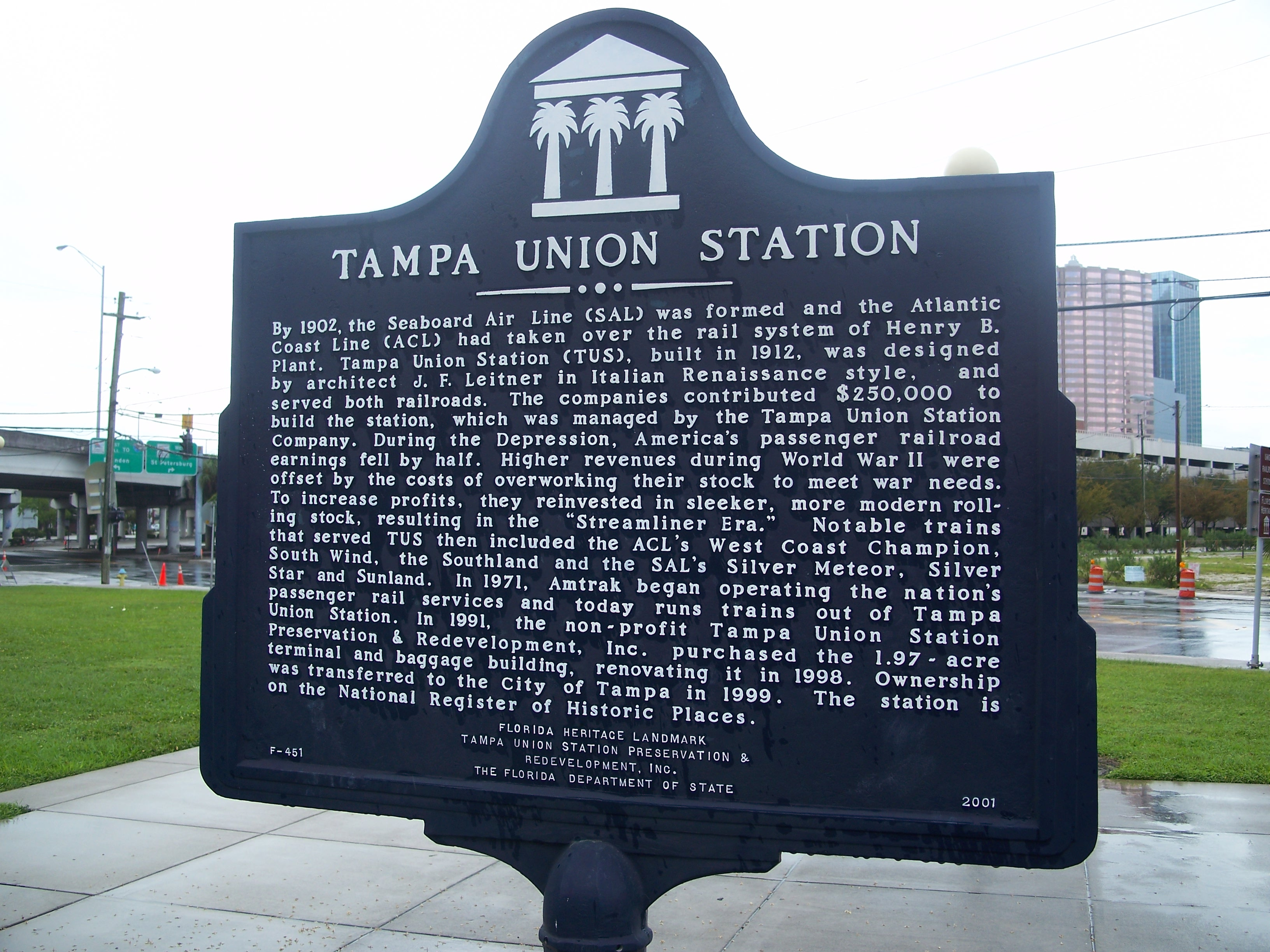
- Historic plaque
- Interactive map of Union Railroad Station
- Built: 1912
- Architects: J.F. Leitner, W.C. Hobbs Company
- Architectural style: Italian Renaissance Revival
- NRHP reference No.: 74000640
- Added to NRHP: June 5, 1974
Route map
Location

Tampa Union Station is an Amtrak train station in Tampa, Florida. The station is located at 601 North Nebraska Avenue (SR 45). Built in 1912, it was added to the National Register of Historic Places in 1974 as Union Railroad Station The station building was closed in 1984 and reopened in 1998 after restoration. The station is served by the daily Floridian.

== Design ==
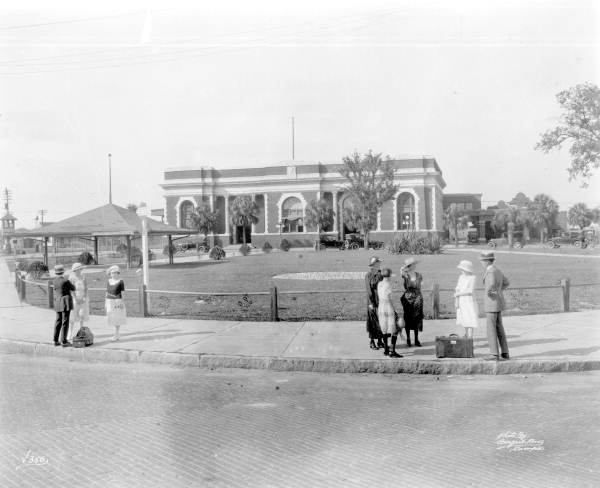
Union Station in 1922

The station was originally built with eight tracks, although only one is in regular use today (designated as "Track 3"), with adjacent Track 2 also available for use by trains as needed. Amtrak added a new, 1,000-foot (305 m) high-level platform and canopy to Track 3 to improve accessibility, which opened in November 2020. The construction of the new platform resulted in changes to track configurations at the station. Tracks 4, 5, and 6 were removed to facilitate the construction of the high-level platform, although there are plans to restore them in the future if demand warrants. Although some of the other tracks remain in place, they are out of service. Original track bumpers, constructed of poured concrete, are still located at the ends of several of the remaining tracks and at the ends of former tracks. Adjacent to each of these bumpers are concrete planters which have "TUS" cast into them.

Union Station consists of the main building which includes the waiting room, as well as an attached restaurant and baggage building. A detached express building located adjacent to the baggage building handled packages and freight transfers from trains to trucks (all structures remain on site with the exception of the express building, which was demolished in the 1970s).

At its opening, Union Station's waiting room was segregated (during the Jim Crow era, a wall across the center of the waiting room divided "white" and "colored" passengers, with separate entrances for each). Segregation remained a common practice in railroad stations in the South until it was stricken down by the Interstate Commerce Commission as a result of NAACP v. St. Louis-San Francisco Railway Company in 1955. However, like many train stations in the South, Tampa Union Station remained segregated to an extent even after the Interstate Commerce Commission's order. Passengers of intrastate trains were still bound by Jim Crow laws. During January 1956, the Tampa Times photographed signage at Union Station wherein the word "Intrastate" had been added beneath the old signage above the entrance to the so-called "colored" side of the waiting room. Full desegregation would not come until later. In fact, the Florida statute providing for segregation on railroads remained a law on the books as late as 1967, although by then the practice had fallen into disuse.

A train wash and car repair facility are also on the property. Both of these elements were added by Amtrak in the 1980s when Amtrak formerly maintained a Tampa maintenance base. However, both are largely unused today.

The City of Tampa's Real Estate Division manages Tampa Union Station for the city. The Division has leased portions of the facility to private tenants, including a second floor office once occupied by the Pullman Company. Part of the former baggage building — which once housed the station's restaurant — is leased to a local real estate firm. Another portion of the baggage building (including the baggage storage and scale area) was leased to art gallery Flight 19 from 2004 to 2008.

== History ==
It was designed by Joseph F. Leitner and was opened on May 15, 1912, by the Tampa Union Station Company. Its original purpose was to combine passenger operations for the Atlantic Coast Line, the Seaboard Air Line and the Tampa Northern Railroad at a single site.

After its condition deteriorated substantially, Tampa Union Station was closed in 1984; Amtrak passengers used a temporary prefabricated station building (nicknamed an "Amshack") located adjacent to the station platforms after the building was closed. In 1988, it received local landmark status from the City of Tampa.

=== Restoration ===
Tampa Union Station was acquired in 1991 by the nonprofit Tampa Union Station Preservation & Redevelopment Inc. (TUSP&R) via a mortgage held by CSX, the freight railroad company which was the corporate descendant of its original railroad owners. TUSP&R raised over US$4 million for the building's restoration through grants and loans from sources including the Florida Department of Transportation (ISTEA funds), the City of Tampa (grant funds) and the National Trust for Historic Preservation (no interest loan). At the completion of the restoration by Rowe Architects Incorporated in 1998, the station reopened to Amtrak passengers and the public. CSX donated the station to the City of Tampa that same year.

During the course of the restoration, numerous abandoned documents from the Pullman Company, Tampa Union Station Company, and the Seaboard Air Line Railroad were discovered in the station. TUSP&R volunteers sorted these documents and preserved them by archiving them at the University of South Florida Library (USF) Special Collections Department and (in the case of the Pullman Company materials), the Newberry Library in Chicago.

In September 2008, a permanent endowment for the care and upkeep of Tampa Union Station was established at the Community Foundation of Tampa Bay by a group of private donors. Income from the endowment goes to the City of Tampa to assist with the maintenance of the facility. A nonprofit called Friends of Tampa Union Station was founded that year.

On November 10, 2024, the Silver Star was merged with the Capitol Limited as the Floridian.
