= St. Petersburg station (Amtrak) =

Passenger train station in St. Petersburg, Florida

St. Petersburg, FL
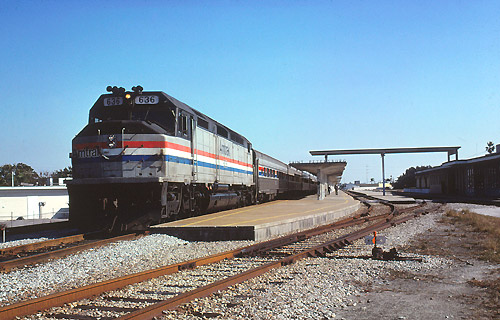
- The Silver Star at the station in 1982

General information
- Location: 3601 31st Street North; St. Petersburg, Florida; United States
- Coordinates: 27.805354°N 82.675897°W
- Owner: CSX Transportation
- Line: Clearwater Subdivision
- Platforms: 1 side platform
- Tracks: 1

History
- Opened: 1963
- Closed: February 1, 1984

Former services
Preceding station	Amtrak	Following station
Terminus	Silver Star	Clearwater toward New York
Terminus	Silver Meteor	Clearwater toward New York
Terminus	Floridian	Clearwater toward Chicago
Preceding station	Atlantic Coast Line Railroad	Following station
Terminus	Ocala District	Clearwater toward Jacksonville
Terminus	Orange Belt Railway	Pinellas Park toward Sanford
Location

St. Petersburg station was a passenger train station in St. Petersburg, Florida. Located northwest of downtown, its former address was 3601 31st Street North, though access to the site is now only from 37th Avenue North.

== History ==
=== Atlantic Coast Line ===
The station was built in 1963 by the Atlantic Coast Line Railroad, and was the third station in the city's history built to serve Atlantic Coast Line passenger trains. It replaced a 1913 downtown St. Petersburg facility, at 2nd Avenue South and 9th Street, following the city's request that rail service be relocated away from the downtown area. The first station in St. Petersburg, built by the Orange Belt Railway shortly after its arrival in 1888, was located on 1st Avenue South where Priatek Plaza now stands. Major long distance trains that served the station included west coast sections of the Champion which originated in New York City, the City of Miami (originating from Chicago) the South Wind (originating from Chicago) and the Southland (originating from Chicago). Each of these (excepting the Southland) ran as a combined section from Jacksonville, Florida.

=== Seaboard Coast Line ===
By 1968, the station's operations came under the banner of the Seaboard Coast Line Railroad, formed by the merger of Atlantic Coast Line with rival company Seaboard Air Line Railroad. The two formerly independent passenger operations were consolidated at this location, resulting in the closure of St. Petersburg's Seaboard Air Line Station.

=== Amtrak ===
The station's service under Seaboard Coast Line continued until 1971, when Amtrak assumed operation of most of the nation's passenger rail service. Assigned station code STP, the St. Petersburg Amtrak station was serviced by trains such as the Champion, Floridian, Silver Star, and Silver Meteor. On February 1, 1984, passenger rail service to St. Petersburg came to an end following the discontinuation of all Amtrak rail services in Pinellas County. Operations continued from the St. Petersburg station for Amtrak Thruway bus service, linking passengers to rail connections in Tampa and Orlando. The station served as a boarding location for the bus service until the 1990s, when the station was closed.

=== Current status ===
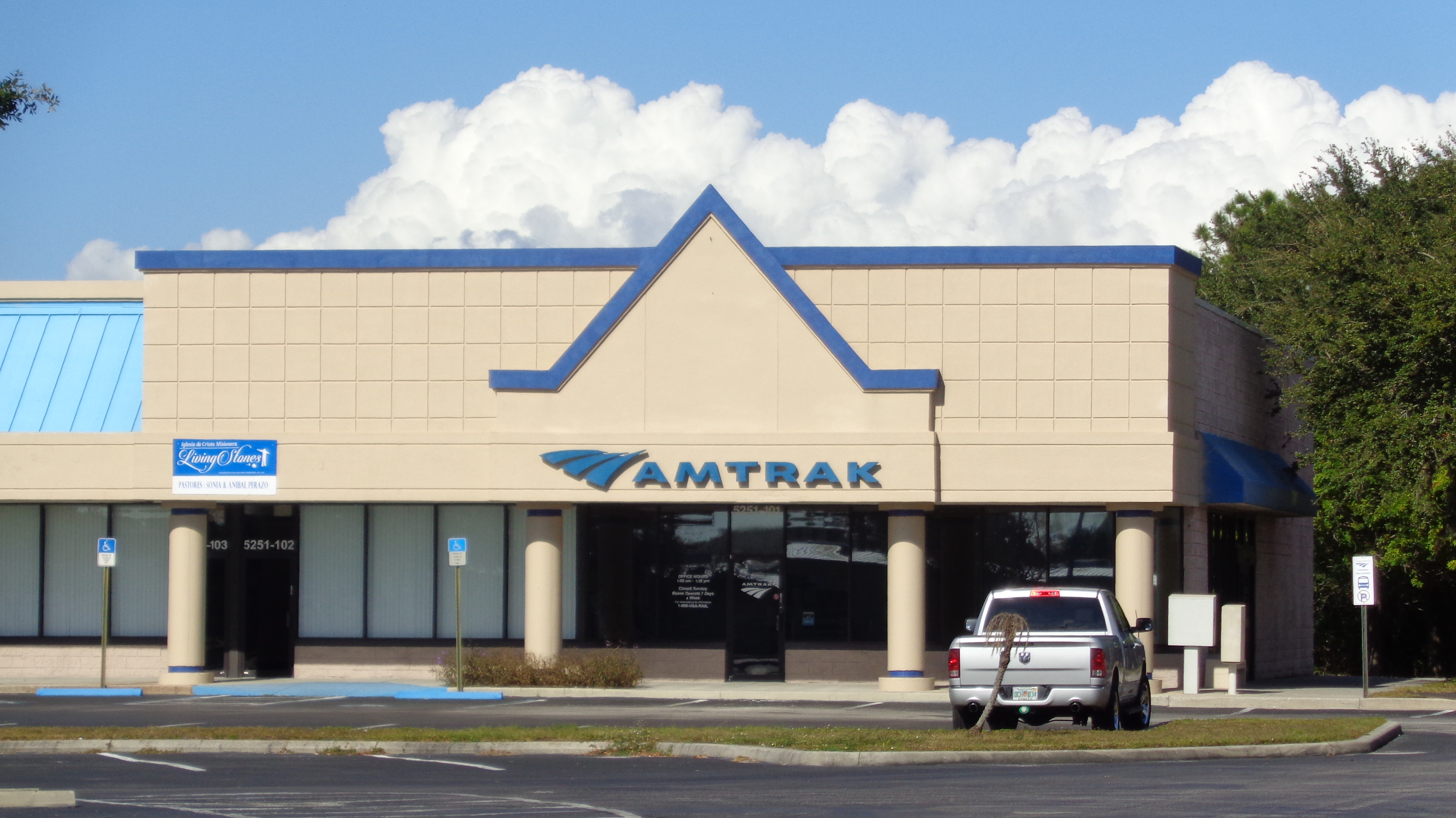
The former Amtrak bus station in a shopping center in Pinellas Park, Florida, in 2016.

After its usage as a train station ended, the former St. Petersburg station was renovated for use by a pharmaceutical company. The trackside awning that covered the platform, along with the block lettering "Saint Petersburg" were removed and disposed of in an early 2008 effort to "commercialize" the property. All traces of the property's link to rail history were removed, save for a slight concrete rise on the South end of the tracks where the edge of the platform once stood, and the secondary platforms, which served as picnic and storage areas. As of 2016, the station building is unoccupied and for sale.

Amtrak continues to offer Amtrak Thruway service for St. Petersburg and all of Pinellas County through a station located in Pinellas Park, Florida. The Clearwater-St. Petersburg Amtrak Station retains the STP Amtrak code previously used by the 1963 St. Petersburg station.

== See also ==
- Clearwater Subdivision
- Dunedin History Museum
- Tarpon Springs Depot

== Bibliography ==
- Luisi, Vincent (2010), Railroading in Pinellas County (1st ed.), Arcadia Publishing, ISBN 978-0-7385-8550-5
