= Jacksonville Division =

Railway division of CSX Transportation

The Jacksonville Division is a railroad division operated by CSX Transportation in the U.S. states of Florida, Georgia, and Alabama. The Jacksonville Division has 36 subdivisions.

The subdivisions within the Jacksonville Division are as follows:

- Achan Subdivision
- Auburndale Subdivision
- Bainbridge Subdivision
- Bone Valley Subdivision
- Brewster Subdivision
- Brooker Subdivision
- Brooksville Subdivision
- Brunswick Subdivision
- Callahan Subdivision
- Carters Subdivision
- CH Subdivision
- Clearwater Subdivision
- Deerhaven Subdivision
- Dothan Subdivision
- Fernandina Subdivision
- Fitzgerald Subdivision
- Homestead Subdivision
- Jacksonville Terminal Subdivision
- Jesup Subdivision
- Kingsland Subdivision
- Lakeland Subdivision
- Miami Subdivision
- Nahunta Subdivision
- P&A Subdivision
- Palmetto Subdivision
- Plant City Subdivision
- Sanford Subdivision
- Savannah Subdivision
- Tallahassee Subdivision
- Tampa Terminal Subdivision
- Thomasville Subdivision
- Valrico Subdivision
- Vitis Subdivision
- West Coast Subdivision
- Wildwood Subdivision
- Yeoman Subdivision

== See also ==
- List of CSX Transportation lines
