= South Florida Railroad =

Historic railroad in Central Florida

- Interactive Map of South Florida Railroad main line (red) and branches (dark red)

Overview
- Locale: Florida
- Dates of operation: 1880–1902
- Successor: Plant System; Atlantic Coast Line Railroad

Technical
- Track gauge: 4 ft 8 1/2 in (1,435 mm) standard gauge
- Previous gauge: originally 3 ft (914 mm) gauge

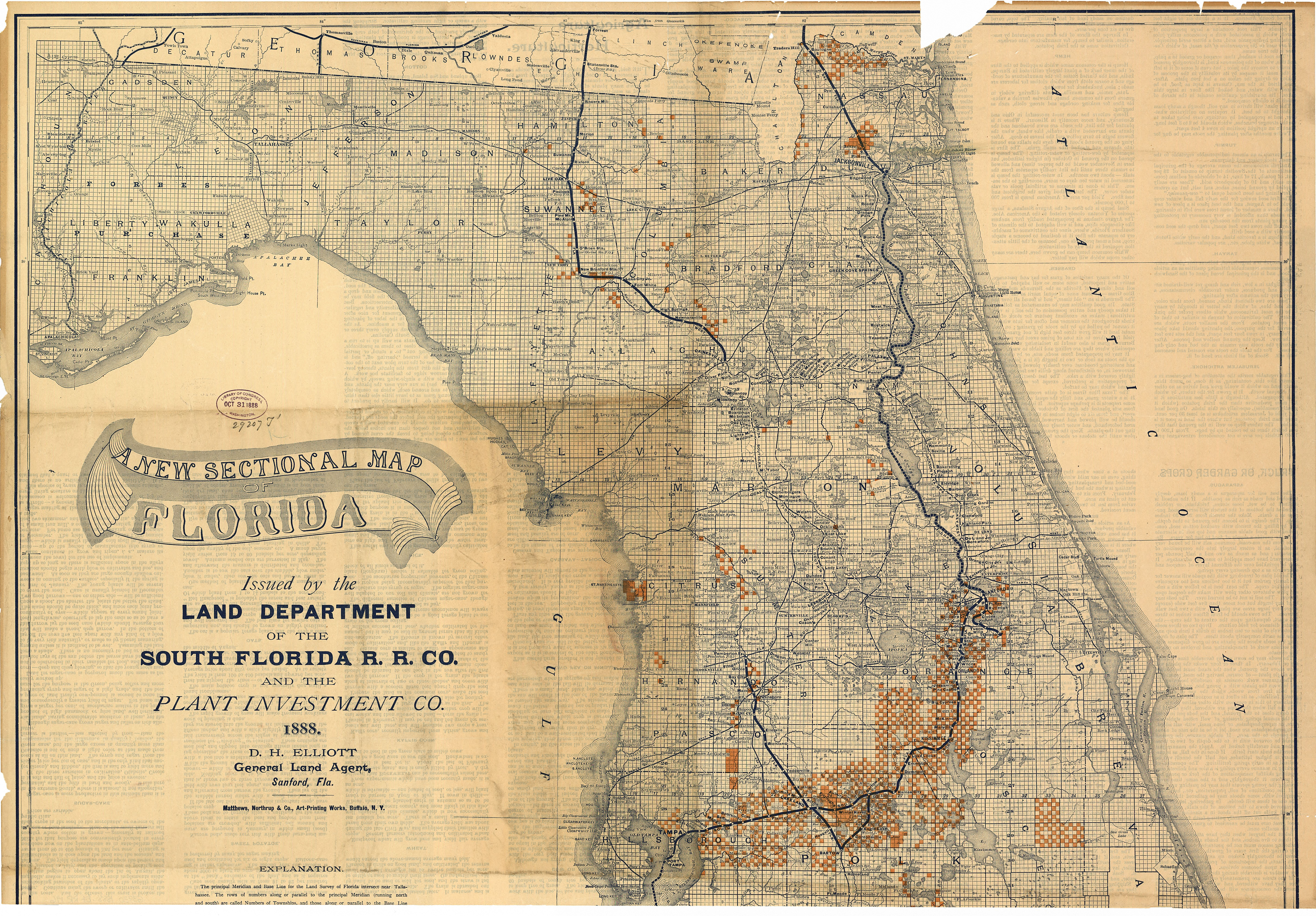
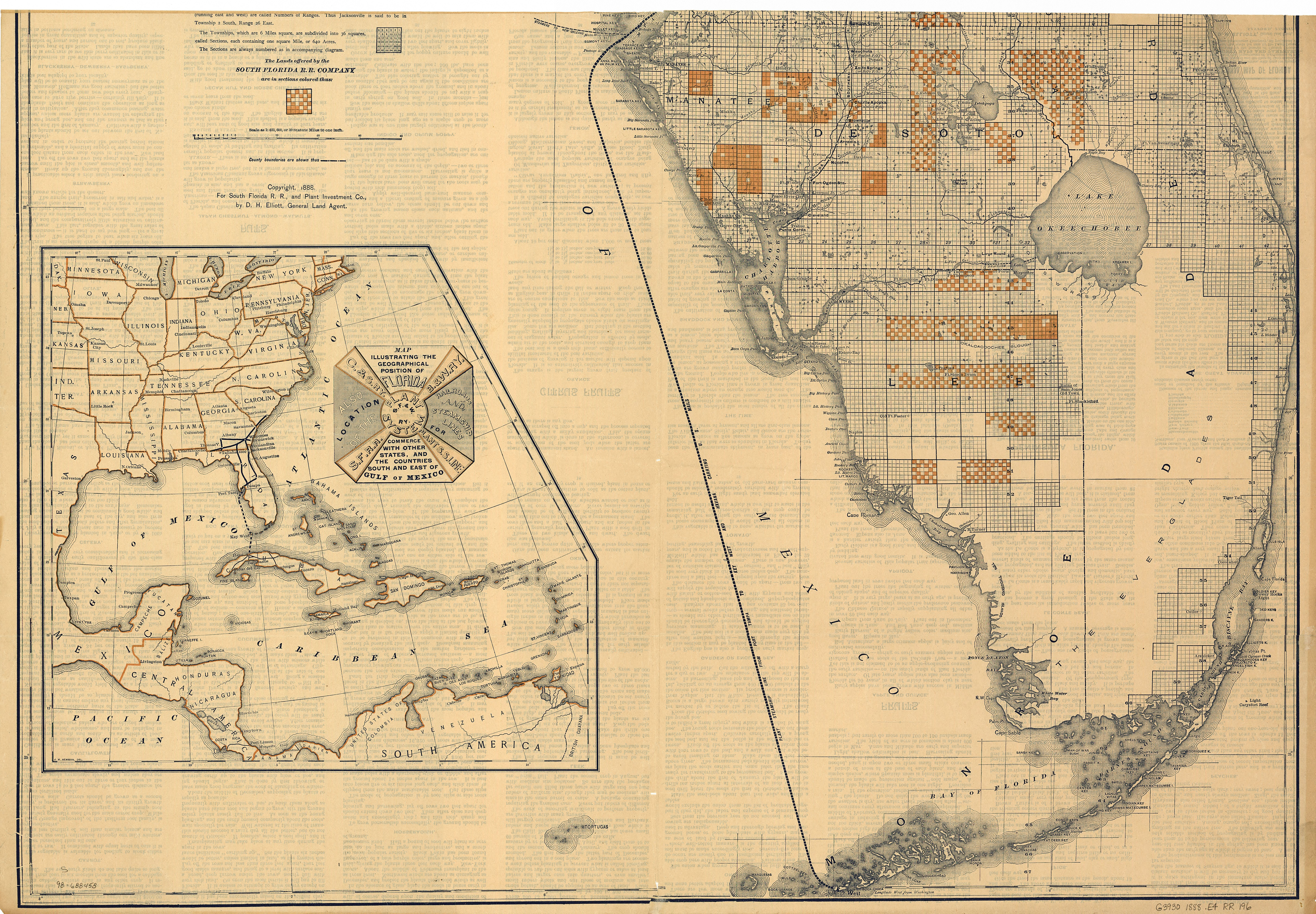
1888 map

The South Florida Railroad was a railroad from Sanford, Florida, to Tampa, Florida, becoming part of the Plant System in 1893 and the Atlantic Coast Line Railroad in 1902. It served as the southernmost segment of the Atlantic Coast Line's main line. The line remains in service today and is now part of the Central Florida Rail Corridor in the Orlando metro area. The rest of the line remains under the ownership of CSX Transportation as part of their A Line.

== History ==
The Lake Monroe and Orlando Railroad was organized in 1875 with a charter to build from the St. Johns River port of Sanford south to Orlando. The South Florida Railroad was incorporated on October 16, 1878, but was unable to obtain a charter until December 9, 1879, when it took over the charter of the Lake Monroe and Orlando, which was in danger of losing its land grants. The South Florida first ran on November 11, 1880, running the short distance between Sanford and Orlando. However the company had plans to continue to the Gulf of Mexico, reaching it at Tampa.

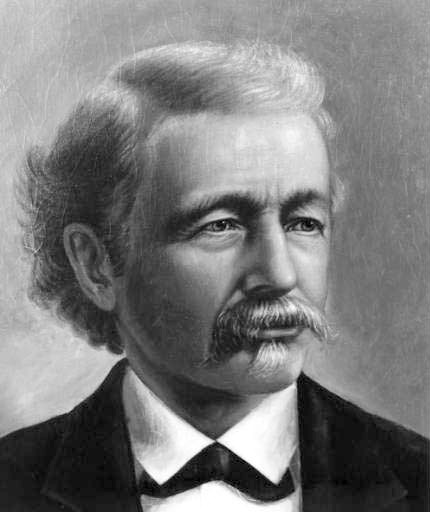
Henry B. Plant

On May 4, 1883, Henry B. Plant and his Plant System (headed by the Savannah, Florida and Western Railway) bought 3/5 of the stock of the South Florida after an unsuccessful attempt to buy the Florida Southern Railway. Plant had made an agreement with the Florida Southern not to build the SF&W south of Gainesville or Palatka, the northern ends of the Florida Southern, but the existing South Florida was immune from this. Plant then made agreements with all the railroads building towards Tampa except for the Florida Transit and Peninsular Railroad. Specifically, the Florida Southern would not build any lines south of Pemberton's Ferry and Brooksville or north of Bartow, and the South Florida would build its Pemberton Ferry Branch between the two and assign trackage rights to the Florida Southern. The agreement with the Jacksonville, Tampa and Key West Railway specified that that company would only build north of Sanford; in both cases the South Florida would give up their rights to the territories given to the other companies. The JT&KW had already done some grading at Bartow and Tampa, and sold them to the South Florida.

Thus two railroads remained in a race towards Tampa - the South Florida and the Florida Transit and Peninsular Railroad. The South Florida managed to get there first, and obtained the best ports (now known as Port Tampa). The South Florida's original passenger depot in Tampa was located on the east side of the intersection of Ashley and Madison Streets. The Tampa end opened on December 10, 1883, and on January 25, 1884 service began over the full line, built to 3 ft (914 mm) narrow gauge. On February 20, 1886 the 4 ft 8 1/2 in (1,435 mm) standard gauge Jacksonville, Tampa and Key West Railway opened to Sanford, and the South Florida was converted to standard gauge on September 22.

In 1893 the Savannah, Florida and Western Railway (Plant System) directly acquired the South Florida. Henry Plant died in 1899, which led his heirs to sell the Plant System to the Atlantic Coast Line Railroad in 1902. The Atlantic Coast Line would then designate the South Florida Railroad main line (along with the main line of the Jacksonville, Tampa and Key West Railway and other railroads to the north) as their nearly 900-mile main line from Richmond, Virginia to Tampa.

In 1967 the Atlantic Coast Line merged with the Seaboard Air Line Railroad (who operated the former Florida Central and Peninsular Railroad, the South Florida's former competitor), becoming the Seaboard Coast Line Railroad. Seaboard Coast Line eventually became CSX in the 1980s, and the South Florida/Atlantic Coast Line main line now operates as part of one of its two main lines in the area, known as the "A" Line.

In 2011, CSX sold the line from Poinciana north (as well as part of the former Jacksonville, Tampa and Key West Railway) to the Florida Department of Transportation. This state-owned segment is known as the Central Florida Rail Corridor, which includes most of the track that the SunRail commuter rail service operates on. SunRail began operation on May 1, 2014, from Sand Lake Road north to DeBary (later extended North to DeLand in 2024) and extended service south to Poinciana on July 30, 2018. SunRail also revived passenger service to the South Florida Railroad's historic Church Street Station in Downtown Orlando.

== Lines ==
=== Main Line ===
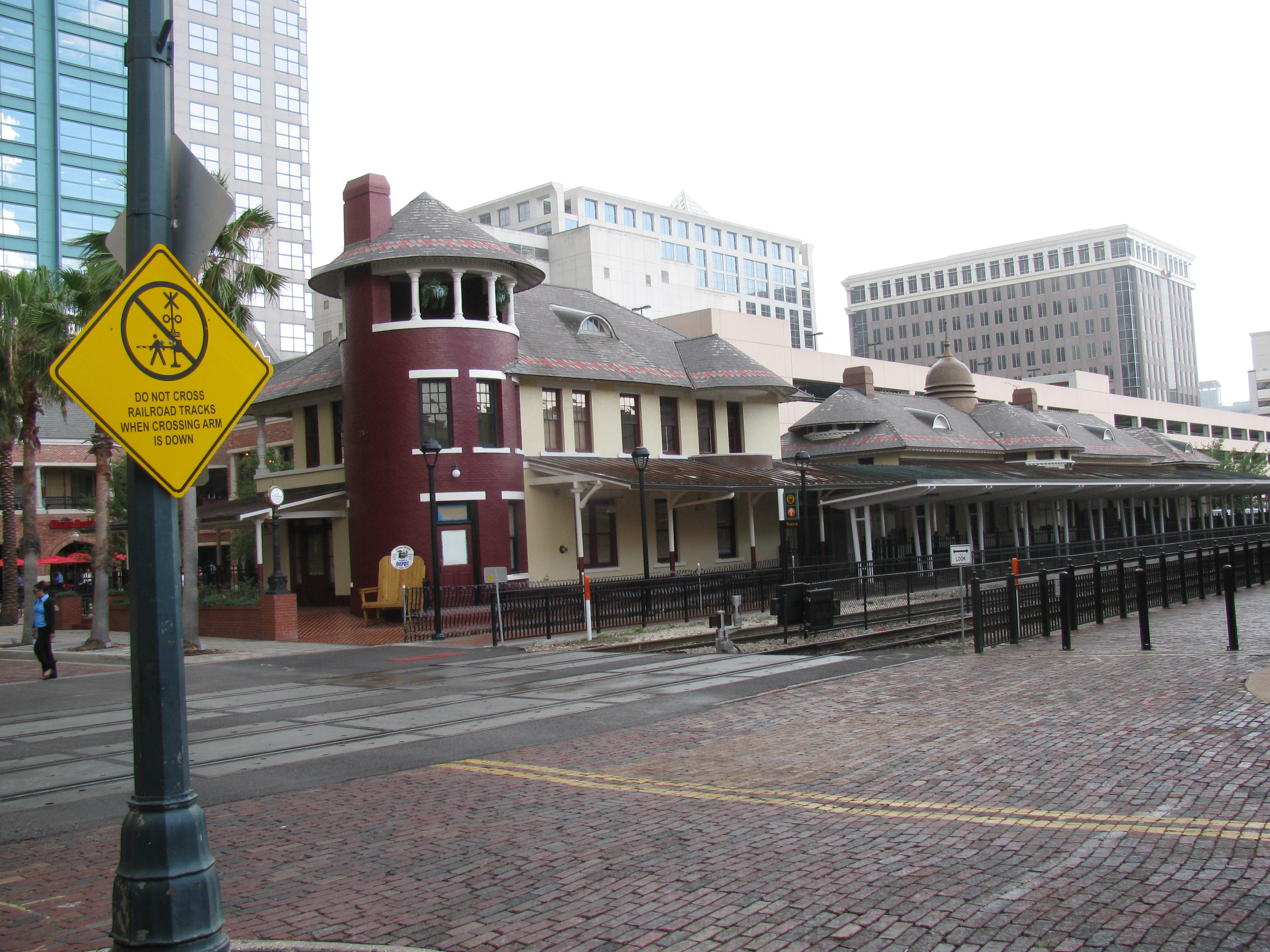
South Florida Railroad's historic Church Street Station in 2014. It now serves SunRail trains.

When completed in 1884, the South Florida Railroad's main line ran from Sanford southwest through Orlando and Lakeland to Tampa, terminating at Port Tampa. The main line today runs south of and roughly parallel to Interstate 4. Some of the towns along the line were named for railroad officials. Plant City was named for Henry Plant, and Haines City was named for Colonel Henry Haines, who organized the construction of the line and was considered to be Plant's most trusted employee.

The main line remains in service and is today the southernmost segment of CSX's A Line

- CSX (Poinciana to Port Tampa)
  - Carters Subdivision (Poinciana to South Lakeland)
  - Lakeland Subdivision (South Lakeland to Mango)
  - Tampa Terminal Subdivision (Mango to Port Tampa)

Amtrak continues to operate passenger service on the line and uses it to reach Tampa Union Station. Amtrak's Miami-bound trains also travel the line to Auburndale and turn south on to the Auburndale Subdivision.

Prior to the sale of the north end of the line to FDOT, the line was part of CSX's Sanford Subdivision from Auburndale north. Since the sale, CSX only operates local freight on the Central Florida Rail Corridor. Freight service on the CFRC is based out of Taft Yard in Pine Castle, which CSX still owns. All of CSX's through freight traffic to northern Florida now uses the adjacent S Line. The Florida Central Railroad, which connects to the Central Florida Rail Corridor in Downtown Orlando, also has freight trackage rights from its connection south to Taft Yard.

=== Pemberton Ferry Branch ===
Part of the agreement worked out by Henry Plant between the South Florida and the Florida Southern Railway specified that the South Florida would build the north-south Pemberton Ferry Branch. This branch began at a junction with the Florida Southern at Pemberton Ferry (known today as Croom), running south-southeast across the mainline at Lakeland to Bartow. South of Bartow, the Florida Southern continued to Punta Gorda, using trackage rights over the branch. The branch was completed in September 1884. Once the Bone Valley phosphate district was discovered near Lakeland, pressure increased to standard-gauge the line, and that was done on August 7, 1891.

After the Plant System bought the South Florida, an extension was built north from Pemberton Ferry to Inverness, where the Plant System's Silver Springs, Ocala and Gulf Railroad continued north, which was completed in 1891.

In the Atlantic Coast Line era, the north leg of the Pemberton Ferry Branch would serve as the southernmost segment of their R Line, which ran from DuPont, Georgia to Lakeland via High Springs. By the 1920s, the line was busy enough that the Atlantic Coast Line expanded the line north of Vitis Junction to double track to increase capacity.

The line is also notable for being the location of the Great Train Wreck of 1956 in Pineola (just north of Pemberton Ferry), which was head-on collision between two Atlantic Coast Line Railroad freight trains on October 18, 1956, killing five crewmen. A signpost at the site of the crash on the Withlacoochee State Trail memorializes the event.

The branch's north leg is still in service from Lakeland to Owensboro (just southwest of Lacoochee) and the south leg is still in service from the main line to Eaton Park. The abandoned segment north of Owensboro is now part of the Withlacoochee State Trail (which also continues up the abandoned extension to Inverness). The south leg is now an industrial spur. The Fort Fraser Trail today runs along the abandoned right-of way from Eaton Park south to Bartow.

The branch is operated by CSX in the following segments:

- Wildwood Subdivision (Owensboro to Vitis Junction)
- Vitis Subdivision (Vitis Junction to Lakeland)
- CH Spur (Lakeland to Eaton Park)

=== Bartow Branch ===
The charter specified that the railroad must pass through Bartow; thus the Bartow Branch was built from the mainline at Lake Alfred (Bartow Junction) southwest to Bartow. It opened in 1884 and was standard gauged on September 23, 1886. It retained passenger service since its opening and through its acquisition by Atlantic Coast Line Railroad until 1967 when it was discontinued after the merger of Atlantic Coast Line Railroad with Seaboard Air Line Railroad.

After the acquisition and merger, southern parts of the line were abandoned by Seaboard Air Line Railroad in the 1980s, namely from Bartow to Gordonville and Lake Alfred to Winter Haven.

Part of the Bartow branch remains today from Winter Haven south to Gordonville (just northeast of Bartow). This segment is operated by the Florida Midland Railroad. The abandoned segment between Lake Alfred and Winter Haven is now the route of the Chain of Lakes Trail.

=== Other Branches ===
Lake Charm

The Sanford and Indian River Railroad was chartered in 1881 to run from Sanford southeast to Oviedo and Lake Charm. The South Florida leased it in 1883, and it was standard gauged on September 21, 1886. Today, the route is still in service as CSX's Aloma Spur from Sanford to Winter Springs. The Cross Seminole Trail runs along the former right of way from Winter Springs to Oviedo.

Apopka

The Apopka Branch was part of the original charter, running from Mayo on the mainline west to the Withlacoochee River via Apopka. The line was never opened by the South Florida, instead partially opening as the Apopka and Atlantic Railroad which was later purchased by Legh. O. Garrett in 1888 in the interest of constructing a larger line to follow the Atlantic Ocean and Indian River to Apopka. It was never financially successful.

Narcoossee

The St. Cloud and Sugar Belt Railway was incorporated in 1888 to connect Kissimmee to St. Cloud and Narcoossee. It was immediately operated by the South Florida, and was merged into it in 1893. Neptune Road (CR 525) runs along some of the former right of way.

== Historic Stations ==
Main Line
Milepost	City/Location	Station	Opening Date	Connections and Notes
A 766.3	Sanford	Sanford	1880	Rebuilt in 1913 and 1953; Junction with: Jacksonville, Tampa and Key West Railway (ACL); Sanford and Lake Eustis Railway (ACL); Sanford and Indian River Railroad (SFRR/ACL)
	Lake Mary	Belair/Bents	1888-1893	
A 771.3	Lake Mary	Lake Mary	1888 c.	
A 774.4	Longwood	Soldiers Creek	1888-1900 c.	
A 778.4	Longwood	Longwood	1880	Junction with: Florida Midland Railroad (ACL); Orange Belt Railway (ACL)
A 781.3	Altamonte Springs	Altamonte Springs	1880	Originally Snowville
		Mayo/Woodbridge	1888-1899 c.	Junction with Apopka and Atlantic Railroad
A 783.0	Maitland	Maitland	1880	
A 785.6	Winter Park	Winter Park	1882	Amtrak Silver Meteor, Silver Star and Sunset Limited; Rebuilt in 1912 and 1962
		Wilcox/Formosa	1880-1899 c.	
A 791.1	Orlando	Church Street Station	1880-1926	Original station Junction with: Tavares, Orlando and Atlantic Railroad (SAL); East Florida and Atlantic Railroad (SAL)
A 790.4	Orlando	Orlando	1926	Amtrak Silver Meteor, Silver Star and Sunset Limited
		Eight Oaks	1890-1900 c.	
		Troy	1886-1900 c.	
		Gatlin	1890-1898 c.	
		Jessamine	1888-1898 c.	
A 793.1	Pine Castle	Pine Castle	1882	
A 798.4	Taft	Taft	1886 c.	Originally Big Cypress
		McKinnon	1886-1910 c.	
		Marydia	1886-1898 c.	
A 808.0	Kissimmee	Kissimmee	1882	Amtrak Silver Meteor and Silver Star; Junction with: St. Cloud and Sugar Belt Railway (SFRR); Florida Midland Railroad (ACL)
A 812.0	Campbell	Campbell		
A 819.1	Loughman	Loughman		Originally Lake Locke
		Emmaton		
A 824.8	Davenport	Davenport		
A 829.4	Haines City	Haines City	1920	Junction with Atlantic Coast Line Railroad Haines City Branch
A 835.6	Lake Alfred	Lake Alfred	c. 1920	Originally Bartow Junction; Junction with Bartow Branch
A 839.7	Auburndale	Auburndale		Junction with Seaboard Air Line Railroad Miami Subdivision
		Fitzhughs		
A 844.7		Carters Kill		
	Acton	Acton		Absorbed into Lakeland by 1894
A 851.8	Lakeland	Lakeland	1884	Amtrak Silver Star; Rebuilt in 1910 and 1998; Junction with Pemberton Ferry Branch
A 855.4	Winston	Winston		Junction with Winston and Bone Valley Railroad (ACL)
A 858.4		Youmans		
A 861.1	Plant City	Plant City		Replaced by Plant City Union Depot in 1909; Junction with: Florida Central and Peninsular Railroad Tampa Division (SAL); Plant City, Arcadia, and Gulf Railroad (SAL)
A 867.8	Dover	Dover		Also known as Cork
		Sparkman		
A 870.9	Seffner	Seffner	c.1927	
A 873.5	Mango	Mango		
	Orient Park	Orient		
A 878.8	Tampa	Uceta		Junction with Tampa Southern Railroad (ACL)
A 879.6	Tampa	Thonotosassa Junction		Junction with Tampa and Thonotosassa Railroad (ACL)
A 881.7	Tampa	Tampa Union Station	1912	Amtrak Silver Star; Junction with: Tampa Northern Railroad (SAL); Florida Central and Peninsular Railroad Tampa Division (SAL)
	Tampa	Tampa	1883-1912	Original station located at Ashley and Madison Streets
	Tampa	Tampa Bay Hotel		Located on a wye
	Tampa	Citronia		
A 890.1	Tampa	Port Tampa		

Pemberton Ferry Branch
Milepost	City/Location	Station	Opening Date	Connections and Notes
AR 794.3	Inverness	Inverness	1891	Junction with Silver Springs, Ocala and Gulf Railroad (ACL)
AR 805.3	Floral City	Floral City		
AR 812.2	Istachatta	Istachatta		
AR 814.5		Pemberton Ferry	1884	Later renamed Croom; Junction with Florida Southern Railway (ACL)
		Fitzgerald		
		Oriole		
	Rital	Bay City		
AR 823.3	Trilby	Trilby		Junction with Orange Belt Railway (ACL)
AR 824.7	Owensboro	Owensboro		Junction with Florida Central and Peninsular Railroad Tampa Division (SAL)
AR 830.2	Dade City	Dade City		
AR 832.8		Ellerslie		
AR 835.2		Richland		
		Tedderville		
AR 849.8	Kathleen	Kathleen		
	Griffin	Griffin's Mill		
AR 856.5; A 851.8; AX 851.8	Lakeland	Lakeland	1884	Amtrak Silver Star; Junction with Main Line
AX 859.0	Highland City	Haskell		Later renamed Highland City
AX 864.0	Bartow	Bartow		Junction with: Bartow Branch; Seaboard Air Line Railroad Valrico Subdivision; Florida Southern Railway (ACL)

Bartow Branch
Milepost	City/Location	Station	Opening Date	Connections and Notes
AW 835.6	Lake Alfred	Lake Alfred		Originally Bartow Junction; Junction with Main Line
AW 839.1	Winter Haven	Florence Villa		Junction with Niles Branch
AW 842.0	Winter Haven	Winter Haven		Junction with Seaboard Air Line Railroad Miami Subdivision
AW 844.0	Eagle Lake	Eagle Lake		
AW 848.0		Gordonville		
AW 851.0	Bartow	Bartow		Junction with: Pemberton Ferry Branch; Florida Southern Railway (ACL); Seaboard Air Line Railroad Valrico Subdivision
