= Sanford Subdivision =

CSX railroad line in Florida

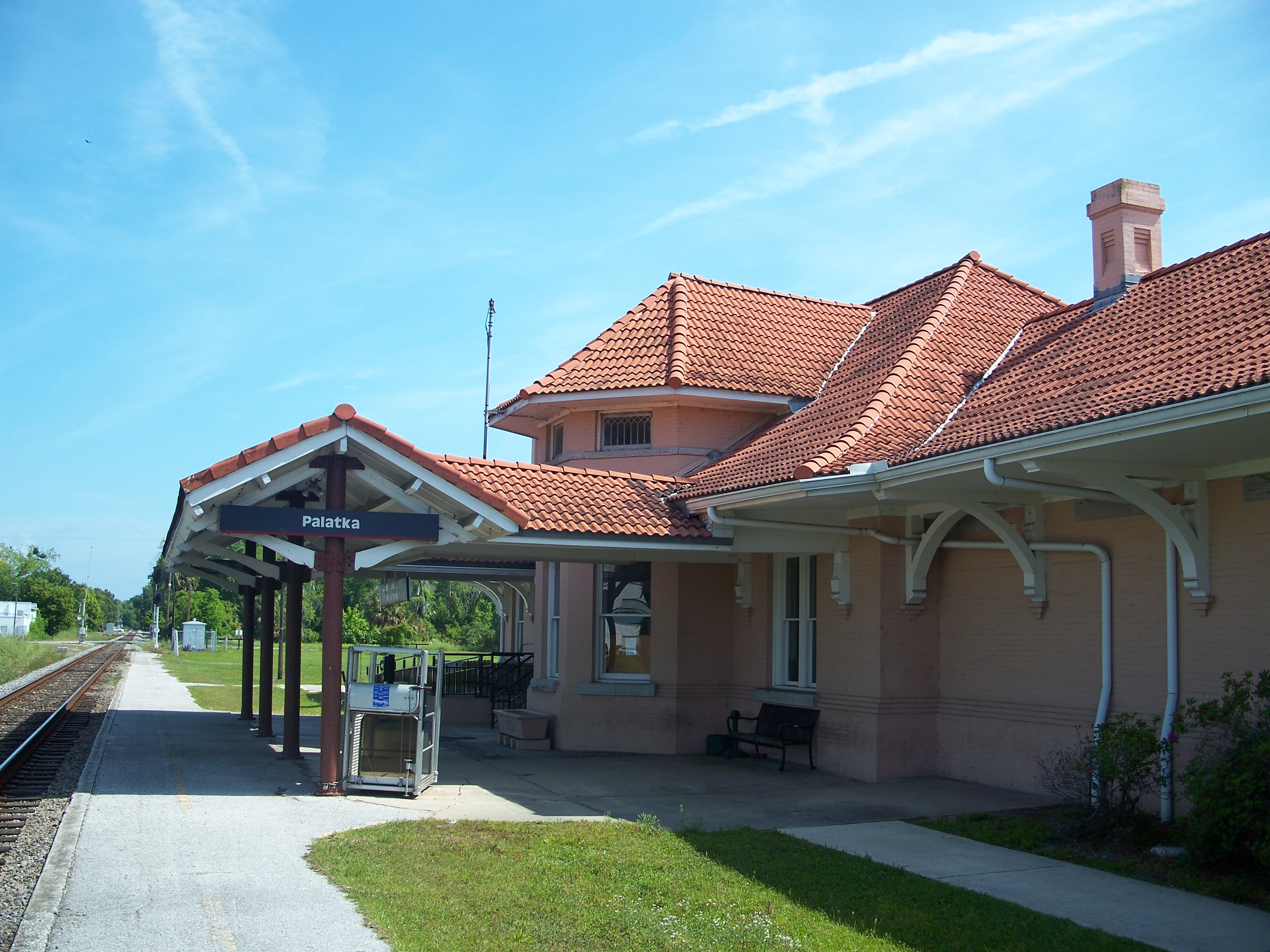
Palatka Amtrak station along Sanford Subdivision

The Sanford Subdivision is a railroad line owned by CSX Transportation in Florida. The line runs along CSX's A Line from St. Johns (near Jacksonville) south through Palatka to DeLand.

== Route description ==
The Sanford Subdivision begins just south of Jacksonville in St. Johns, where it continues from the Jacksonville Terminal Subdivision. From St. Johns, the Sanford Subdivision proceeds south across the Ortega River (historically known as McGirts Creek) and runs along the west side of the St. Johns River. It passes through Orange Park and Green Cove Springs before reaching to Palatka. About 5 miles south of Palatka, the Sanford Subdivision crosses the St. Johns River and passes through Satsuma. It then passes between Crescent Lake and Lake George before passing through Barbervile and DeLeon Springs. Sanford Subdivision currently ends just north of Deland station in Deland. From here, the line continues south as the state-owned Central Florida Rail Corridor.

== Operation ==
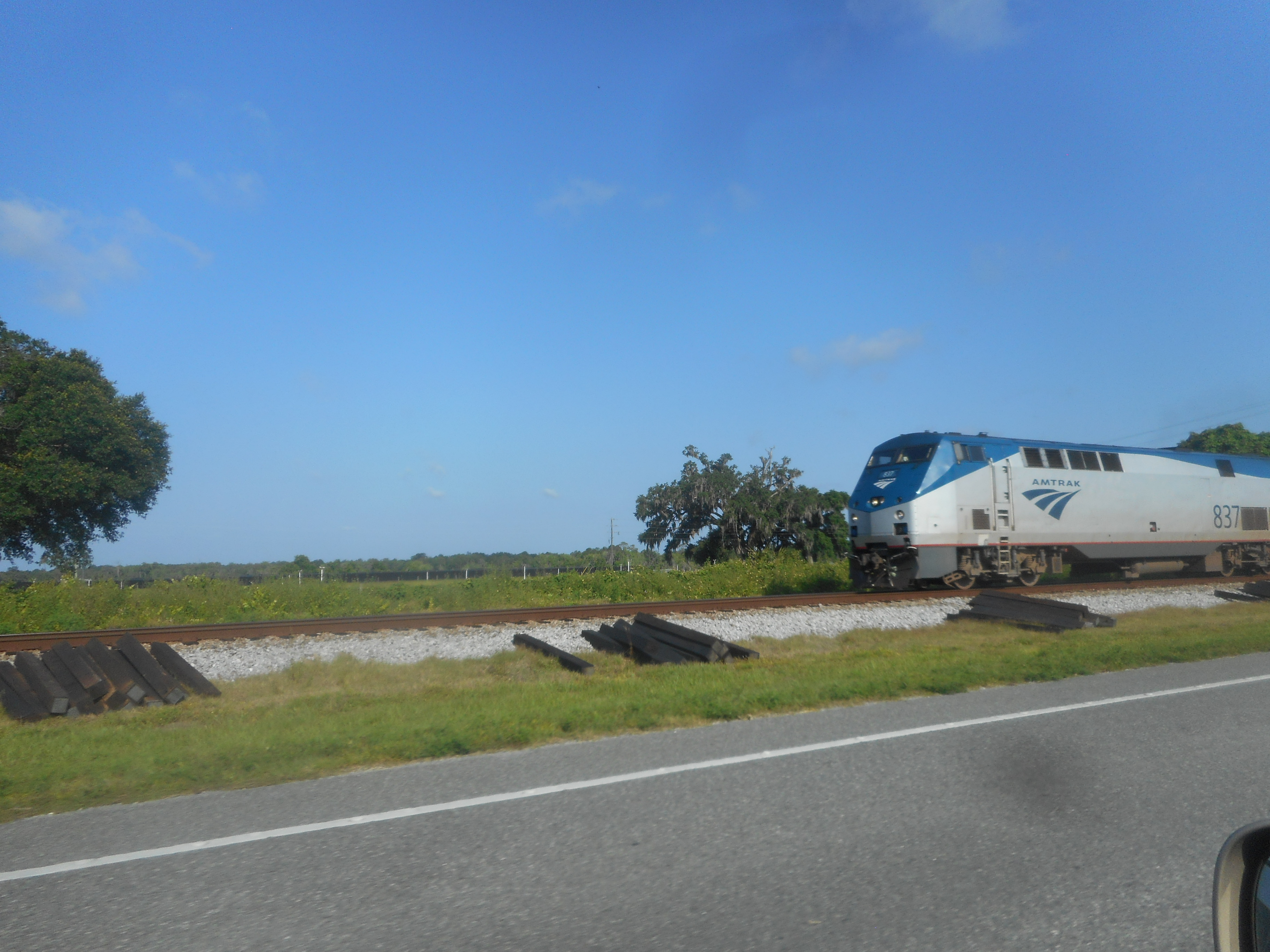
Amtrak operating on the Sanford Subdivision

All three of Amtrak's Florida trains (the Silver Meteor, Floridian, and the Auto Train) run the line round-trip daily. CSX largely uses the Sanford Subdivision only for local freight.

== History ==
Today, the Sanford Subdivision operates on tracks that were historically part of the Jacksonville, Tampa, and Key West Railway. That railroad became part of the Plant System, which was acquired by the Atlantic Coast Line Railroad in 1902. The line would become part of the Atlantic Coast Line's main line.

The Atlantic Coast Line became the Seaboard Coast Line Railroad (SCL) after merging with the Seaboard Air Line Railroad in 1967. The former Atlantic Coast Line main line was then known as the A Line. The Seaboard Coast Line also adopted the Seaboard Air Line's method of naming their lines as subdivisions, resulting in the line being designated as the Sanford Subdivision. Initially, the Sanford Subdivision designation extended along the A Line from Jacksonville south to Sanford. In the late 1980s, the Sanford Subdivision was extended down the A Line as far south as Auburndale. The Seaboard Coast Line became CSX Transportation in 1986.

In 2011, CSX sold the Sanford Subdivision between Deland and Poinciana to the Florida Department of Transportation (FDOT). FDOT established the SunRail commuter rail service on the purchased segment of the line. The remaining Sanford Subdivision south of Poinciana was annexed to CSX's Carters Subdivision after the sale.

CSX largely discontinued running through freight on the Sanford Subdivision after the sale of the south end of the line to FDOT. Most through freight traffic was subsequently rerouted onto the S Line (Wildwood Subdivision).

== See also ==
- List of CSX Transportation lines
