= Auburndale City Hall =

- U.S. National Register of Historic Places
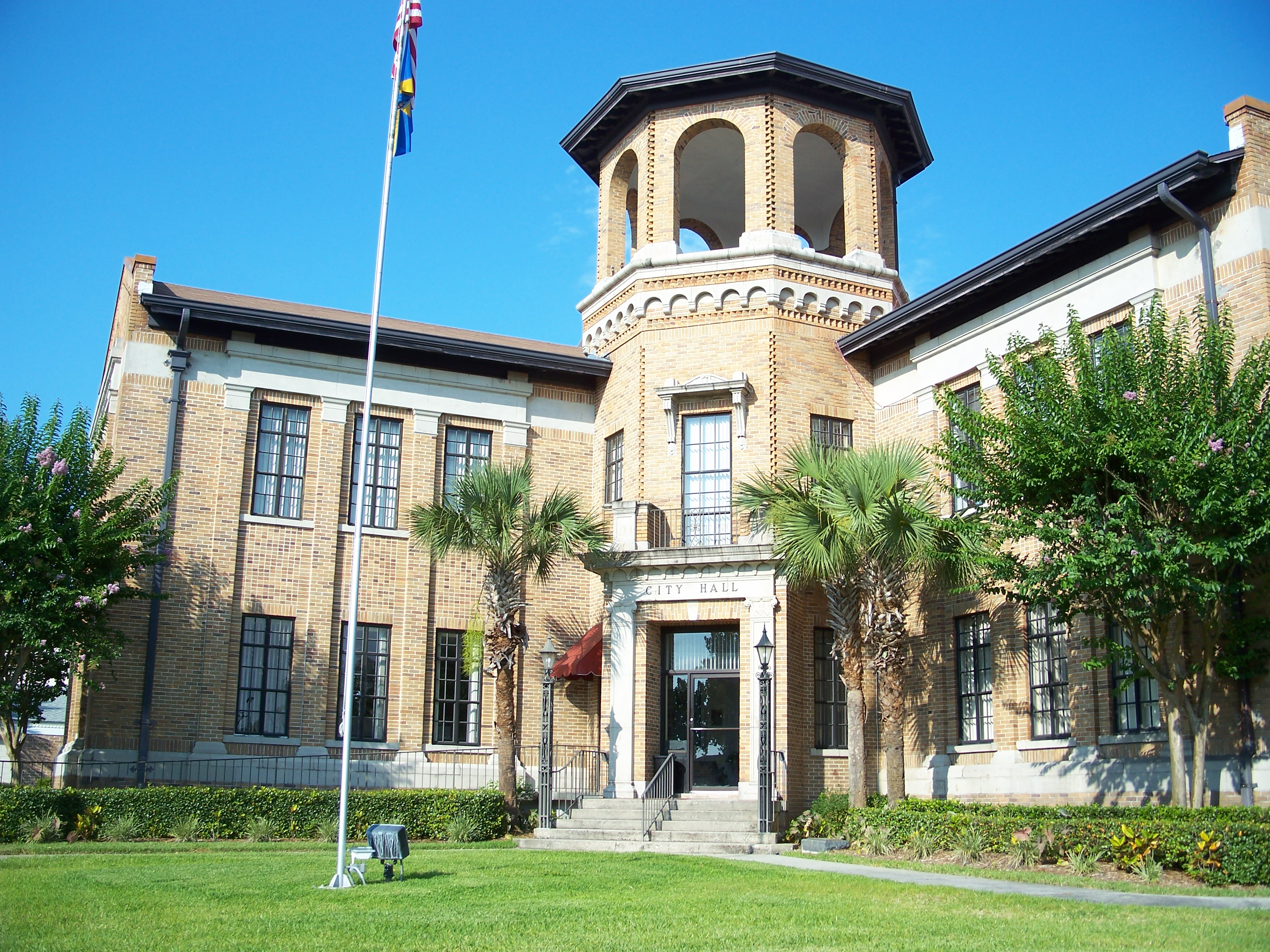

- Location within Florida Location within the United States
- Location: Auburndale, Florida
- Coordinates: 28°03′53″N 81°47′22″W
- Architect: Rolland C. Buckley
- Architectural style: Italian Renaissance Revival
- NRHP reference No.: 13000964
- Added to NRHP: December 24, 2013

Auburndale City Hall is a national historic site located at 1 Bobby Green Plaza, Auburndale, Florida in Polk County. The monument is an L-shaped two-story brick building, built in 1927 in Italian Renaissance Revival style.

It was added to the National Register of Historic Places on December 24, 2013.
