= Carters Subdivision =

CSX railroad line in Florida

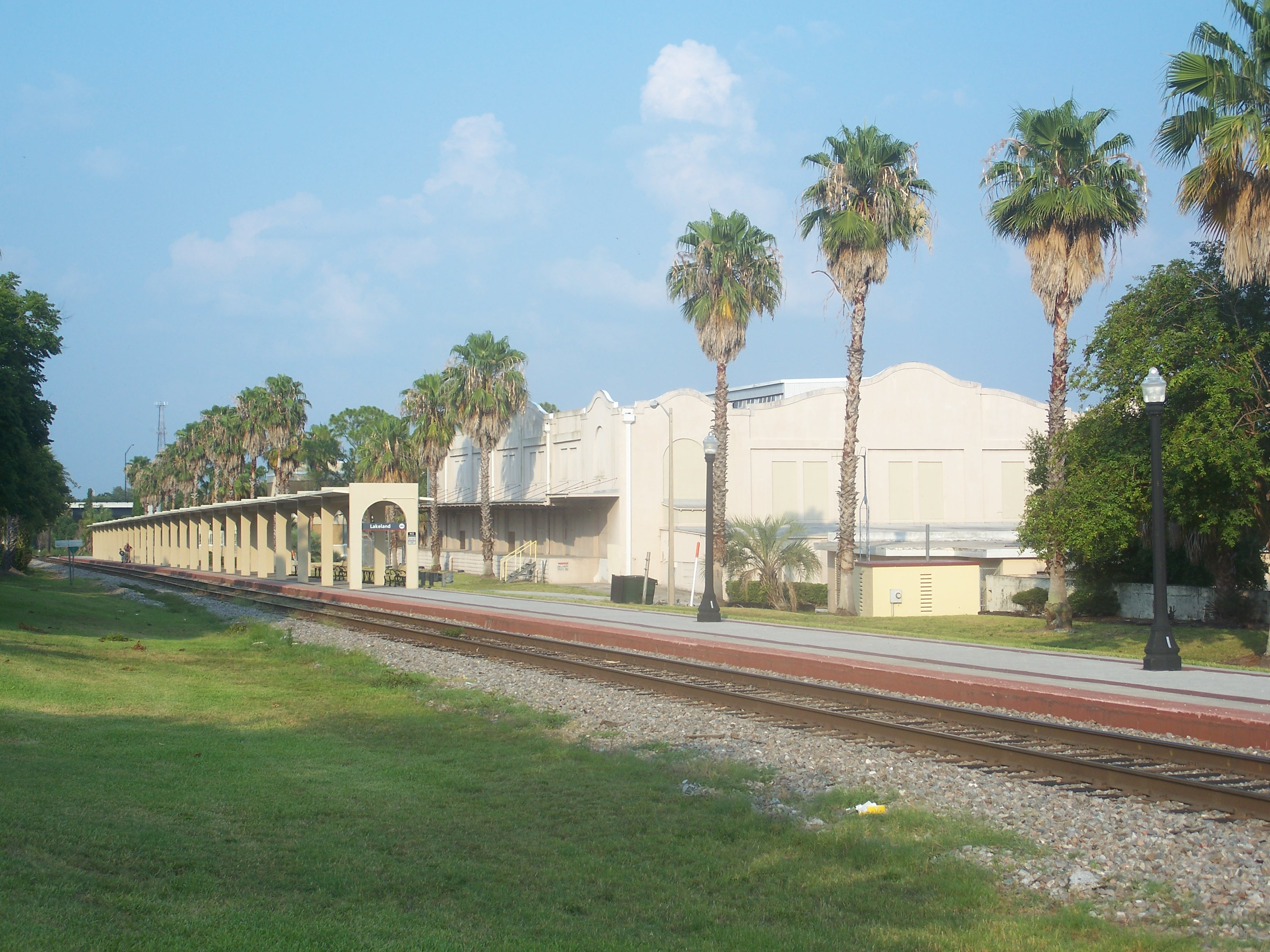
Lakeland Amtrak station along the Carters Subdivision

The Carters Subdivision is a railroad line owned by CSX Transportation in Florida. The line runs along CSX's A Line from Poinciana to Lakeland, a distance of 37 miles.

== Route description ==
The Carters Subdvision begins in Poinciana just south of the Poinciana station. From here, it heads west a short distance before turning south through Loughman and Davenport. In Haines City, it turns back west and passes through Lake Alfred and Auburndale. Just west of Downtown Auburndale, the Carters Subdivision connects with the Auburndale Subdivision at Auburndale Interlocking. Continuing west, the Carters Subdivision passes through Fussels Corner before reaching Downtown Lakeland. The Carters Subdivision terminates less than a mile west of the Lakeland station at Lakeland Junction. At Lakeland Junction, the route connects with the Vitis Subdivision to the north and the A Line continues west as the Lakeland Subdivision.

In addition to the main line, there are also some notable spur lines along the Carters Subdivision. The CH Spur begins at the main line just east of Lakeland station and runs south through an industrial area along US 98 to Eaton Park. Park Spur begins at the main line just west of Carters and runs north to serve the McIntosh Power Plant. Another spur also runs through Haines City.

== Operation ==
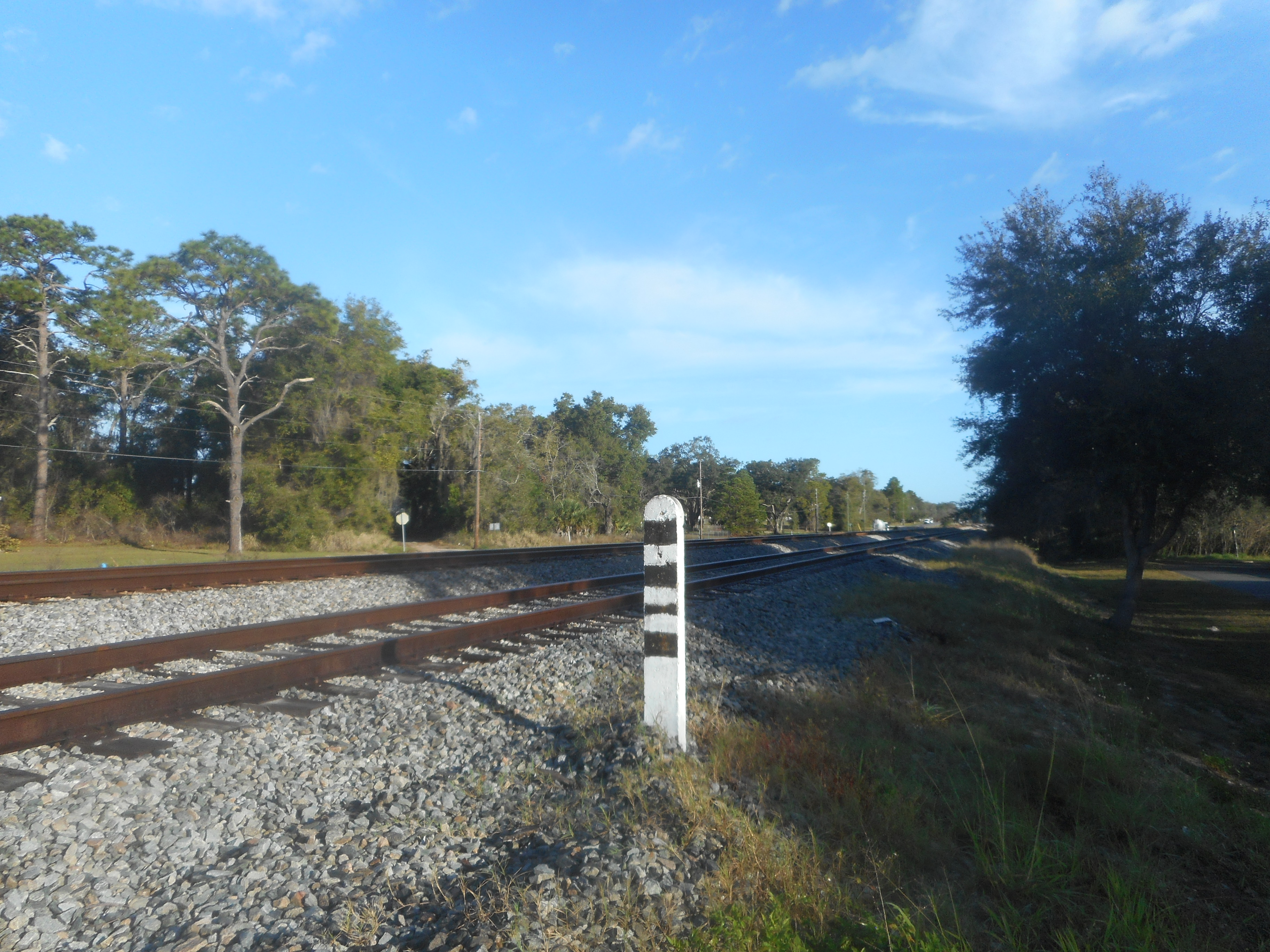
Carters Subdivision near Davenport

The Carters Subdivision hosts Amtrak's Silver Meteor and Floridian trains daily. The Floridian run the entire route to reach Tampa, while both trains run to Auburndale Interlocking to turn towards Miami.

All of CSX's through freight trains to Miami generally run the Carters Subdivision between Lakeland Junction and Auburndale, where they diverge on to the Auburndale Subdivision, CSX's only line to Miami. Local freight also runs on the line with a number of customers located on the Park Spur just east of Lakeland. The line notably serves a Martin Marietta facility near Loughman. Local freight bound for Taft Yard and customers on the Central Florida Rail Corridor in the Orlando area also run the line. No through freight to northern Florida runs on the Central Florida Rail Corridor.

== History ==
The Carters Subdivision first began service in 1884 and was built as part of Henry B. Plant's South Florida Railroad, which extended from Sanford to Tampa. Crews building the line from each end met up and completed the line just east of Lakeland at a location called Carter's Kill, which the Carters Subdivision is named for. The South Florida Railroad was absorbed by the Atlantic Coast Line Railroad in 1902, which became their main line.

The CH Spur was originally the south leg of South Florida Railroad's Pemberton Ferry Branch (the Vitis Subdivision was the north leg). The south leg would later be the northernmost segment of the Atlantic Coast Line's Lakeland–Fort Myers Line. The CH Spur was abandoned south of Eaton Park in the early 2000s. The spur through Haines City was built by the Atlantic Coast Line in 1910 as the Haines City Branch, which at one point extended as far south as Everglades City.

The Atlantic Coast Line became the Seaboard Coast Line Railroad (SCL) after merging with the Seaboard Air Line Railroad in 1967. The former Atlantic Coast Line main line was then known as the A Line. The Seaboard Coast Line also adopted the Seaboard Air Line's method of naming their lines as subdivisions. The line was initially designated as part the Lakeland Subdivision, which ran the A Line from Tampa to Sanford. The Seaboard Coast Line became CSX Transportation in 1986.

In the late 1980s, the line was renamed the Carters Subdivision between Lakeland Junction and Auburndale with track east of Auburndale becoming part of the Sanford Subdivision. After CSX sold the A Line north of Poinciana to the Florida Department of Transportation (FDOT) to create the Central Florida Rail Corridor, the Sanford Subdivision was truncated at Deland and the Carters Subdivision designation was extended up the A Line to Poinciana as it is today.

== See also ==
- List of CSX Transportation lines
