= Tampa Terminal Subdivision =

Railway line in Florida

The Tampa Terminal Subdivision is a group of railroad lines owned by CSX Transportation in and around Tampa, Florida. The Tampa Terminal Subdivision covers track around Yeoman and Uceta Yards and is located at the end of two of CSX's U.S. East Coast main lines to Richmond, Virginia, the A Line and the S Line.

== Lines ==
The Tampa Terminal Subdivision has three distinct lines running through it. The A and S Lines run east–west through the yards, and the AZA line runs from the yards south.

=== A Line ===
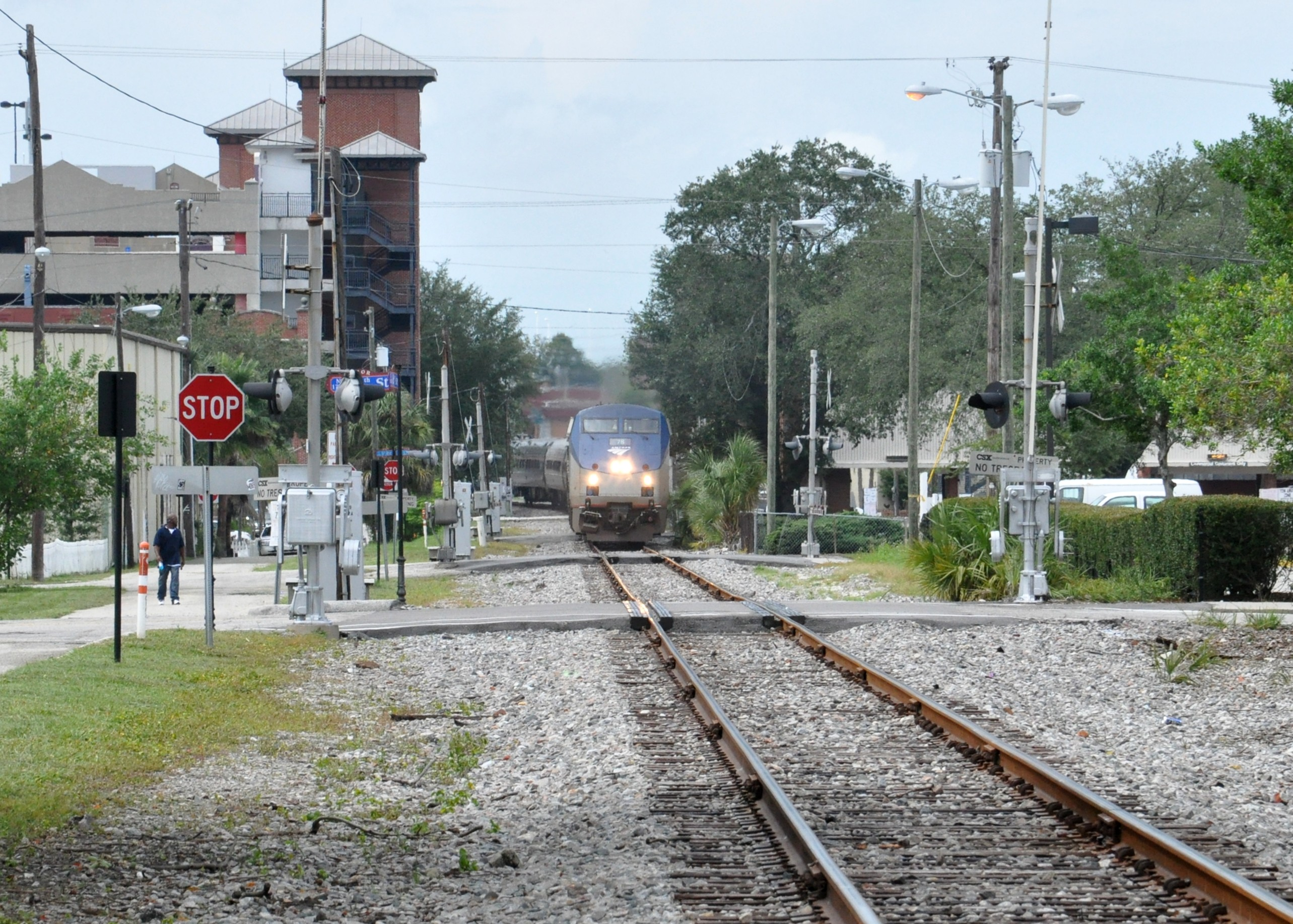
Amtrak's Silver Star leaving Tampa Union Station on the Tampa Terminal Subdivision in 2012.

The A Line is the northern east–west line which runs from Mango though Uceta Yard to Tampa Union Station and is 8.1 miles in length. It notably passes through Tampa's historic Ybor City neighborhood. The A Line crosses the TECO Line Streetcar track between Ybor City and Tampa Union Station which is CSX's only at-grade crossing with a streetcar track in Florida. All Amtrak trains to Tampa operates on the A Line along with some local freight trains.

The A Line is designated the Lakeland Subdivision east of the Tampa Terminal Subdivision. West of Tampa Union Station, the A Line continues southwest as the Port Tampa Spur. The Port Tampa Spur runs southwest to Port Tampa near MacDill Air Force Base and notably street runs along Polk Street in downtown Tampa before crossing the Hillsborough River.

The A Line's designation stands for the Atlantic Coast Line Railroad as it was previously the main line of the Atlantic Coast Line Railroad, a CSX predecessor.

=== S Line ===
The S Line is the southern east–west line which runs from control point YN (just east of the Tampa Bypass Canal) through Yeoman Yard to Gary and is 4 miles (6.4 km) in length. The S Line is CSX's main freight route through Peninsular Florida.

The S Line is designated the Yeoman Subdivision east of the Tampa Terminal Subdivision. At the west end of the Tampa Terminal Subdivision, the line splits with its northwest track crossing the A Line and leading to the Clearwater Subdivision while the southwest track leads to the Hooker's Point Lead.

The S Line's designation stands for the Seaboard Air Line Railroad as it was previously the main line of the Seaboard Air Line Railroad, another CSX predecessor.

=== AZA Line ===
The third line runs on the AZA Line from Yeoman Yard south to East Tampa and is 7.3 miles in length. At its south end the AZA line continues south to Bradenton as the Palmetto Subdivision.

=== Neve Spur ===
Another notable track within the Tampa Terminal Subdivision in the Neve Spur. The Neve Spur runs from a wye on the A Line just west of Uceta Yard and goes northeast a short distance to a point just south of Temple Terrace. The wye at the south end of the Neve Spur is often used for turning locomotives around and is notably where Amtrak's Silver Star is turned around to back into Tampa Union Station twice daily.

== Yards ==
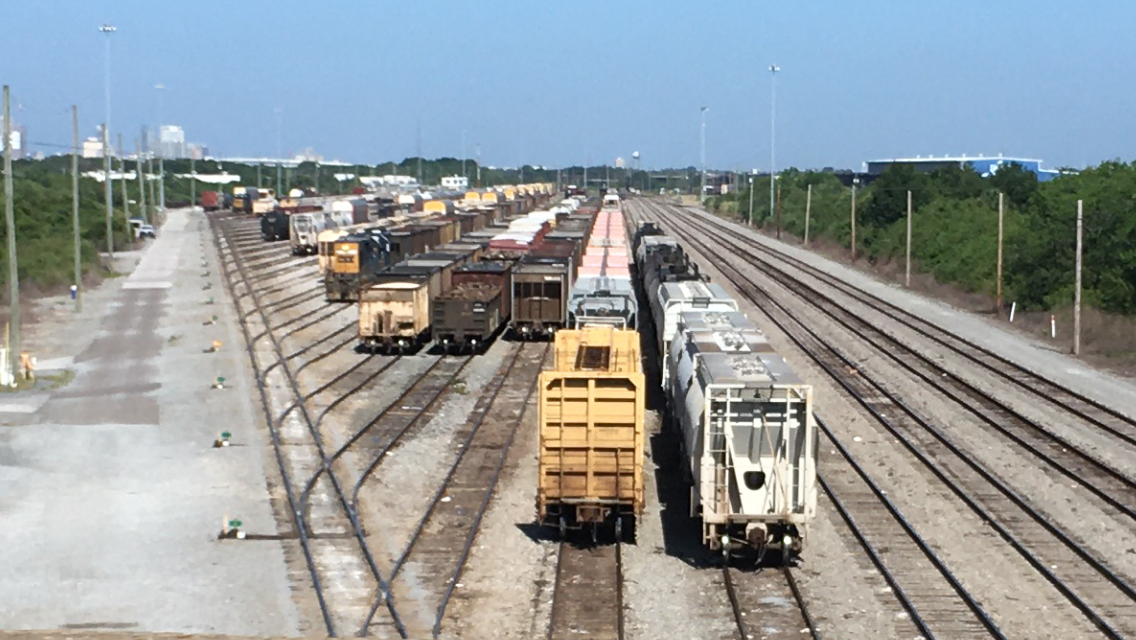
Yeoman Yard as seen from the Orient Road overpass

=== Yeoman and Uceta yards ===
The Tampa Terminal Subdivision is centered around Yeoman Yard, CSX's primary classification yard for the Tampa area. Yeoman Yard is located along the S Line (though it is also accessible from the A line). A track on the south side of Yeoman Yard connects the S Line with the AZA line and allows trains to bypass the yard without entering yard limits.

Uceta Yard is located just northwest of Yeoman Yard on the A Line. Uceta Yard serves as an intermodal terminal and car storage facility.

=== Rockport Yard ===
Another notable yard is Rockport Yard, located south of Yeoman Yard on a wye off the AZA Line. Rockport Yard serves CSX's Rockport Terminal, a deep-water port used for exporting phosphate. Trains bring phosphate for export mined from the Bone Valley in Central Florida. Rockport has been the primary phosphate export facility for the railroad since the closure of Port Boca Grande in 1979.

== History ==
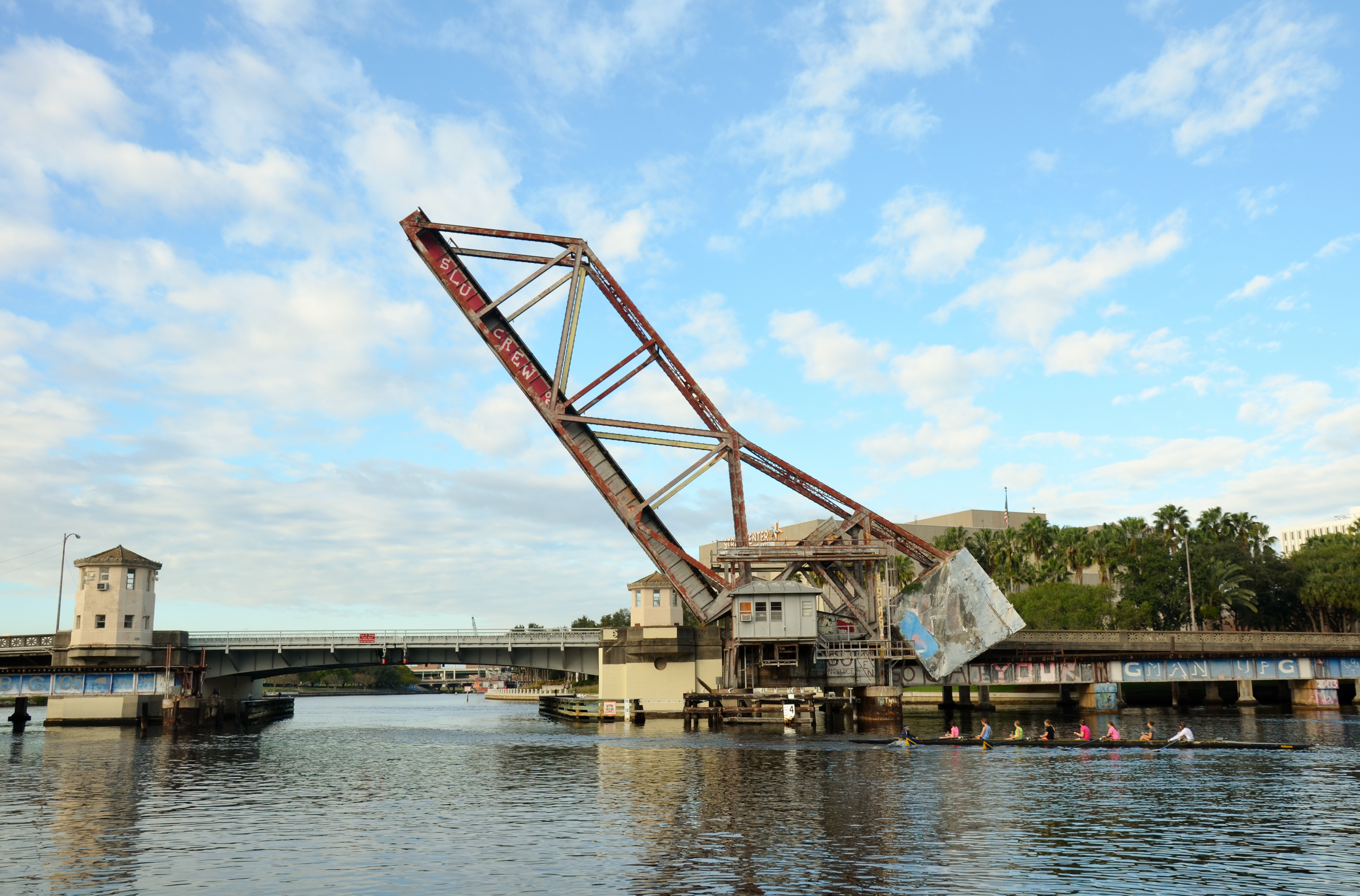
Hillsborough River Drawbridge on the Port Tampa Spur

The A Line was previously the main line of the Atlantic Coast Line Railroad with Uceta Yard being their main Tampa yard. The Atlantic Coast Line main line was originally built by the South Florida Railroad, which was part of Henry B. Plant's system of railroads. The line began service in 1884, and was taken over by the Atlantic Coast Line in 1902 after they bought the Plant System.

The Neve Spur was originally part of the Tampa and Thonotosassa Railroad, another Plant System railroad which at one point extended northeast to Zephyrhills and Vitis Junction.

The S Line was previously the main line of the Seaboard Air Line Railroad. The Seaboard Air Line main line was originally part of the Florida Central and Peninsular Railroad (FC&P) network and began service in 1890. The Seaboard Air Line acquired the line and the FC&P network in 1903. Historically, the line continued west from Gary along State Road 60 and then south along Meridian Avenue into Downtown Tampa. In 1909, the Seaboard Air Line established its own port facility on Seddon Island (known today as Harbour Island) and track was extended south to the island. Seddon Island was named after Seaboard's chief engineer W.L. Seddon. Seaboard built Yeoman Yard in the 1950s to be its main classification yard for Tampa. The Seaboard's smaller yard in Downtown Tampa remained in service was then known as Old Tampa Yard. The railroad would close and sell the Seddon Island terminal in 1979 and the S Line was truncated to Old Tampa Yard.

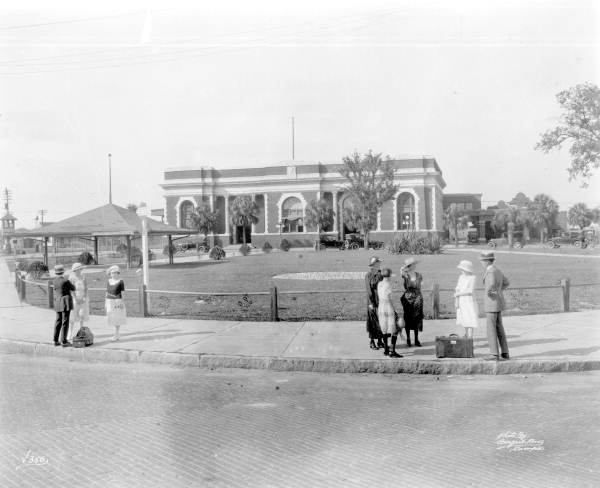
Tampa Union Station in 1922.

The Hooker's Point Lead and track leading to the Clearwater Subdivision was originally built by the Tampa Northern Railroad in 1908. In 1912, the Atlantic Coast Line, Seaboard Air Line, and the Tampa Northern Railroads jointly built Tampa Union Station to consolidate passenger operations in Tampa at a single location. The Atlantic Coast Line's previous depot (built by the South Florida Railroad) was located on the east side of the intersection of Ashley and Madison Streets. The Seaboard Air Line's depot (built by the FC&P Railroad) was located at the intersection of Franklin and Whiting Streets. The Seaboard Air Line acquired the Tampa Northern in 1912.

The AZA line south to East Tampa was built in 1918 by the Tampa Southern Railroad, a subsidiary of the Atlantic Coast Line. The control point "TS" at the north end of the line is a reference to the Tampa Southern.

The Atlantic Coast Line and Seaboard Air Line merged in 1967 becoming the Seaboard Coast Line Railroad, which brought all tracks in Tampa under a single owner. After the merger, Yeoman Yard was retained as the main classification yard for Tampa while Uceta Yard became an intermodal facility as it is today.

In 1980, the Seaboard Coast Line's parent company merged with the Chessie System, creating the CSX Corporation. The CSX Corporation initially operated the Chessie and Seaboard Systems separately until 1986, when they were merged into CSX Transportation.

The S Line route from Gary to Tampa Union Station was removed in the late 1980s, after Amtrak discontinued service to St. Petersburg in 1984. Track south of Tampa Union Station to Old Tampa Yard continued to serve an Ardent Mills flour mill in Downtown Tampa until 2022, when the mill was relocated to Port Redwing. Old Tampa Yard and remaining track along Meridian Avenue to Tampa Union Station was removed in 2023.

== See also ==
- List of CSX Transportation lines
