= Lakeland Subdivision =

CSX railroad line in Florida

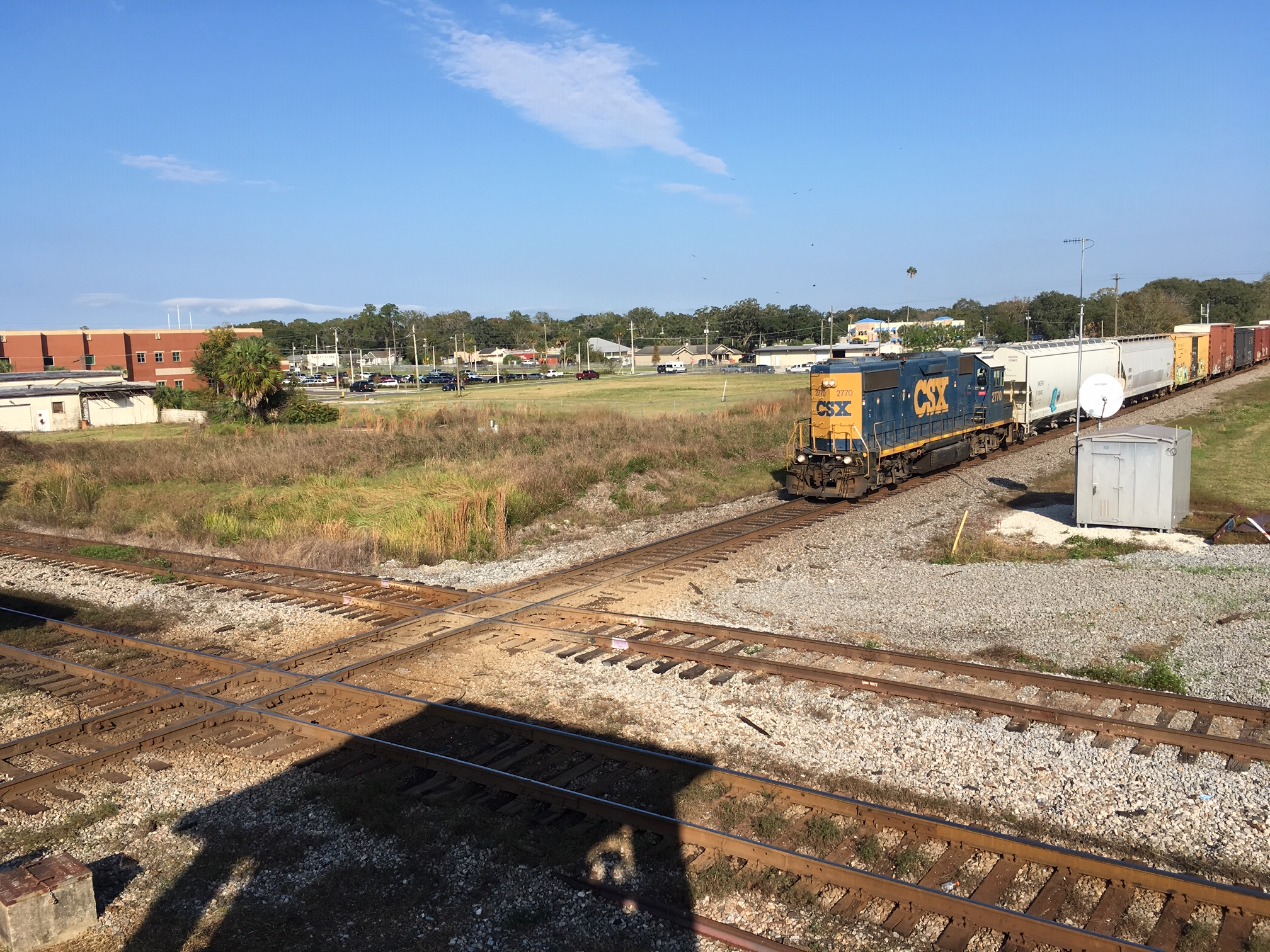
CSX Train O709 approaching Plant City Interlocking on the Lakeland Subdivision.

The Lakeland Subdivision is a CSX Transportation rail line in Florida. It runs along CSX's A Line from just west of Lakeland and heads west through Plant City to the community of Mango just east of Tampa.

The Lakeland Subdivision runs through the middle of Plant City, where it crosses CSX's other main line, the S Line (Yeoman Subdivision). This junction, known as Plant City Interlocking, is a particularly busy junction since all trains to and from Tampa must pass through this point. A train viewing platform is located at the junction for rail enthusiasts to observe passing trains. The platform is part of the Robert W. Willaford Railroad Museum which operates in the historic Plant City Union Depot.

== Route description ==
The Lakeland Subdivision begins just west of Downtown Lakeland at Lakeland Junction. At Lakeland Junction, the Vitis Subdivision runs to the north while the A Line continues east as the Carters Subdivision. The Lakeland Subdivision heads west and passes through Winston about 3 miles west of Lakeland Junction. In Winston, the line passes the entrance to Winston Yard, which also leads to the Bone Valley Subdivision. West of Winston, the line pases through Plant City, where the Lakeland Subdivision crosses the S Line (Yeoman Subdivision) at Plant City Interlocking. It then passes through Dover and Seffner to Mango, where the A Line enters the Tampa Terminal Subdivision.

== Operation ==
Amtrak's Floridian runs the Lakeland Subdivision round-trip twice a day to reach Tampa. Freight traffic on the Lakeland Subdivision includes local freight and intermodal traffic to Uceta Yard, which is CSX's intermodal facility in Tampa. Freight trains also run to Winston Yard daily, which is the east entrance to CSX's routes in the Bone Valley phosphate region.

== History ==
The Lakeland Subdivision first began service in 1884 and was built as part of Henry B. Plant's South Florida Railroad. The South Florida Railroad was absorbed by the Atlantic Coast Line Railroad (ACL) in 1902 and it became part ACL's main line.

The Atlantic Coast Line became the Seaboard Coast Line Railroad (SCL) after merging with the Seaboard Air Line Railroad in 1967. The former Atlantic Coast Line main line was then known as the A Line. The Seaboard Coast Line also adopted the Seaboard Air Line's method of naming their lines as subdivisions. The line was designated as the Lakeland Subdivision, which initially ran the A Line from Tampa as far north as Sanford.

The Seaboard Coast Line became CSX Transportation in 1986. In the late 1980s, the Lakeland Subdivision was truncated at Lakeland Junction, with the A Line east becoming the Carters Subdivision.

== See also ==
- List of CSX Transportation lines
