= Schultz Preserve =

Nature preserve, United States of America

- Location within Florida
- Location: Tampa, Florida
- Coordinates: 27.8119°N 82.3985°W
- Area: 120-acre (0.49 km^{2})
- Operator: Hillsborough County

Schultz Preserve is a 120-acre nature preserve south of Gibsonton, Florida in Hillsborough County, Florida. It is managed by Hillsborough County and includes estuarine and freshwater wetlands, artificial reefs, and coastal lands in the northern part of Port Redwing. It was purchased by Southwest Florida Water Management District in 1995 and restored. Oyster bars and seagrasses have returned. It is named for Tampa Bay's first Audubon Society game warden. and is maintained by Hillsborough County. The area offers picnicking, fishing, canoeing, kayaking, snorkeling, bird watching and nature study opportunities. The preserve is part of the Alafia River watershed. It is being considered for a ferry terminal.
