= Yeoman Subdivision =

CSX railroad line in Florida

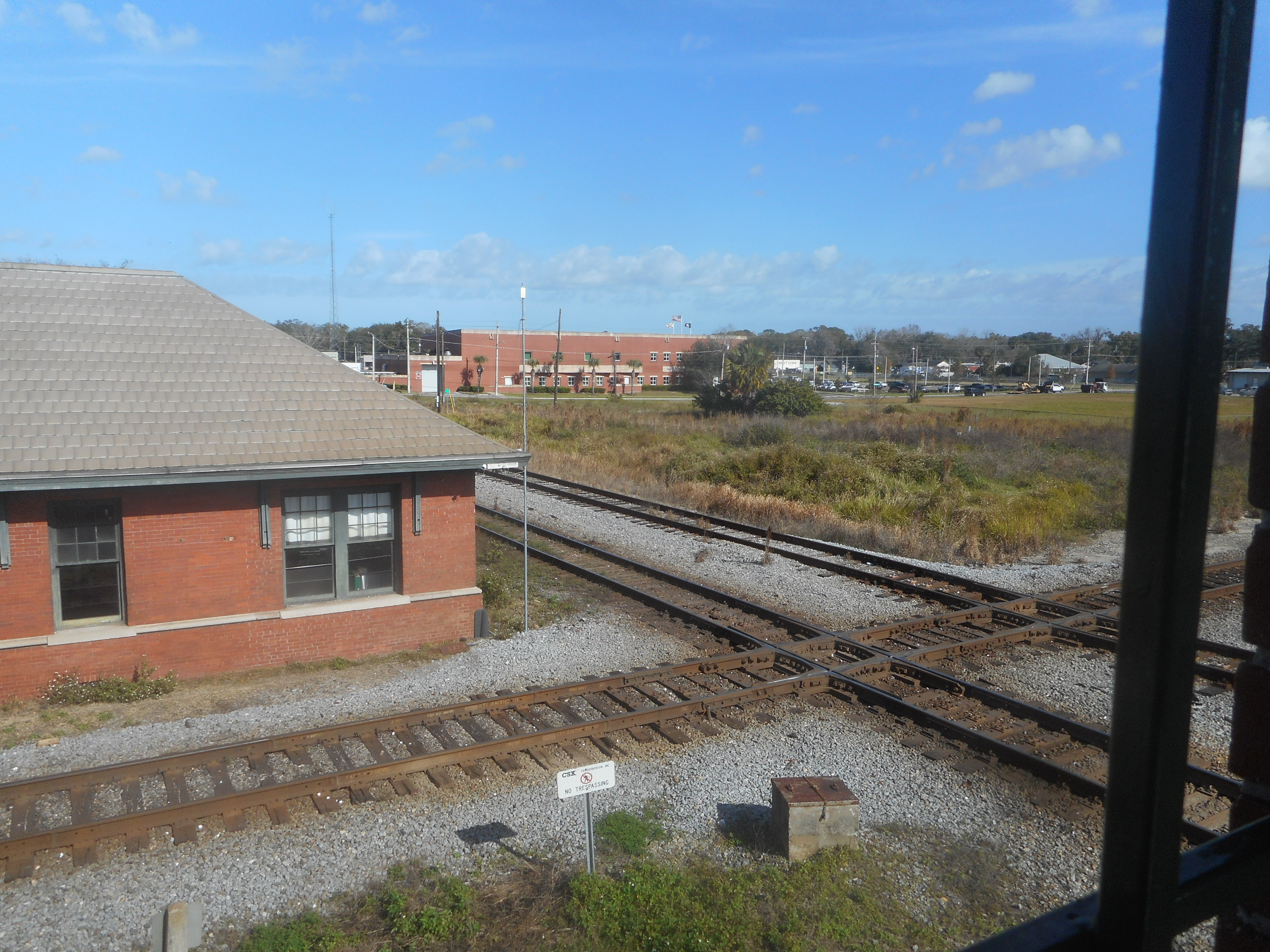
Yeoman Subdivision at Plant City Interlocking

The Yeoman Subdivision is a railroad line owned by CSX Transportation in Florida. It runs along CSX's S Line from Zephyrhills south to just east of Tampa, a distance of 31.2 miles. The S Line was previously the main line of the Seaboard Air Line Railroad, a CSX predecessor.

The line notably passes through Plant City where it crosses CSX's other main line, the A Line (Lakeland Subdivision). This junction, known as Plant City Interlocking, is a particularly busy junction since all trains to and from Tampa must pass through this point. A train viewing platform is located at the junction for rail enthusiasts to observe passing trains. The platform is part of the Robert W. Willaford Railroad Museum which operates in the former Plant City Union Depot.

== Route description ==
The Yeoman Subdivision begins in Zephyrhills where it continues south from the Wildwood Subdivision. From here it heads south along CSX's S Line in a nearly straight line to Plant City. In Downtown Plant City, it connects with the Plant City Subdivision. The two legs of the wye connecting to the Plant City Subdivision are known as Sandler Junction on the north leg and Lake Wales Junction on the south leg. Just south of Sandler Junction, the Yeoman Subdivision crosses CSX's A Line (Lakeland Subdivision) at Plant City Interlocking.

From Plant City, the Yeoman Subdivision turns west to Tampa, passing through Valrico and Brandon. The Yeoman Subdivision ends at the control point YN just east of Yeoman Yard in Tampa. The S Line continues into Yeoman Yard as the Tampa Terminal Subdivision.

== Operation ==
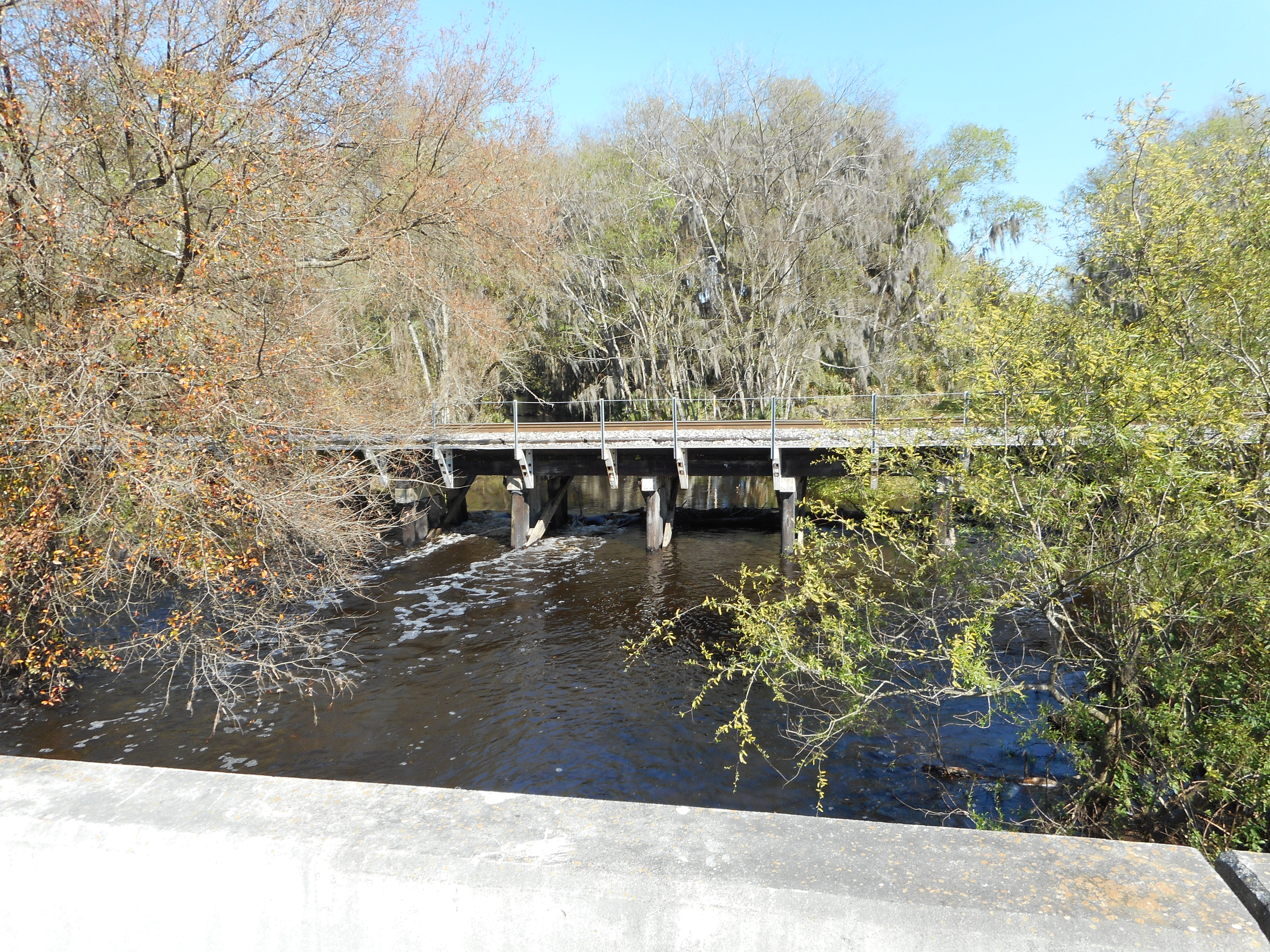
Yeoman Subdivision bridge over Blackwater Creek

The Yeoman Subdivision is CSX's main route for freight to Tampa's Yeoman Yard. Large amounts of phosphate traffic also run from the Valrico Subdivision in Valrico east to Tampa for shipping.

== History ==
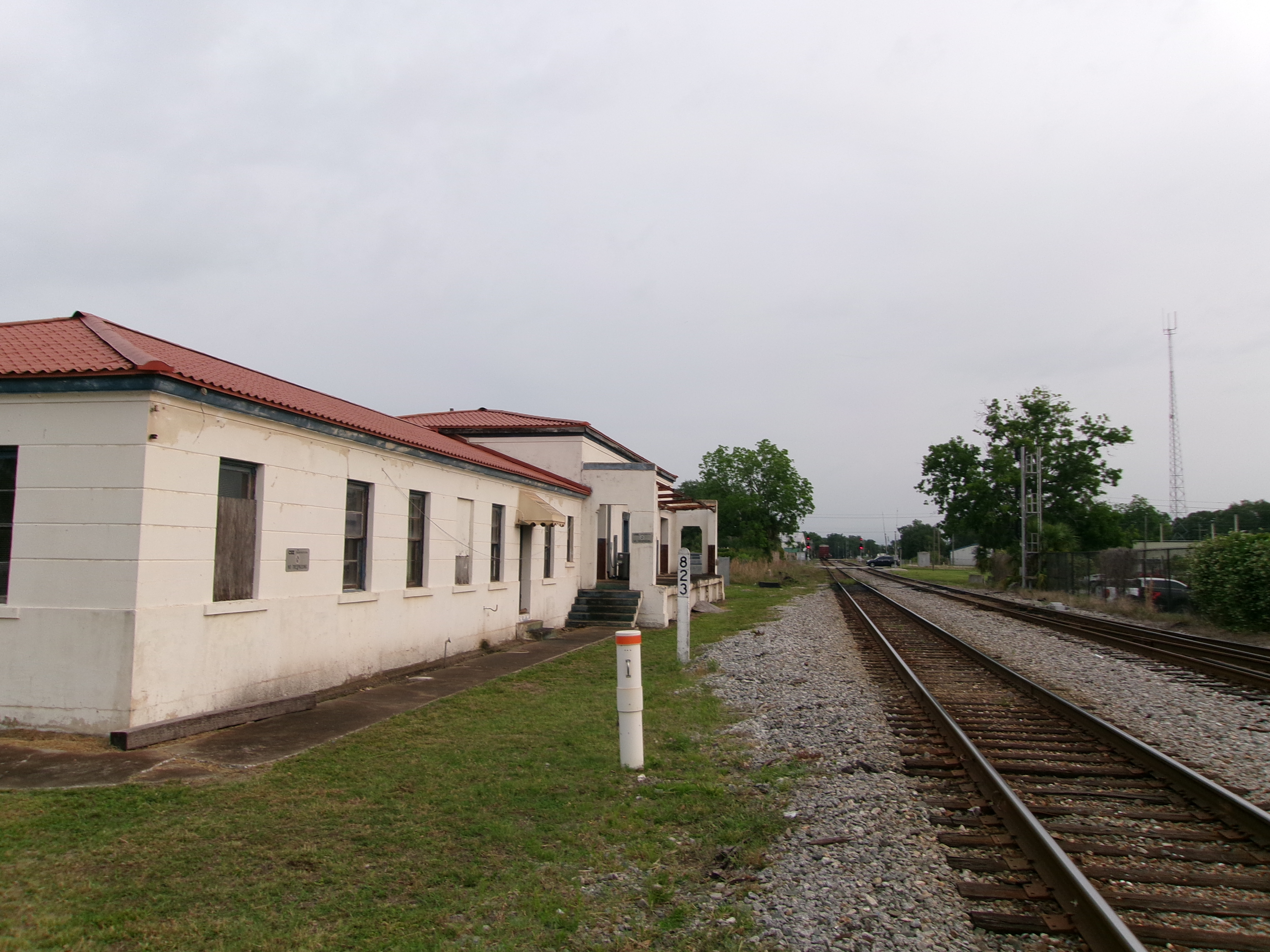
Yeoman Subdivision passes by the former REA Express House in Plant City

The Yeoman Subdivision was built in 1890 by the Florida Central and Peninsular Railroad. The line would later become the main line of the Seaboard Air Line Railroad, who acquired the FC&P, in 1903. The Seaboard Air Line would designate this segment of the main line from Coleman to Tampa (along with track from Tampa to St. Petersburg) as the Tampa Subdivision. The line would serve a number of Seaboard Air Line passenger and freight trains.

The Seaboard Air Line merged with the Atlantic Coast Line Railroad in 1967 becoming the Seaboard Coast Line Railroad. After the merger, the line (then known as the S Line) was initially designated as the Coleman Subdivision as far north as Coleman. Though by 1970, the line was renamed to the Yeoman Subdivision when the S Line was abandoned between Zephyrhills and Owensboro. The current Wildwood Subdivision north of Zephyrhills was previously the Atlantic Coast Line's Vitis—Tampa Line.

The Seaboard Coast Line became CSX Transportation by 1986. The Yeoman Subdivision west of Tampa to St. Petersburg was later redesignated as the Clearwater Subdivision after Seaboard Coast Line became CSX.

== See also ==
- List of CSX Transportation lines
