= East Tampa, Florida =

- Unincorporated community
- Location within Florida Location within the United States
- Coordinates: 27°51′51″N 82°22′49″W
- Country: United States
- State: Florida
- County: Hillsborough
- Elevation: 11 ft (3.4 m)
- Time zone: UTC-5 (Eastern (EST))
  - Summer (DST): UTC-4 (EDT)
- ZIP code: 33619
- Area code: 813

East Tampa is an unincorporated community in Hillsborough County, Florida, United States. It is partially within the census-designated place (CDP) of Gibsonton. East Tampa is serviced by ZIP codes 33619 and 33578.

== Geography ==
East Tampa is located at 27.9 degrees north, 82.4 degrees west (27.8649, 82.38028); or about 11.8 miles southeast of Tampa. The elevation for the community is 11 feet above sea level.

East Tampa boundaries include the Alafia River and Gibsonton to the south, Interstate 75 to the east, and U.S. Highway 41 to the west. Riverview Drive runs through the center of the community from east to west.

== Major roads in East Tampa ==
Some of the major roads serving the community include:

- Riverview Drive
- U.S. Highway 41
- Interstate 75

== Education ==
The community of East Tampa is served by Hillsborough County Schools.
