= Fussels Corner, Florida =

Fussells Corner, Florida
- Census-designated place
- Location in Polk County and the state of Florida
- Coordinates: 28°03′33″N 81°52′12″W
- Country: United States
- State: Florida
- County: Polk

Area
  - Total: 5.52 sq mi (14.30 km^{2})
  - Land: 5.38 sq mi (13.93 km^{2})
  - Water: 0.14 sq mi (0.36 km^{2})
- Elevation: 112 ft (34 m)

Population (2020)
  - Total: 5,560
  - Density: 1,033.6/sq mi (399.06/km^{2})
- Time zone: UTC-5 (Eastern (EST))
  - Summer (DST): UTC-4 (EDT)
- FIPS code: 12-25125
- GNIS feature ID: 2402511

Fussells Corner is a census-designated place (CDP) in Polk County, Florida, United States. As of the 2020 census, Fussells Corner had a population of 5,560. It is part of the Lakeland–Winter Haven Metropolitan Statistical Area.

== Geography ==
According to the United States Census Bureau, the CDP has a total area of 7.1 square miles (18 km^{2}), all land.

== Demographics ==
Historical population
Census	Pop.	Note	%±
1990	3,840		—
2000	5,313		38.4%
2020	5,560		—

=== 2020 census ===
As of the 2020 census, Fussels Corner had a population of 5,560. The median age was 58.2 years. 15.5% of residents were under the age of 18 and 38.4% of residents were 65 years of age or older. For every 100 females there were 94.8 males, and for every 100 females age 18 and over there were 92.6 males age 18 and over.

98.8% of residents lived in urban areas, while 1.2% lived in rural areas.

There were 2,546 households in Fussels Corner, of which 17.6% had children under the age of 18 living in them. Of all households, 48.0% were married-couple households, 16.9% were households with a male householder and no spouse or partner present, and 26.9% were households with a female householder and no spouse or partner present. About 29.0% of all households were made up of individuals and 19.3% had someone living alone who was 65 years of age or older.

There were 3,101 housing units, of which 17.9% were vacant. The homeowner vacancy rate was 4.1% and the rental vacancy rate was 11.2%.

Racial composition as of the 2020 census
Race	Number	Percent
White	4,365	78.5%
Black or African American	254	4.6%
American Indian and Alaska Native	53	1.0%
Asian	21	0.4%
Native Hawaiian and Other Pacific Islander	1	0.0%
Some other race	413	7.4%
Two or more races	453	8.1%
Hispanic or Latino (of any race)	1,006	18.1%

=== 2000 census ===
As of the 2000 census, there were 5,313 people, 2,236 households, and 1,647 families residing in the CDP. The population density was 752.7 inhabitants per square mile (290.6/km^{2}). There were 2,989 housing units at an average density of 423.5 per square mile (163.5/km^{2}). The racial makeup of the CDP was 88.71% White, 5.44% African American, 0.36% Native American, 0.15% Asian, 0.04% Pacific Islander, 3.86% from other races, and 1.45% from two or more races. Hispanic or Latino of any race were 5.74% of the population.

There were 2,236 households, out of which 21.0% had children under the age of 18 living with them, 59.7% were married couples living together, 9.6% had a female householder with no husband present, and 26.3% were non-families. 20.8% of all households were made up of individuals, and 9.6% had someone living alone who was 65 years of age or older. The average household size was 2.38 and the average family size was 2.68.

In the CDP, the population was spread out, with 19.7% under the age of 18, 6.2% from 18 to 24, 21.8% from 25 to 44, 27.4% from 45 to 64, and 24.9% who were 65 years of age or older. The median age was 47 years. For every 100 females, there were 100.1 males. For every 100 females age 18 and over, there were 98.0 males.

The median income for a household in the CDP was $34,395, and the median income for a family was $41,263. Males had a median income of $26,145 versus $20,293 for females. The per capita income for the CDP was $17,998. About 8.6% of families and 13.7% of the population were below the poverty line, including 26.4% of those under age 18 and 4.5% of those age 65 or over.
