= Wildwood Subdivision =

CSX railroad line in Florida

The Wildwood Subdivision is a railroad line owned by CSX Transportation in Florida. It runs along CSX's S Line from Baldwin south to Zephyrhills via Ocala and Wildwood for a total of 155.7 miles. The S Line is CSX's designation for the line that was the Seaboard Air Line Railroad main line from 1903 to 1967.

== Route description ==
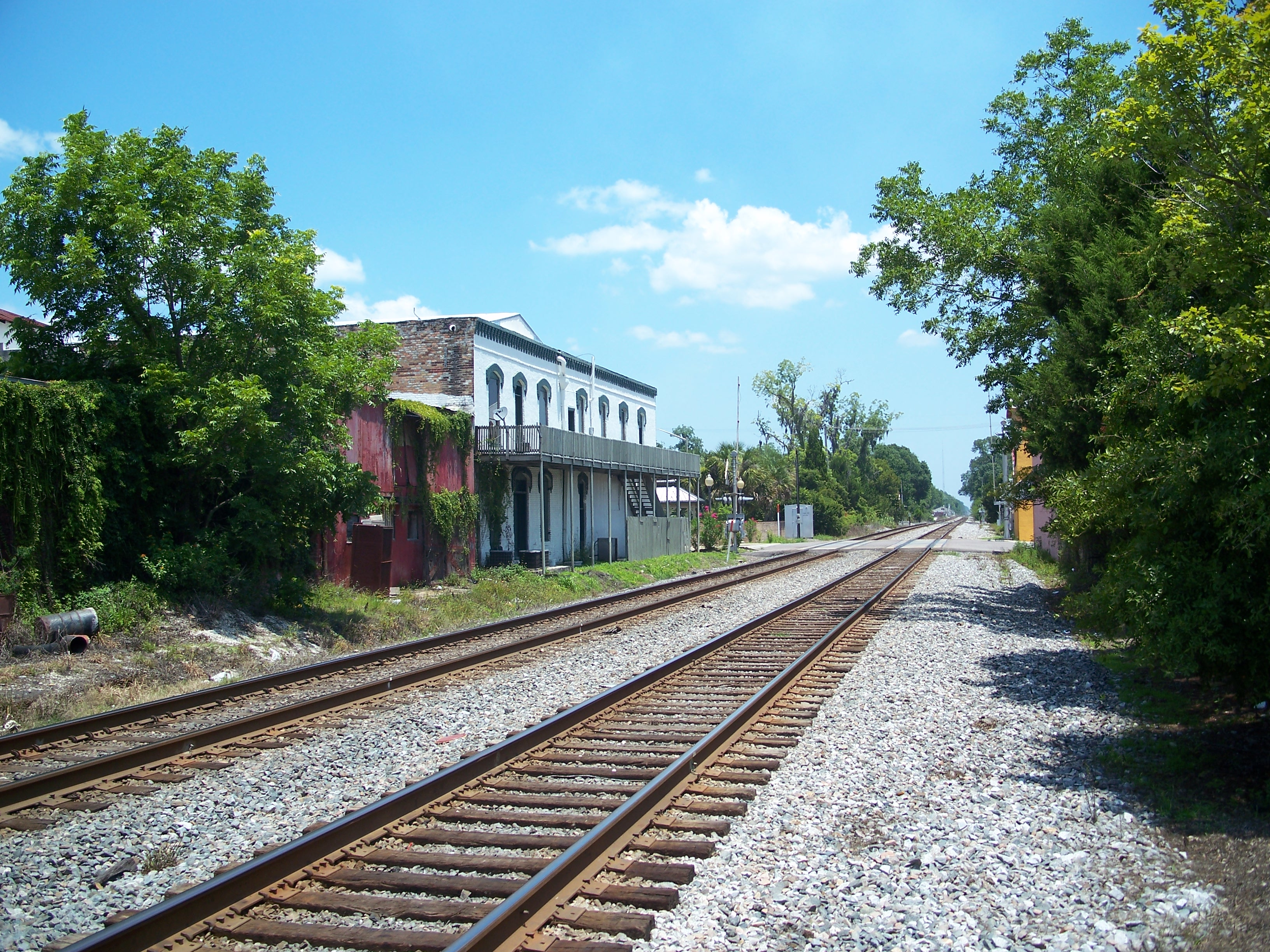
Wildwood Subdivision in Starke

The Wildwood Subdivision begins at Baldwin Junction in Baldwin. The line connects with CSX's Jacksonville Terminal Subdivision and Callahan Subdivision at Baldwin Junction, along with the Florida Gulf and Atlantic Railroad.

From Baldwin Junction, the Wildwood Subdivision heads south along CSX's S Line through Starke and Waldo to Ocala. It connects with CSX's Brooker Subdivision at Wannee Junction in Starke. In Ocala, the Wildwood Subdivision crosses the Florida Northern Railroad at the historic Ocala Union Station.

From Ocala, the Wildwood Subdivision continues south to Wildwood, where CSX operates a significant freight yard. South of Wildwood, the line continues through Coleman and Bushnell. Just south of Lacoochee at Owensboro, the Wildwood Subdivision turns south onto CSX's AR Line though Dade City to Vitis Junction. At Vitis Junction, the Wildwood Subdivision turns southwest while the Vitis Subdivision continues south. The Wildwood Subdivision ends in Zephyrhills, where the line continues south to Tampa as the Yeoman Subdivision.

== Operation ==
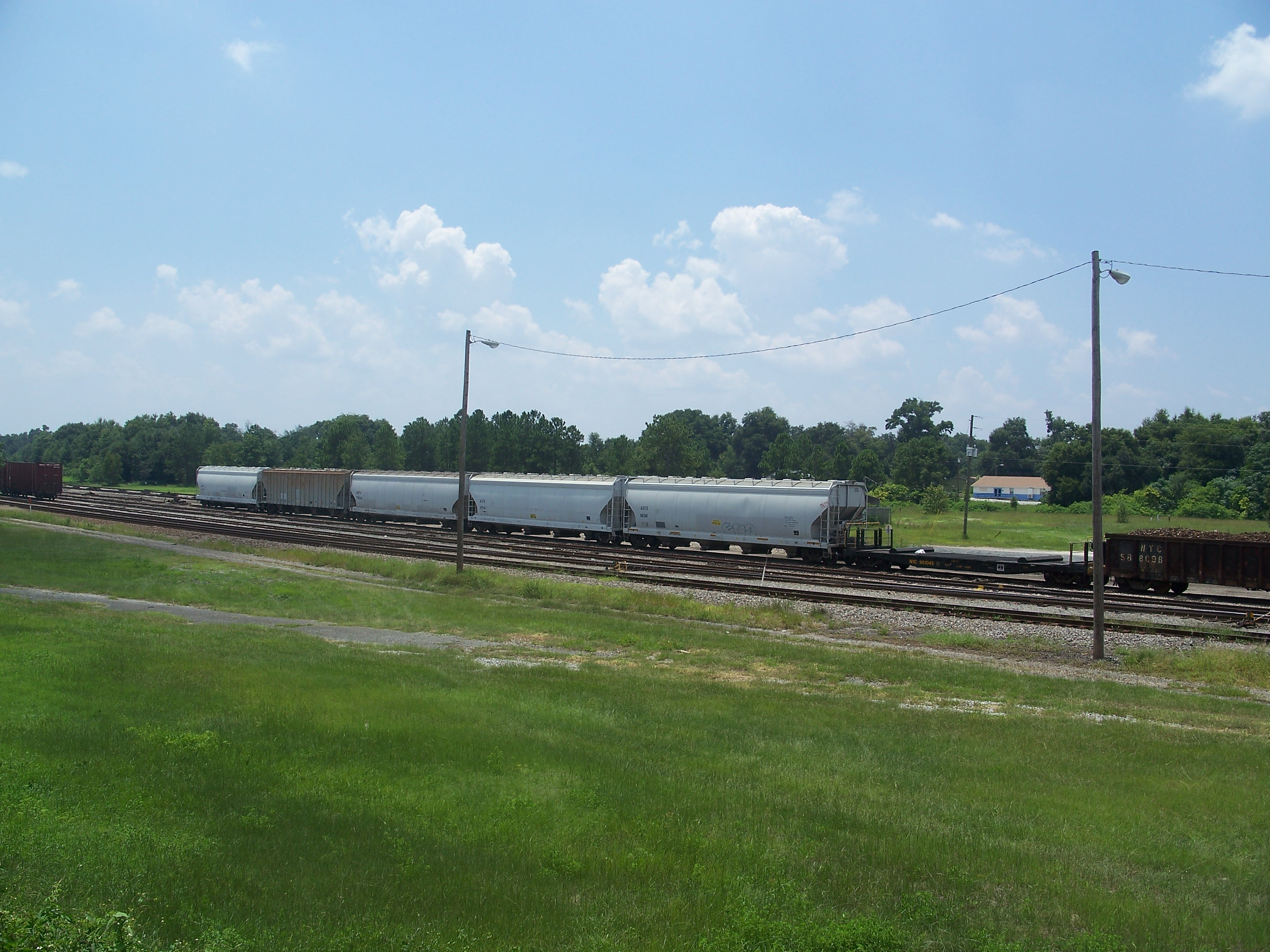
Wildwood Yard

The Wildwood Subdivision is used exclusively for freight and it CSX’s main freight route through Peninsular Florida. Freight trains bound for Tampa's Yeoman Yard generally run the full line to the Yeoman Subdivision while trains to Miami, Orlando, Tampa's Uceta Yard, and other areas of Southern Florida diverge on to the Vitis Subdivision at Vitis Junction.

The line is double tracked in many places to accommodate the large amount of freight traffic and is dispatched through a Centralized traffic control signal system. Some of the double track was installed in the mid 2010s to further increase capacity since through trains no longer use the adjacent A Line, which is now partially state owned.

Passenger service previously ran on the line, but it was discontinued completely in 2004 when Amtrak truncated the Palmetto to Savannah, Georgia.

There are two signifiacant yards along the Wildwood Subdivision: Baldwin Yard and Wildwood Yard.

== History ==
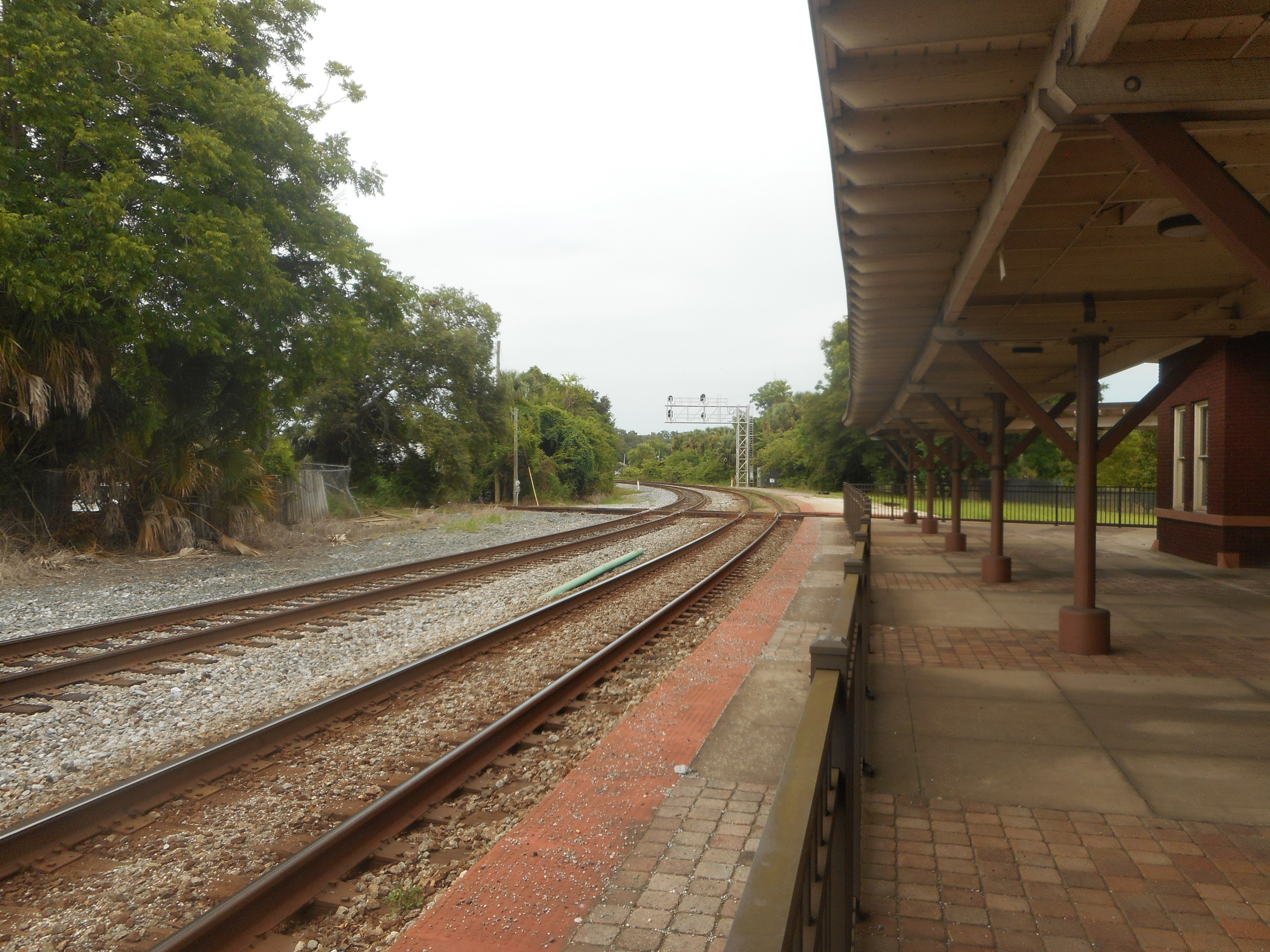
Wildwood Subdivision at the historic Ocala Union Station

=== Baldwin to Owensboro ===
The Wildwood Subdivision from Baldwin to Waldo was built in 1859 by the Florida Railroad, which historically ran from Fernandina Beach to Cedar Key (which was the first cross-state railroad route in Florida). From Waldo south to Ocala the line was originally part of the Peninsula Railroad and from Ocala south to Lacoochee (at a point previously known as Owensboro Junction) it was part of the Tropical Florida Railroad. All three of these railroads would be merged into the Florida Central and Peninsular Railroad, which would be bought by the Seaboard Air Line Railroad in 1903. The line became the Seaboard's main line. Early on, the Seaboard Air Line began classifying their lines as subdivisions (or "sub-divisions" as it was originally spelled on their employee timetables). Initially, the Wildwood Subdivision name was applied to the main line between Wildwood and Tampa, while the segment from Baldwin to Wildwood was designated as the Baldwin Subdivision. By 1927, the Wildwood Subdivision name was retired and the main line from Wildwood to Coleman was renamed the Miami Subdivision (which continued down the Seaboard's branch line from Coleman to Miami, which was complete in 1927). The remaining main line from Coleman to Tampa was then known as the Tampa Subdivision (which also included a branch line to St. Petersburg).

Baldwin Yard was the Seaboard Air Line's primary classification yard for the Jacksonville area. Wildwood Yard was historically a busy classification yard in the days of the Seaboard Air Line Railroad. From the 1920s to the 1980s, the yard was significant since the Seaboard's routes to Tampa, Orlando, and Miami diverged just to the south of the yard. Trains to Orlando previously turned on to the Seaboard's Orlando Subdivision just south of the yard (the north leg of the wye at the south end of the yard is all that remains of that connection). The Seaboard's Miami Subdivision diverged off the main line in Coleman, located 5 miles south of Wildwood. Trains to Tampa continued down the main line. Wildwood station still stands and is co-located in the yard, though passenger service has long been discontinued. In 2013, new double-tracked main lines were built to bypass the yard. The station's platforms were removed to accommodate this expansion.

=== Owensboro to Zephyrhills ===
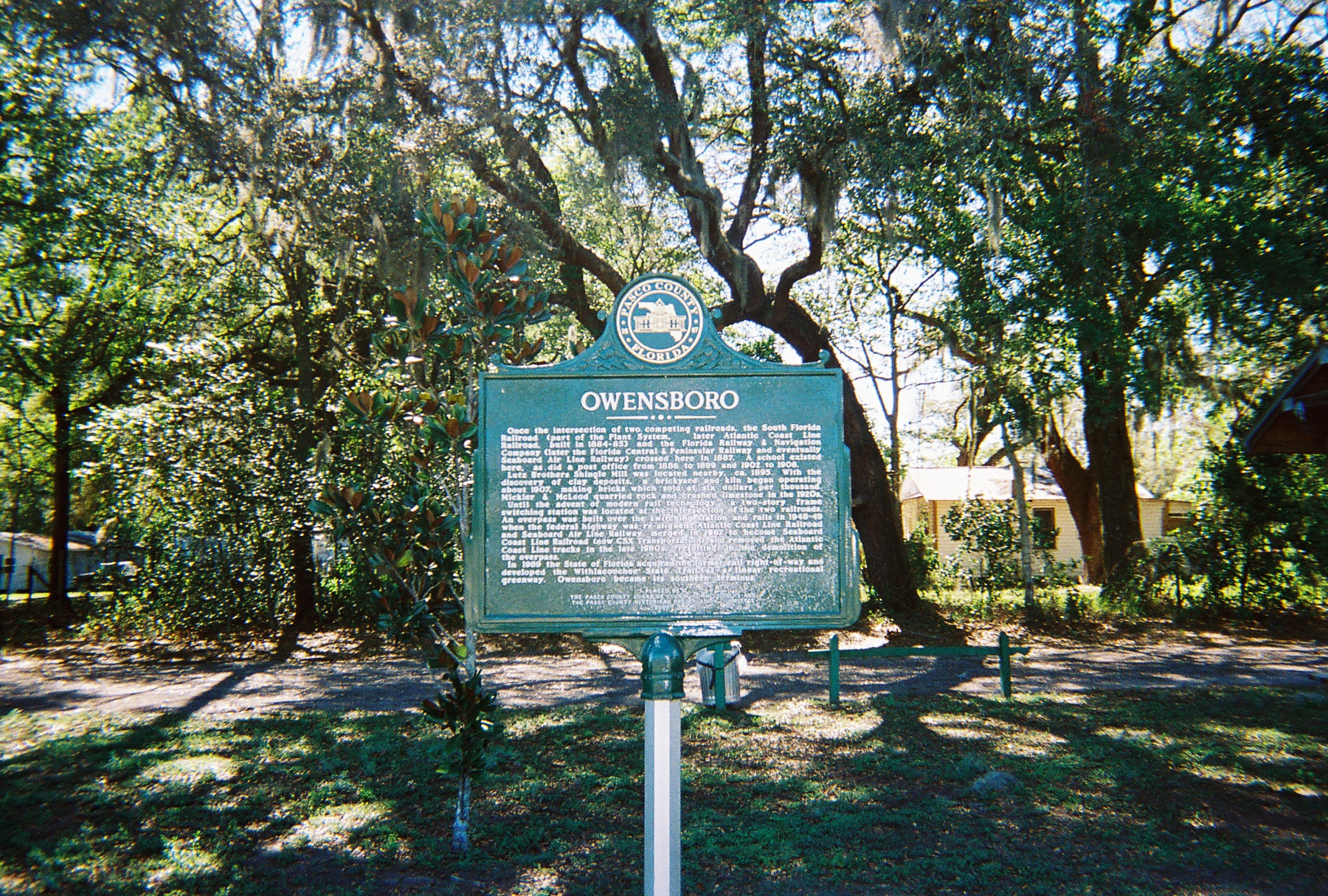
Historic plaque marking the former location of Owensboro Junction where the Atlantic Coast Line and Seaboard Air Line tracks crossed.

From Owensboro south to Vitis Junction, the Wildwood Subdivision was originally part of the South Florida Railroad's Pemberton Ferry Branch, which would become the Atlantic Coast Line Railroad's DuPont—Lakeland Line. From Vitis Junction south to Zephyrhills, the Wildwood Subdivision was the Atlantic Coast Line's Vitis—Tampa Line.

=== Merger and consolidation ===
The Seaboard line originally had its own alignment from Owensboro to Zephyrhills via Dade City, but that segment was abandoned in the early 1970s shortly after the Seaboard Air Line's 1967 merger with the Atlantic Coast Line Railroad. The abandonment was part of an effort to consolidate the merged network, which was named the Seaboard Coast Line Railroad. The Atlantic Coast Line route was kept in favor of the Seaboard route since is it went around the downtowns of Dade City and Zephyrhills. Despite its Atlantic Coast Line heritage, it is unofficially considered part of the S Line since it carries all S Line traffic (though, this segment still retains its ACL milepost numbering with AR and ARF prefixes).

A portion of the former SAL line in Dade City became the Hardy Trail in 2019.

After the merger, the line remained the Baldwin and Miami Subdivisions north of Coleman, but the remaining line from Coleman to Owensboro became the Coleman Subdivision. The ex-ACL segments were then part of the West Coast Subdivision.

In 1980, the Seaboard Coast Line's parent company merged with the Chessie System, creating the CSX Corporation. The CSX Corporation initially operated the Chessie and Seaboard Systems separately until 1986, when they were merged into CSX Transportation. The line was renamed the Wildwood Subdivision, a name the Seaboard Air Line used prior to 1926, from Baldwin and Zephyrhills by CSX after more of the West Coast Subdivision was abandoned in 1987. The Wildwood Subdivision and the rest of the S Line (CSX's designation for the former Seaboard Air Line main line) continues to be CSX's main route through peninsular Florida.

== See also ==
- List of CSX Transportation lines
