= Port Redwing =

Coordinates: 27.808921°N 82.407997°W

Port Redwing is a Port of Tampa facility near Gibsonton, Florida. The Port bought 110 acres in the area in 2012. A rail line connection to CSX mainline track is planned as well as roadway connections to Interstate 4 and the Lee Roy Selmon Expressway.

== See also ==
- Schultz Preserve
