= Winston, Florida =

- Former Census-designated place (CDP); Unincorporated community
- Location in Polk County and the state of Florida
- Coordinates: 28°2′20″N 82°0′12″W
- Country: United States
- State: Florida
- County: Polk

Area
  - Total: 5.4 sq mi (14.1 km^{2})
  - Land: 5.4 sq mi (14.1 km^{2})
  - Water: 0 sq mi (0 km^{2})
- Elevation: 138 ft (42 m)

Population (2000)
  - Total: 9,024
  - Density: 1,700/sq mi (640/km^{2})
- Time zone: UTC-5 (Eastern (EST))
  - Summer (DST): UTC-4 (EDT)
- Area code: 863
- FIPS code: 12-78200
- GNIS feature ID: 0293419

Winston is a former census-designated place (CDP) in Polk County, Florida, United States. The population was 9,024 at the 2000 census. Most of the community's core is now part of neighboring Lakeland. It is part of the Lakeland–Winter Haven Metropolitan Statistical Area.

== Geography ==
Winston is located at 28°2′20″N 82°0′12″W (28.038998, -82.003472).

According to the United States Census Bureau, the CDP has a total area of 5.4 square miles (14 km^{2}), all land.

== Demographics ==
Historical population
Census	Pop.	Note	%±
1950	1,870		—
1960	3,323		77.7%
1970	4,505		35.6%
1980	9,315		106.8%
1990	9,118		−2.1%
2000	9,024		−1.0%

As of the census of 2000, there were 9,024 people, 3,293 households, and 2,265 families residing in the CDP. The population density was 1,656.2 inhabitants per square mile (639.5/km^{2}). There were 4,352 housing units at an average density of 798.7 units per square mile (308.4 units/km^{2}). The racial makeup of the CDP was 63.29% White, 25.61% African American, 0.61% Native American, 0.22% Asian, 0.01% Pacific Islander, 7.91% from other races, and 2.35% from two or more races. Hispanic or Latino of any race were 15.20% of the population.

There were 3,293 households, out of which 34.7% had children under the age of 18 living with them, 42.6% were married couples living together, 19.8% had a female householder with no husband present, and 31.2% were non-families. 24.6% of all households were made up of individuals, and 9.7% had someone living alone who was 65 years of age or older. The average household size was 2.74 and the average family size was 3.23.

In the CDP, the population was spread out, with 30.7% under the age of 18, 9.9% from 18 to 24, 27.0% from 25 to 44, 20.3% from 45 to 64, and 12.2% who were 65 years of age or older. The median age was 32 years. For every 100 females, there were 98.1 males. For every 100 females age 18 and over, there were 94.1 males.

The median income for a household in the CDP was $25,204, and the median income for a family was $28,307. Males had a median income of $25,368 as opposed to $18,484 for females. The per capita income for the CDP was $11,507. About 19.2% of families and 26.0% of the population were below the poverty line, including 37.4% of those under age 18 and 12.4% of those age 65 or over.
