= Auburndale, Florida =

- City
- City of Auburndale
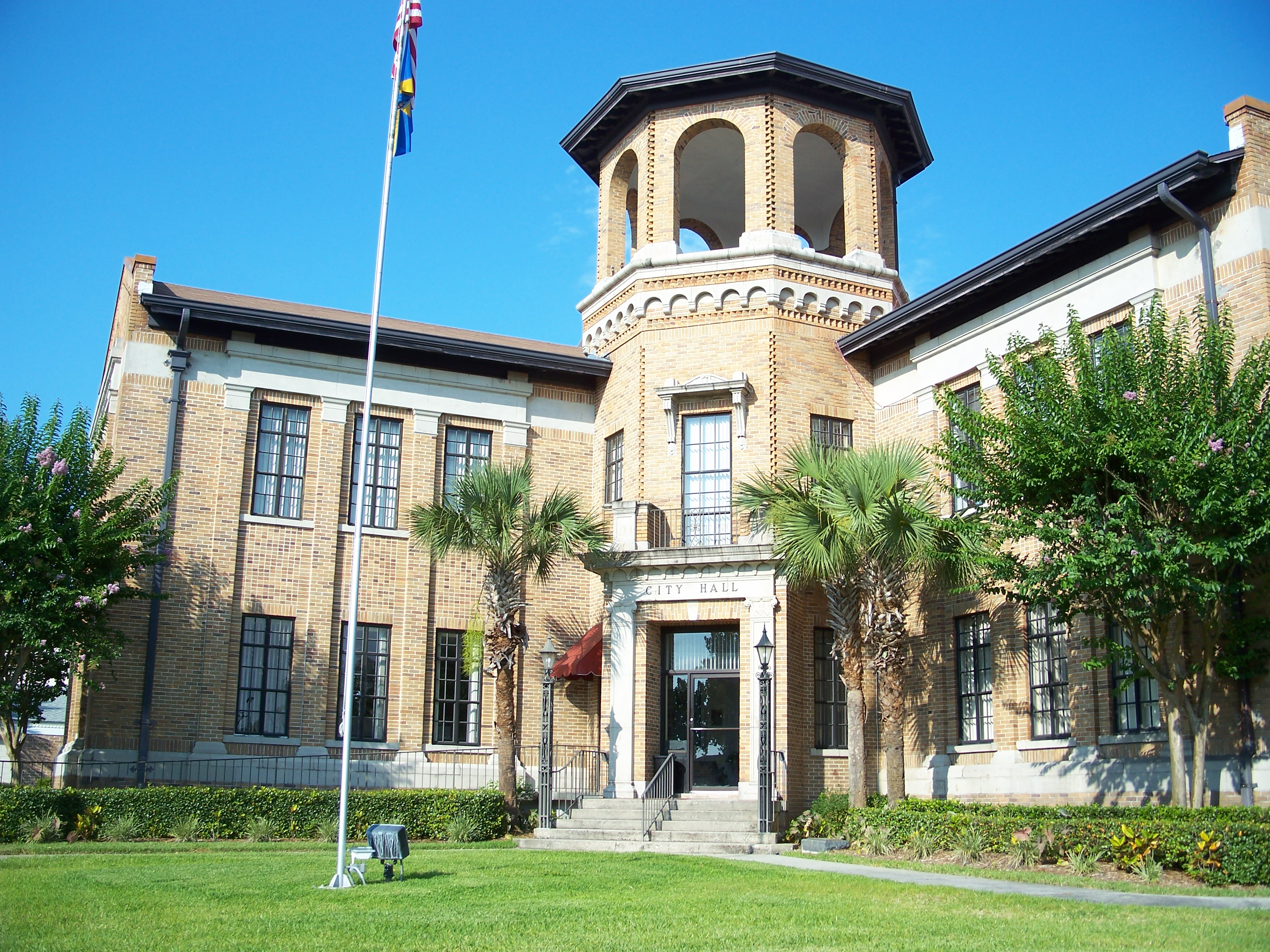
- The historic Auburndale City Hall as seen in June 2009.

- Flag Seal

- Location of Auburndale in Polk County, Florida.
- Coordinates: 28°05′46″N 81°48′04″W
- Country: United States
- State: Florida
- County: Polk
- Settled: 1880
- Incorporated: 1911

Area
  - Total: 20.58 sq mi (53.30 km^{2})
  - Land: 13.56 sq mi (35.12 km^{2})
  - Water: 7.02 sq mi (18.19 km^{2})
- Elevation: 141 ft (43 m)

Population (2020)
  - Total: 15,616
  - Estimate (2025): 21,369
  - Density: 1,152/sq mi (444.7/km^{2})
- Time zone: UTC-5 (Eastern EST)
  - Summer (DST): UTC-4 (EDT)
- ZIP code: 33823
- Area code: 863
- FIPS code: 12-02550
- GNIS feature ID: 2403135
- Website: www.auburndalefl.com

Auburndale is a city in Polk County, Florida, United States. It is part of the Lakeland-Winter Haven, Florida metropolitan statistical area. Its population was 15,616 at the 2020 census.

== History ==
Auburndale was founded in 1880 by Frank Fuller, who was seeking refuge from chilly winters in the Northeast United States. The place was originally named Sanatoria, from a hotel located there. When the railroad arrived in the 1880s, the town was renamed Auburndale at the suggestion of settlers from Auburndale, Massachusetts. The New England town had been named from the opening line of the poem "The Deserted Village" by Oliver Goldsmith. Early on, the city became a chosen destination for a number of America's most prominent artists.

== Geography and climate ==
The city is located 40 miles (64 km) northeast of Tampa and 59 miles (95 km) southwest of Orlando. Auburndale is located within the Central Florida Highlands area of the Atlantic Coastal Plain, with a terrain consisting of flatland interspersed with gently rolling hills.

According to the United States Census Bureau, the city has a total area of 9.3 square miles (24 km^{2}), of which 4.1 sq mi (11 km^{2}) (43.87%) are covered by water.

Auburndale is located in the humid subtropical zone, as designated by (Köppen climate classification: Cfa).

== Government ==
The city commission is made up of five commissioners elected from single-member districts. The mayor is elected from the commissioners by the voters. The city budget was $69 million in 2010.

== Demographics ==
Historical population
Census	Pop.	Note	%±
1920	715		—
1930	1,849		158.6%
1940	2,723		47.3%
1950	3,763		38.2%
1960	5,595		48.7%
1970	5,386		−3.7%
1980	6,501		20.7%
1990	8,858		36.3%
2000	11,032		24.5%
2010	13,507		22.4%
2020	15,616		15.6%
2025 (est.)	21,369	▲	36.8%
U.S. Decennial Census

=== Racial and ethnic composition ===
Auburndale racial composition (Hispanics excluded from racial categories) (NH = Non-Hispanic)
Race	Pop 2010	Pop 2020	% 2010	% 2020
White (NH)	9,679	9,709	71.66%	62.17%
Black or African American (NH)	1,677	1,908	12.42%	12.22%
Native American or Alaska Native (NH)	24	64	0.18%	0.41%
Asian (NH)	154	256	1.14%	1.64%
Pacific Islander or Native Hawaiian (NH)	0	7	0.00%	0.04%
Some other race (NH)	17	59	0.13%	0.38%
Two or more races/multiracial (NH)	185	693	1.37%	4.44%
Hispanic or Latino (any race)	1,771	2,920	13.11%	18.70%
Total	13,507	15,616	100%	100%

=== 2020 census ===
As of the 2020 census, Auburndale had a population of 15,616. The median age was 40.0 years. 23.6% of residents were under the age of 18 and 17.3% of residents were 65 years of age or older. For every 100 females there were 93.9 males, and for every 100 females age 18 and over there were 90.8 males age 18 and over.

98.8% of residents lived in urban areas, while 1.2% lived in rural areas.

There were 5,724 households in Auburndale, of which 34.7% had children under the age of 18 living in them. Of all households, 50.2% were married-couple households, 15.7% were households with a male householder and no spouse or partner present, and 26.6% were households with a female householder and no spouse or partner present. About 21.2% of all households were made up of individuals and 9.9% had someone living alone who was 65 years of age or older.

There were 6,295 housing units, of which 9.1% were vacant. The homeowner vacancy rate was 3.1% and the rental vacancy rate was 6.1%.

=== 2020 ACS 5-year estimates ===
In the 2020 ACS 5-year estimates, 3,701 families were residing in the city.

=== 2010 census ===
As of the 2010 United States census, 13,507 people, 4,671 households, and 3,327 families were living in the city.

=== 2000 census ===
As of the 2000 United States census, 11,032 people, 4,119 households, and 3,002 families resided in the city. The population density was 2,113.5 inhabitants per square mile (816.0/km^{2}). The 4,547 housing units had an average density of 871.1 per square mile (336.3/km^{2}). The racial makeup of the city was 81.13% White, 12.26% African American, 0.26% Native American, 0.88% Asian, 0.05% Pacific Islander, 3.46% from other races, and 1.96% from two or more races. Hispanics or Latinos of any race were 8.10% of the population.

In 2000, of the 4,119 households, 35.3% had children under 18 living with them, 52.1% were married couples living together, 15.7% had a female householder with no husband present, and 27.1% were not families. About 21.7% of all households were made up of individuals, and 9.8% had someone living alone who was 65 or older. The average household size was 2.63 and the average family size was 3.02.

The age distribution was 27.2% under 18, 9.0% from 18 to 24, 27.8% from 25 to 44, 20.8% from 45 to 64, and 15.3% who were 65 or older. The median age was 36 years. For every 100 females, there were 92.2 males. For every 100 females 18 and over, there were 89.6 males.

The median income for a household in the city was $34,184, and for a family was $36,303. Males had a median income of $30,468 versus $21,232 for females. The per capita income for the city was $15,510. About 13.4% of families and 17.3% of the population were below the poverty line, including 28.3% of those under 18 and 7.6% of those 65 or over.

== Transportation ==
The important freeways and highways in the Auburndale area are:

- I-4 - Just north of town, this is the main interstate highway in central Florida, leading westward to Lakeland and Tampa, and eastward to Orlando and Daytona Beach.
- SR 570 (Polk Parkway) - This toll road provides Auburndale with quick access to I-4 to the north, and leads westward to southern Lakeland.
- US 92 - This divided highway leads westward to Lakeland and eastward to Lake Alfred.
- SR 544 - This road traverses from eastern Auburndale to Winter Haven, hence its name Havendale Boulevard.
- SR 559 - This road leads to Polk City and I-4.

=== Mass transit ===
Auburndale is served by Winter Haven Area Transit's #12 and #50 routes.

Railroads are also important to Auburndale. The city contains two major railroad lines. The first being the CSX Carters Subdivision, and the other being the CSX Auburndale Subdivision. Amtrak uses both lines but does not stop in the city.

=== Airports ===
Two airports serve Auburndale, both of which are located in Winter Haven, east of the city: Winter Haven Regional Airport along US 92 and the adjacent Jack Browns Seaplane Base located on the northeast shores of Lake Jessie.

== Media ==
Auburndale is part of the Tampa/St. Pete television market, the 13th-largest in the country and part of the local Lakeland/Winter Haven radio market, which is the 94th-largest in the country.

== Library ==
The Auburndale Public Library is a member of the Polk County Library Cooperative. The library is located at 100 West Bridgers Avenue. The library offers a number of services to all Polk County residents, including 24/7 card catalog access.

== Education ==
The public schools in Auburndale are operated by the Polk County School Board. The five elementary schools are Berkley Elementary (a charter school ), Auburndale Central Elementary, Lena Vista Elementary, Boswell Elementary, and Caldwell Elementary, which feed into Stambaugh Middle School. Students from Berkley Elementary are admitted into Berkley Accelerated Middle School (another charter school), while other students wishing to apply are put on a waiting list. Auburndale High School and Berkley Advanced Studies Academy are the only high schools in Auburndale, although nearby Tenoroc High School serves students in both Auburndale and Lakeland.

Southern Technical College operates a campus in Auburndale. Nearby Lakeland, Florida has the main campus of Florida Polytechnic University.
