= Paradise Heights =

Paradise Heights may refer to:

- Paradise Heights, Florida, a town in the United States
- Paradise Heights, a BBC TV series, subsequently known as The Eustace Bros.
