= ChampionsGate, Florida =

- Unincorporated community
- ChampionsGate
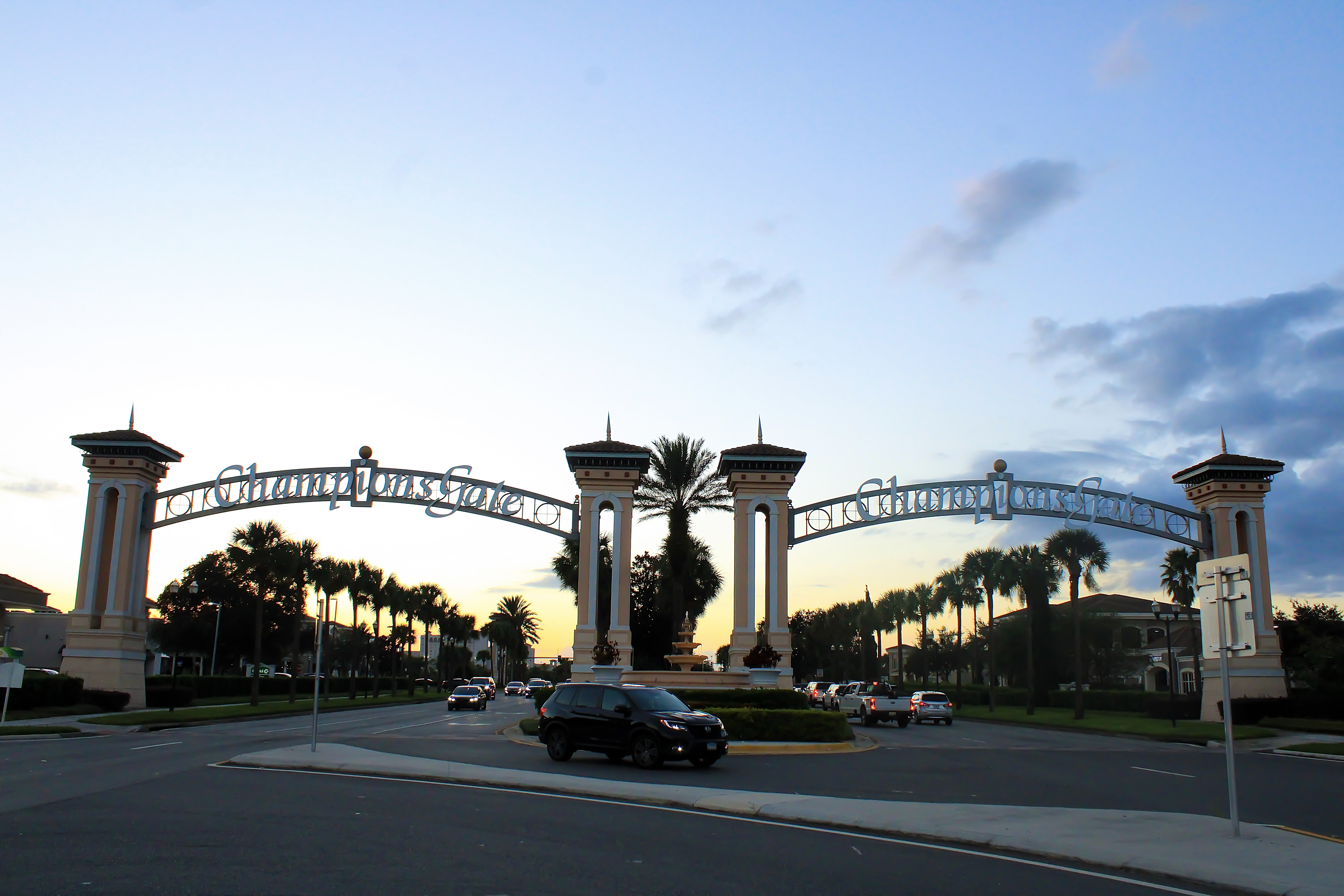
- Main entrance to ChampionsGate on Osceola Polk Line Road

- Location of ChampionsGate in Florida
- Country: United States
- State: Florida
- County: Osceola
- Established: 1998
- Time zone: UTC-5 (Eastern (EST))
  - Summer (DST): UTC-4 (EDT)
- ZIP code: 33896
- Area codes: 407

ChampionsGate is an unincorporated master-planned community in Four Corners, Florida. It is part of the Orlando–Kissimmee Metropolitan Statistical Area. The ChampionsGate Community Development District was formed in 1998.

== Sports and recreation ==
ChampionsGate (International) is a golf course in ChampionsGate designed by Greg Norman.
