= Greater Orlando =

- Metropolitan statistical area
- Orlando–Kissimmee–Sanford, Florida Metropolitan Statistical Area
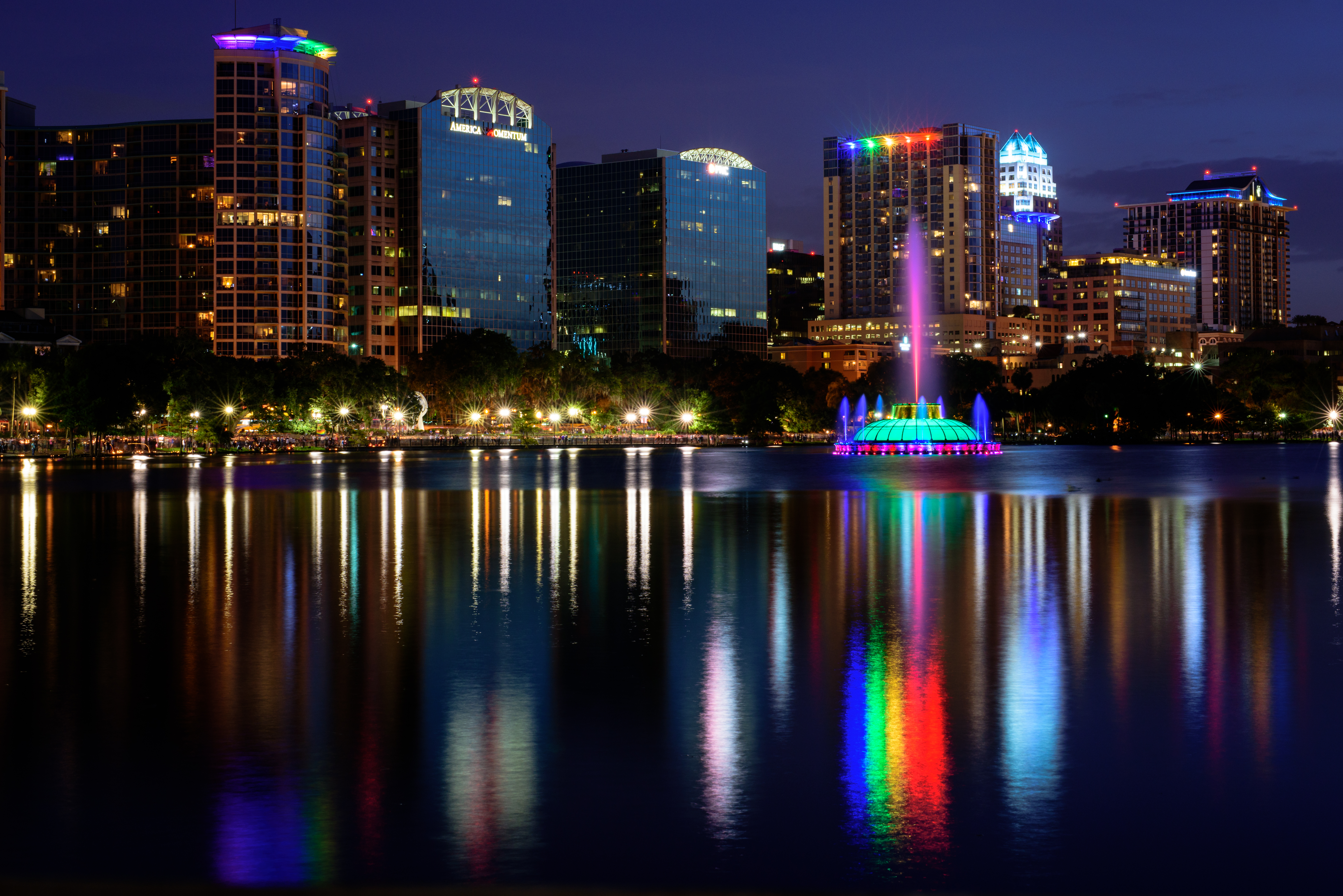
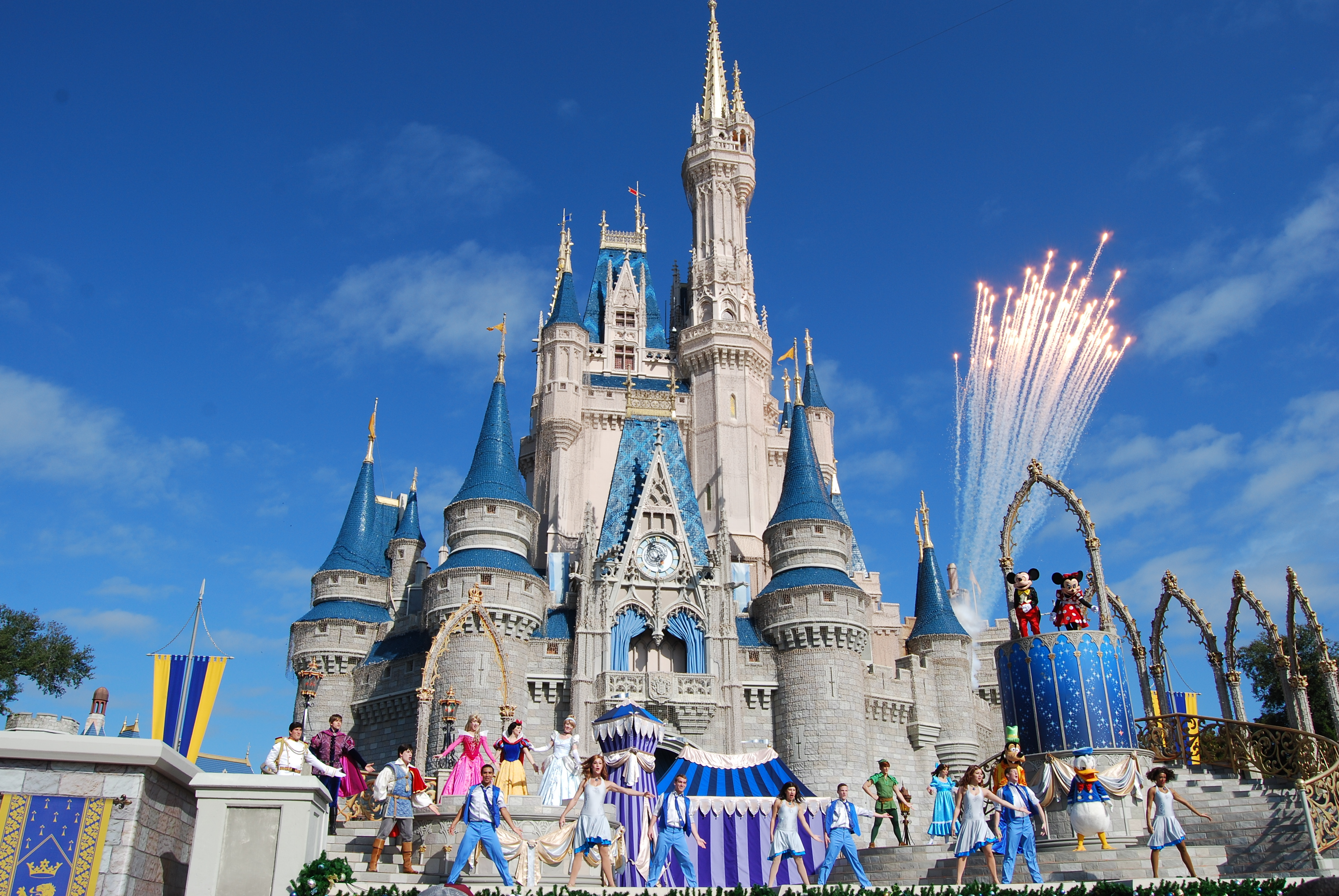
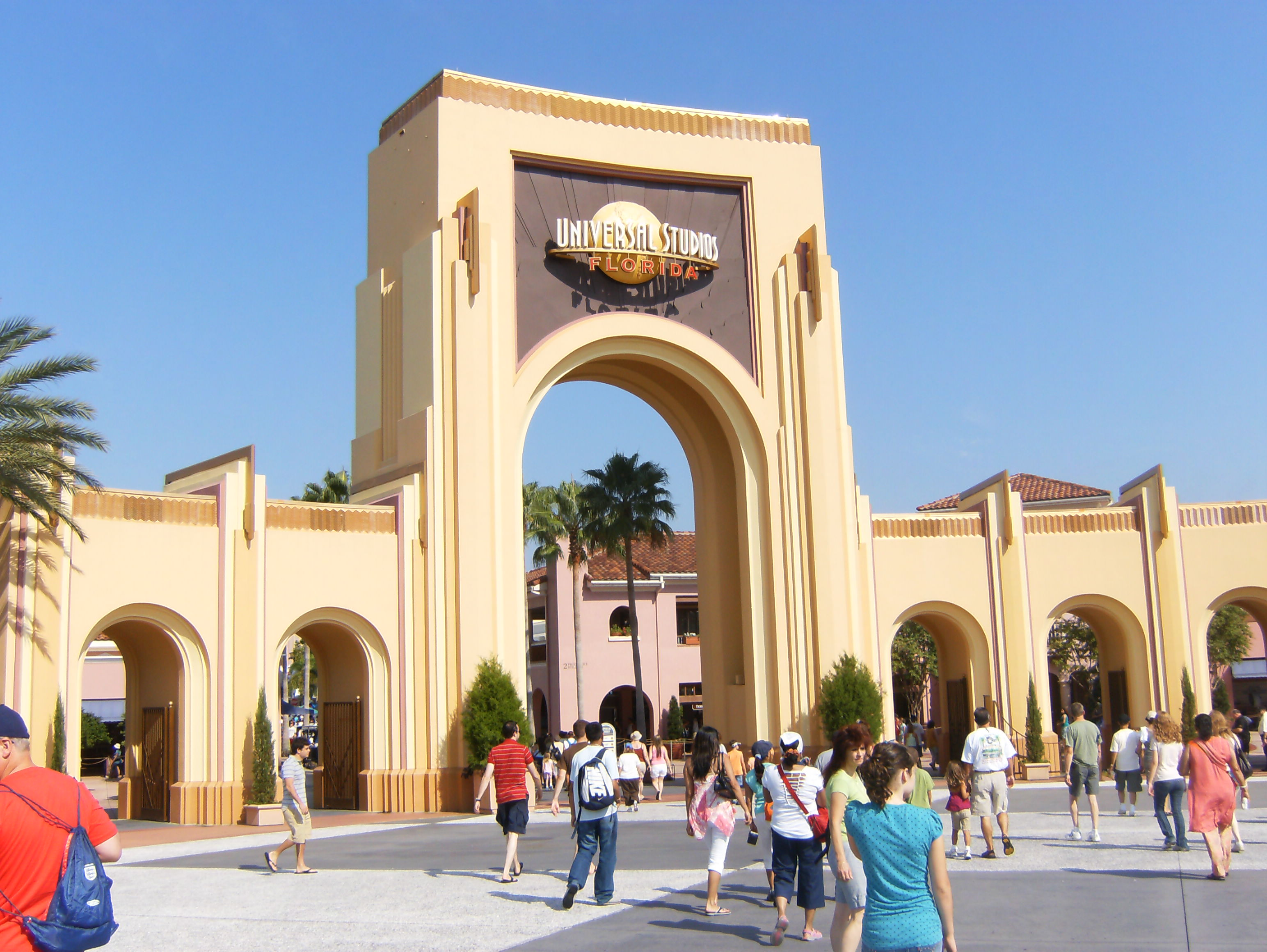
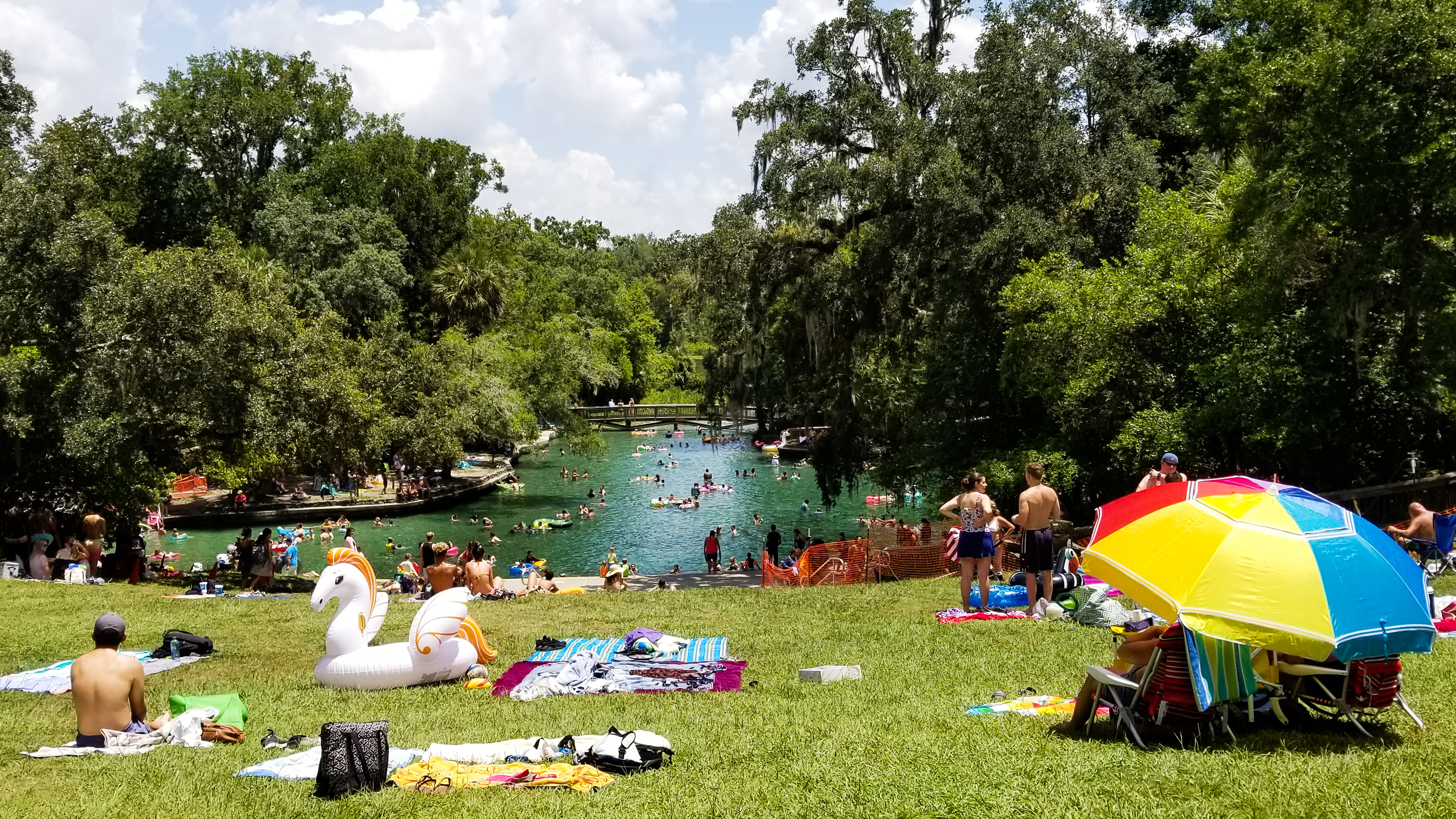
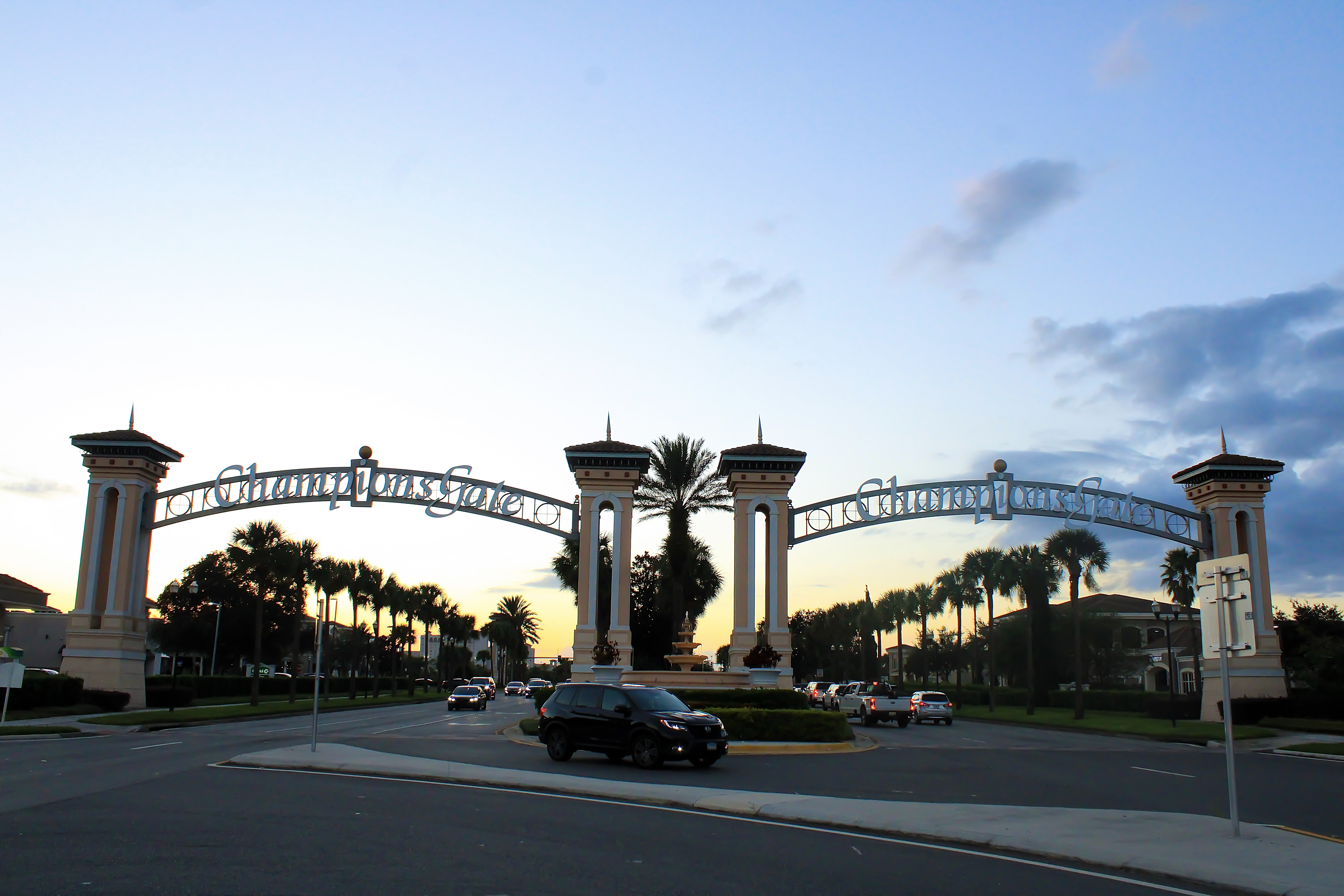
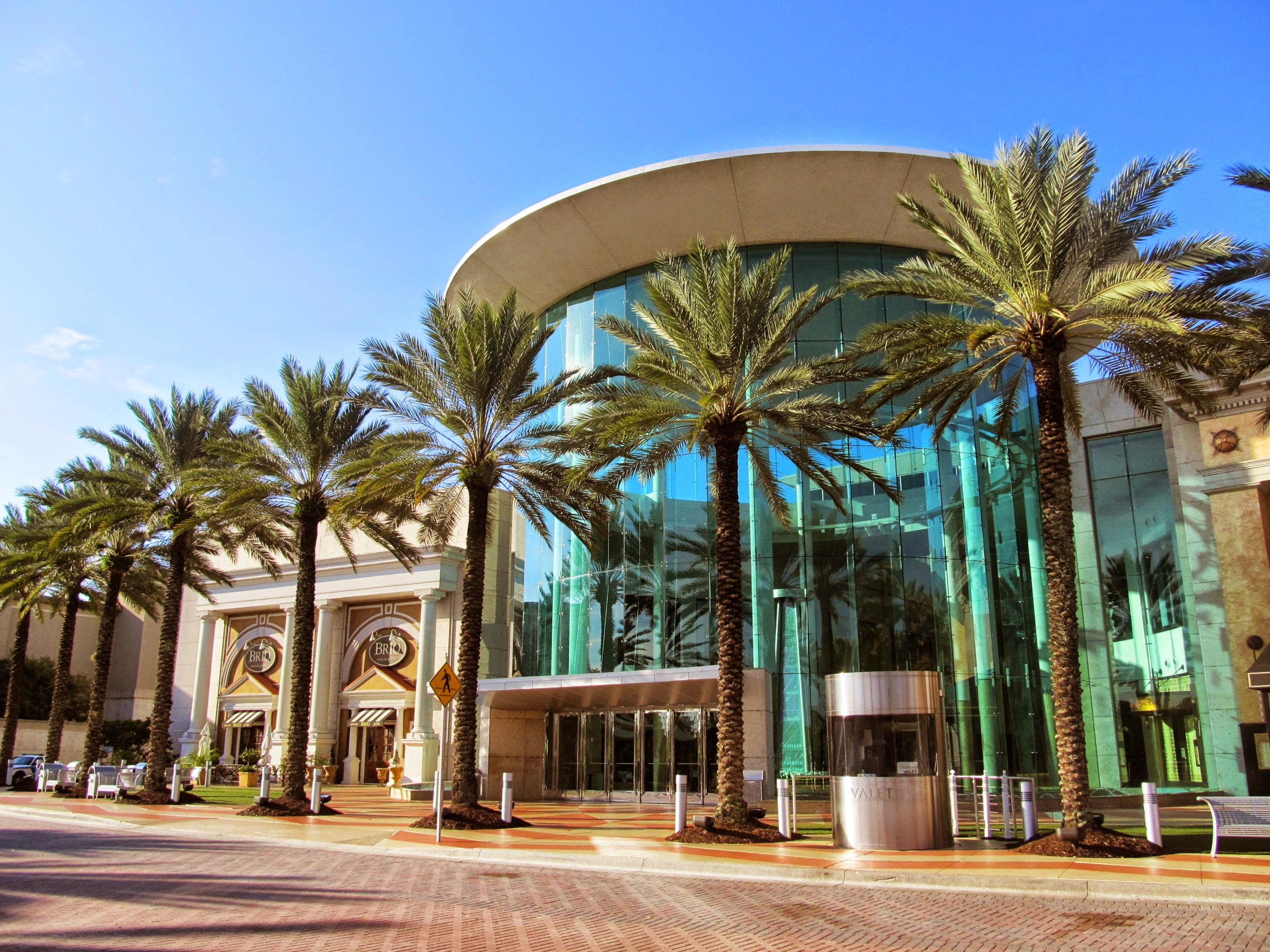
- Lake Eola within Downtown Orlando Walt Disney World Universal Studios Florida Wekiwa Springs Kissimmee ChampionsGate The Mall at Millenia

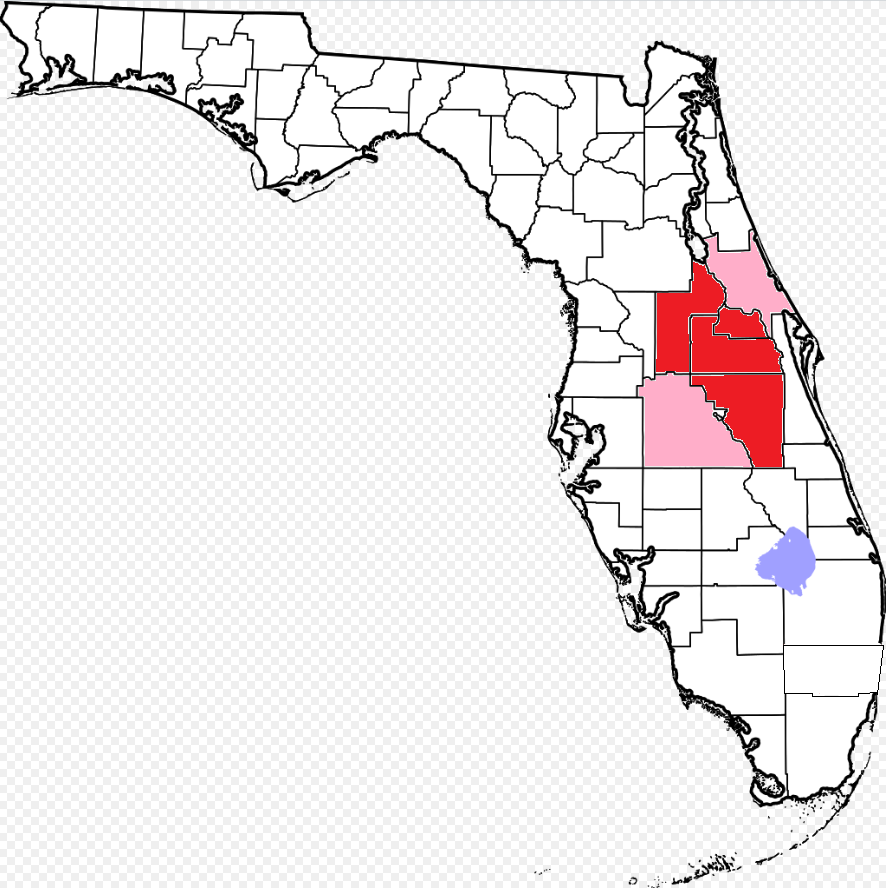
- Greater Orlando with counties with many suburbs (in dark red) and counties with few suburbs (in light red)
- Interactive map of Greater Orlando
- Coordinates: 28°32′N 81°23′W
- Country: United States
- State(s): Florida
- Largest city: Orlando
- Other cities: Kissimmee; Sanford; Saint Cloud; Winter Garden; Daytona Beach; Deltona; Winter Park; Windermere; Apopka; Ocoee; Casselberry; Oviedo; Clermont; Winter Springs; Altamonte Springs; Lake Mary; Leesburg; Bay Lake; Lake Buena Vista; Longwood

Area
  - Total: 4,011 sq mi (10,390 km^{2})
- Highest elevation: 312 ft (95 m)
- Lowest elevation: 0 ft (0 m)

Population (2020)
  - Total: 2,673,376
  - Rank: 22nd in the U.S.
  - Density: 666.5/sq mi (257.3/km^{2})

GDP
  - Total: $217.038 billion (2023)
  - Per capita: $81,185 (2023)

The Orlando metropolitan area (officially, for U.S. census purposes, the Orlando–Kissimmee–Sanford, Florida metropolitan statistical area, MSA) is an inland metropolitan area in the central region of the U.S. state of Florida. Its principal cities are Orlando, Kissimmee, and Sanford. The U.S. Office of Management and Budget defines it as consisting Lake, Orange (including Orlando), Osceola, and Seminole counties.

According to the 2020 U.S. census, the population of Greater Orlando is 2,673,376, an increase of nearly 540,000 new residents between 2010 and 2020.

By population, it is the third-largest metropolitan area in Florida, the seventh-largest in the Southeastern United States, and the 22nd-largest in the United States. The MSA encompasses 4,012 square miles (10,400 km^{2}) of total area (both land and water areas).

== Definitions ==
The Orlando–Kissimmee–Sanford MSA is further listed by the U.S. Office of Management and Budget as part of the Orlando–Lakeland–Deltona, Florida combined statistical area (CSA). This includes the Deltona–Daytona Beach–Ormond Beach (Volusia and Flagler Counties), Lakeland-Winter Haven (Polk County), and Wildwood-The Villages (Sumter County) MSAs. As of the 2010 census, the Combined Statistical Area population was 3,447,946, with a 2018 estimate at 4,096,575.

The MSA was first defined in 1950 as the Orlando standard metropolitan area, consisting solely of Orange County. Seminole County was added to the MSA in 1959, Osceola County in 1973, and Lake County in 1992. The name was changed to Orlando–Kissimmee MSA in 2004, and to Orlando–Kissimmee–Sanford MSA in 2009.

== Climate and geography ==
=== Climate ===
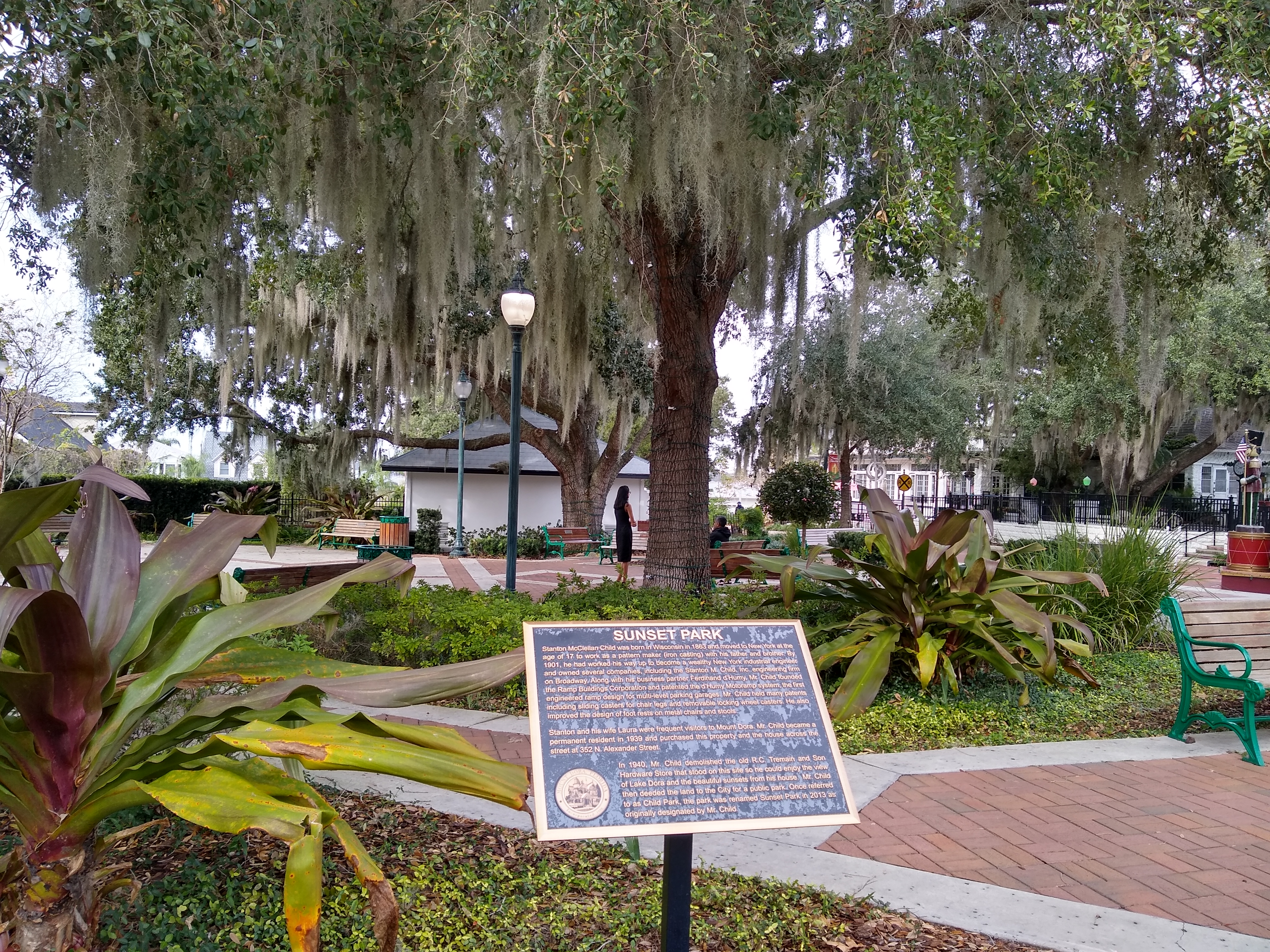
Sunset Park in Mount Dora, Lake County

Like much of the Southern United States, according to the Köppen climate classification, Orlando has a humid subtropical climate (Cfa). The two basic seasons in the Orlando area are a hot and rainy season from May until late October (roughly coinciding with the Atlantic hurricane season), and a warm and dry season from November through April. The area's relatively low elevation and close proximity to the Tropic of Cancer are what accentuate the humidity during the summer months, when temperatures typically reach as high as the low 90s °F (32–34 °C), while daily high temperatures below the low 70s °F (22–24 °C) are pretty rare. The average window for 90 °F (32 °C) temperatures is April 9 to October 14. The area's humidity acts as a buffer, usually preventing actual temperatures from exceeding 100 °F (38 °C) but also pushing the heat index to over 110 °F (43 °C). The city's highest recorded temperature is 103 °F (39 °C), set on September 8, 1921. Strong afternoon thunderstorms are common daily during these months, caused by the air mass from the Gulf of Mexico and the Atlantic Ocean colliding over the region. These storms can be quite powerful, bringing heavy torrential downpours, powerful winds, and even damaging hail.

Humidity cools off during the winter months, resulting in more comfortable temperatures. The monthly daily average temperature in January is 60.6 °F (15.9 °C). Temperatures dip below the freezing mark on an average of only 1.6 nights per year and the lowest recorded temperature is 18 °F (−8 °C), set on December 28, 1894. The annual mean minimum is just above 30 °F (−1 °C) putting Orlando in hardiness zone 10a. There have been some instances of snow accumulation over the years (despite it being rare), such as in January 1977 (which had also reached Miami), along with flurries that were observed in 1989, 2006, and in 2010.

The average annual rainfall in Orlando is 51.45 inches (1,307 mm), a majority of which occurs in the period from June to September. October through May are Orlando's dry season. During this period (especially in its later months), often a wildfire hazard exists. During some years, fires have been severe. In 1998, a strong El Niño caused an unusually wet January and February, followed by drought throughout the spring and early summer, causing a record wildfire season that created numerous air-quality alerts in Orlando and severely affected normal daily life, including the postponement of that year's Pepsi 400 NASCAR race in nearby Daytona Beach.

Like much of Florida, while hurricanes are a risk, the Orlando metro region's inland location gives the region more protection from storms, than compared to southern and coastal regions of the state. The city is located 42 miles (68 km) inland from the Atlantic and 77 miles (124 km) inland from the Gulf of Mexico. (Note: Distance measured from Orlando City Hall to nearest Atlantic coastline, near Oak Hill, Brevard County, and nearest Gulf coastline, near, Pine Island, Hernando County, using Google Earth's Ruler tool.) Despite its location, the city does see strong hurricanes, as was seen in the 2004 hurricane season, when the Orlando metro region was hit by three hurricanes that year (Hurricane Charley the worst of the three).

Climate data for Orlando (Orlando International Airport), Florida (1991–2020 normals, extremes 1892–present)
| Month | Jan | Feb | Mar | Apr | May | Jun | Jul | Aug | Sep | Oct | Nov | Dec | Year |
|---|---|---|---|---|---|---|---|---|---|---|---|---|---|
| Record high °F (°C) | 88 (31) | 90 (32) | 97 (36) | 99 (37) | 102 (39) | 101 (38) | 101 (38) | 101 (38) | 103 (39) | 98 (37) | 93 (34) | 91 (33) | 103 (39) |
| Mean maximum °F (°C) | 83.5 (28.6) | 85.5 (29.7) | 88.4 (31.3) | 91.1 (32.8) | 94.5 (34.7) | 96.1 (35.6) | 96.1 (35.6) | 95.4 (35.2) | 93.8 (34.3) | 91.0 (32.8) | 86.7 (30.4) | 83.7 (28.7) | 97.2 (36.2) |
| Mean daily maximum °F (°C) | 71.8 (22.1) | 74.9 (23.8) | 78.9 (26.1) | 83.6 (28.7) | 88.4 (31.3) | 90.8 (32.7) | 92.0 (33.3) | 91.6 (33.1) | 89.6 (32.0) | 84.7 (29.3) | 78.3 (25.7) | 73.8 (23.2) | 83.2 (28.4) |
| Daily mean °F (°C) | 60.6 (15.9) | 63.6 (17.6) | 67.3 (19.6) | 72.2 (22.3) | 77.3 (25.2) | 81.2 (27.3) | 82.6 (28.1) | 82.6 (28.1) | 81.0 (27.2) | 75.5 (24.2) | 68.2 (20.1) | 63.3 (17.4) | 73.0 (22.7) |
| Mean daily minimum °F (°C) | 49.5 (9.7) | 52.4 (11.3) | 55.8 (13.2) | 60.7 (15.9) | 66.3 (19.1) | 71.6 (22.0) | 73.2 (22.9) | 73.7 (23.2) | 72.4 (22.4) | 66.2 (19.0) | 58.2 (14.6) | 52.9 (11.6) | 62.7 (17.1) |
| Mean minimum °F (°C) | 33.2 (0.7) | 36.5 (2.5) | 41.3 (5.2) | 49.2 (9.6) | 58.2 (14.6) | 67.5 (19.7) | 70.5 (21.4) | 70.7 (21.5) | 67.8 (19.9) | 53.4 (11.9) | 44.4 (6.9) | 37.6 (3.1) | 31.3 (−0.4) |
| Record low °F (°C) | 19 (−7) | 19 (−7) | 25 (−4) | 37 (3) | 47 (8) | 53 (12) | 64 (18) | 63 (17) | 50 (10) | 38 (3) | 28 (−2) | 18 (−8) | 18 (−8) |
| Average precipitation inches (mm) | 2.48 (63) | 2.04 (52) | 3.03 (77) | 2.58 (66) | 4.02 (102) | 8.05 (204) | 7.46 (189) | 7.69 (195) | 6.37 (162) | 3.46 (88) | 1.79 (45) | 2.48 (63) | 51.45 (1,307) |
| Average precipitation days (≥ 0.01 in) | 7.0 | 6.4 | 6.8 | 6.3 | 8.4 | 16.2 | 17.1 | 17.2 | 14.2 | 8.4 | 6.0 | 7.1 | 121.1 |
Source: NOAA

Climate data for Kissimmee, Florida, 1991–2020 normals, extremes 1959–present
| Month | Jan | Feb | Mar | Apr | May | Jun | Jul | Aug | Sep | Oct | Nov | Dec | Year |
|---|---|---|---|---|---|---|---|---|---|---|---|---|---|
| Record high °F (°C) | 90 (32) | 90 (32) | 92 (33) | 97 (36) | 100 (38) | 101 (38) | 101 (38) | 103 (39) | 98 (37) | 97 (36) | 92 (33) | 90 (32) | 103 (39) |
| Mean maximum °F (°C) | 82.9 (28.3) | 84.9 (29.4) | 87.4 (30.8) | 90.3 (32.4) | 93.9 (34.4) | 95.5 (35.3) | 95.5 (35.3) | 95.3 (35.2) | 94.0 (34.4) | 91.2 (32.9) | 86.7 (30.4) | 83.6 (28.7) | 96.6 (35.9) |
| Mean daily maximum °F (°C) | 71.8 (22.1) | 74.4 (23.6) | 77.9 (25.5) | 83.0 (28.3) | 87.4 (30.8) | 90.0 (32.2) | 91.5 (33.1) | 91.4 (33.0) | 89.5 (31.9) | 84.6 (29.2) | 78.6 (25.9) | 73.5 (23.1) | 82.8 (28.2) |
| Daily mean °F (°C) | 60.1 (15.6) | 62.6 (17.0) | 66.1 (18.9) | 71.4 (21.9) | 76.6 (24.8) | 80.9 (27.2) | 82.5 (28.1) | 82.7 (28.2) | 81.1 (27.3) | 75.4 (24.1) | 67.9 (19.9) | 62.5 (16.9) | 72.5 (22.5) |
| Mean daily minimum °F (°C) | 48.3 (9.1) | 50.7 (10.4) | 54.4 (12.4) | 59.7 (15.4) | 65.8 (18.8) | 71.8 (22.1) | 73.5 (23.1) | 74.1 (23.4) | 72.8 (22.7) | 66.2 (19.0) | 57.3 (14.1) | 51.5 (10.8) | 62.2 (16.8) |
| Mean minimum °F (°C) | 32.7 (0.4) | 35.4 (1.9) | 40.0 (4.4) | 46.9 (8.3) | 55.8 (13.2) | 66.8 (19.3) | 69.9 (21.1) | 70.6 (21.4) | 67.0 (19.4) | 52.4 (11.3) | 42.9 (6.1) | 36.7 (2.6) | 30.6 (−0.8) |
| Record low °F (°C) | 19 (−7) | 27 (−3) | 25 (−4) | 38 (3) | 41 (5) | 53 (12) | 58 (14) | 60 (16) | 56 (13) | 40 (4) | 29 (−2) | 20 (−7) | 19 (−7) |
| Average precipitation inches (mm) | 2.67 (68) | 2.37 (60) | 3.07 (78) | 2.43 (62) | 4.17 (106) | 9.18 (233) | 7.21 (183) | 8.38 (213) | 5.88 (149) | 3.07 (78) | 1.99 (51) | 2.15 (55) | 52.57 (1,335) |
| Average precipitation days (≥ 0.01 in) | 7.6 | 6.5 | 6.2 | 5.7 | 7.8 | 15.8 | 16.7 | 17.7 | 14.3 | 8.7 | 5.8 | 6.5 | 119.3 |
Source: NOAA

Climate data for Sanford, Florida (Orlando Sanford International Airport), 1991–2020 normals, extremes 1948–present
| Month | Jan | Feb | Mar | Apr | May | Jun | Jul | Aug | Sep | Oct | Nov | Dec | Year |
|---|---|---|---|---|---|---|---|---|---|---|---|---|---|
| Record high °F (°C) | 89 (32) | 89 (32) | 94 (34) | 97 (36) | 100 (38) | 102 (39) | 103 (39) | 100 (38) | 97 (36) | 95 (35) | 92 (33) | 89 (32) | 103 (39) |
| Mean maximum °F (°C) | 83.2 (28.4) | 85.3 (29.6) | 88.3 (31.3) | 91.4 (33.0) | 95.3 (35.2) | 96.8 (36.0) | 96.8 (36.0) | 96.7 (35.9) | 94.4 (34.7) | 91.0 (32.8) | 87.1 (30.6) | 83.9 (28.8) | 98.2 (36.8) |
| Mean daily maximum °F (°C) | 71.3 (21.8) | 74.2 (23.4) | 78.3 (25.7) | 83.4 (28.6) | 88.5 (31.4) | 91.0 (32.8) | 92.7 (33.7) | 92.5 (33.6) | 89.7 (32.1) | 84.6 (29.2) | 78.2 (25.7) | 73.4 (23.0) | 83.1 (28.4) |
| Daily mean °F (°C) | 60.4 (15.8) | 63.1 (17.3) | 67.1 (19.5) | 72.3 (22.4) | 77.7 (25.4) | 81.9 (27.7) | 83.6 (28.7) | 83.6 (28.7) | 81.4 (27.4) | 75.5 (24.2) | 68.2 (20.1) | 63.1 (17.3) | 73.2 (22.9) |
| Mean daily minimum °F (°C) | 49.6 (9.8) | 52.1 (11.2) | 55.9 (13.3) | 61.2 (16.2) | 67.0 (19.4) | 72.7 (22.6) | 74.4 (23.6) | 74.6 (23.7) | 73.1 (22.8) | 66.5 (19.2) | 58.2 (14.6) | 52.7 (11.5) | 63.2 (17.3) |
| Mean minimum °F (°C) | 32.4 (0.2) | 35.6 (2.0) | 40.2 (4.6) | 47.6 (8.7) | 56.6 (13.7) | 66.7 (19.3) | 70.1 (21.2) | 70.5 (21.4) | 67.2 (19.6) | 52.8 (11.6) | 43.4 (6.3) | 36.4 (2.4) | 30.2 (−1.0) |
| Record low °F (°C) | 19 (−7) | 25 (−4) | 27 (−3) | 36 (2) | 45 (7) | 52 (11) | 60 (16) | 64 (18) | 52 (11) | 39 (4) | 27 (−3) | 19 (−7) | 19 (−7) |
| Average precipitation inches (mm) | 2.36 (60) | 2.25 (57) | 2.85 (72) | 2.35 (60) | 3.31 (84) | 8.19 (208) | 7.29 (185) | 6.77 (172) | 6.24 (158) | 3.90 (99) | 1.88 (48) | 2.24 (57) | 49.63 (1,261) |
| Average precipitation days (≥ 0.01 in) | 8.1 | 8.0 | 7.9 | 7.1 | 8.3 | 17.0 | 16.7 | 17.2 | 15.7 | 9.9 | 8.4 | 8.3 | 132.6 |
Source: NOAA

== Component counties, subregions, and cities ==
=== Counties ===
| County | 2025 Estimate | 2020 Census | Change | Area | Density |
|---|---|---|---|---|---|
| Orange County | 1,528,002 | 1,429,908 | +6.86% | 903.43 sq mi (2,339.9 km^{2}) | 1,691/sq mi (653/km^{2}) |
| Seminole County | 491,884 | 470,856 | +4.47% | 309.22 sq mi (800.9 km^{2}) | 1,591/sq mi (614/km^{2}) |
| Osceola County | 481,718 | 388,656 | +23.94% | 1,327.45 sq mi (3,438.1 km^{2}) | 363/sq mi (140/km^{2}) |
| Lake County | 456,068 | 383,956 | +18.78% | 938.38 sq mi (2,430.4 km^{2}) | 486/sq mi (188/km^{2}) |
| Total | 2,957,672 | 2,673,376 | +10.63% | 3,478.48 sq mi (9,009.2 km^{2}) | 850/sq mi (328/km^{2}) |

=== Largest cities ===
The following is a list of the fifteen largest cities in the Orlando metropolitan area as ranked by population.

| City | County | 2010 population | 2020 population | 2010 to 2020 % change |
|---|---|---|---|---|
| Orlando | Orange | 238,300 | 307,573 | +29.07% |
| Deltona | Volusia | 85,192 | 93,692 | +9.98% |
| Kissimmee | Osceola | 59,682 | 79,286 | +32.85% |
| Poinciana | Osceola and Polk | 53,193 | 69,309 | +30.30% |
| Pine Hills | Orange | 60,076 | 66,111 | +10.05% |
| Sanford | Seminole | 53,570 | 61,051 | +13.96% |
| Saint Cloud | Osceola | 35,183 | 58,964 | +67.59% |
| Horizon West | Orange | 14,000 | 58,101 | +315.01% |
| Four Corners | Lake, Polk, Osceola, Orange | 26,116 | 56,381 | +115.89% |
| Apopka | Orange | 41,542 | 54,873 | +32.09% |
| Ocoee | Orange | 35,579 | 47,295 | +32.93% |
| Winter Garden | Orange | 34,568 | 46,964 | +35.86% |
| Ormond Beach | Volusia | 38,137 | 43,080 | +12.96% |
| Winter Springs | Seminole | 33,282 | 38,342 | +15.20% |
| DeLand | Volusia | 27,031 | 37,351 | +38.18% |

=== Principal cities ===
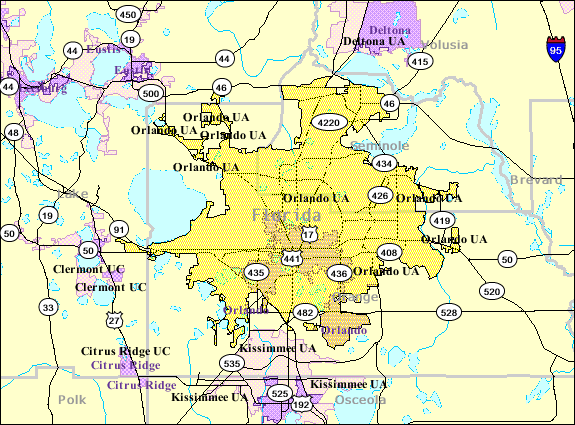
Greater Orlando urban area

Historical populations for Orange County
| Census | Pop. | Note | %± |
|---|---|---|---|
| 1900 | 11,374 | | — |
| 1910 | 19,107 | | 68.0% |
| 1920 | 19,890 | | 4.1% |
| 1930 | 49,737 | | 150.1% |
| 1940 | 70,074 | | 40.9% |
| 1950 | 114,950 | | 64.0% |
| 1960 | 263,540 | | 129.3% |
| 1970 | 344,311 | | 30.6% |
| 1980 | 471,016 | | 36.8% |
| 1990 | 677,491 | | 43.8% |
| 2000 | 896,344 | | 32.3% |
| 2010 | 1,145,965 | | 27.8% |
| 2020 | 1,429,908 | | 24.8% |
U.S. Decennial Census; 1900–1990; 1990–2000

Principal cities (sometimes called primary cities) are defined by the OMB based on population size and employment. In general, a principal city has more non-residents commuting into the city to work than residents commuting out of the city to work.

- Orlando, pop. 307,573
- Kissimmee, pop. 79,226
- Sanford, pop. 53,570

=== Suburbs with more than 10,000 inhabitants ===
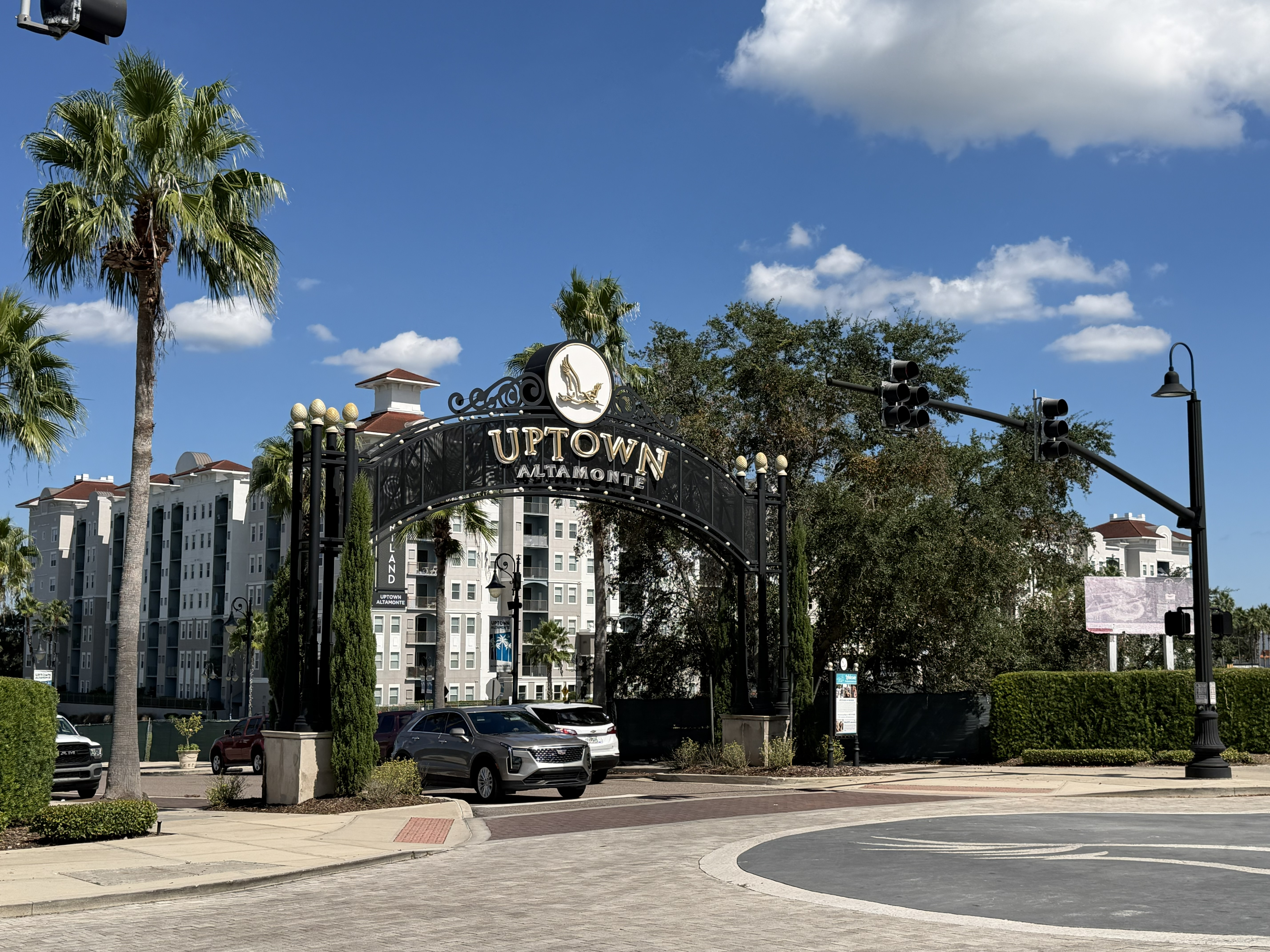
Uptown at Altamonte Springs, Seminole County

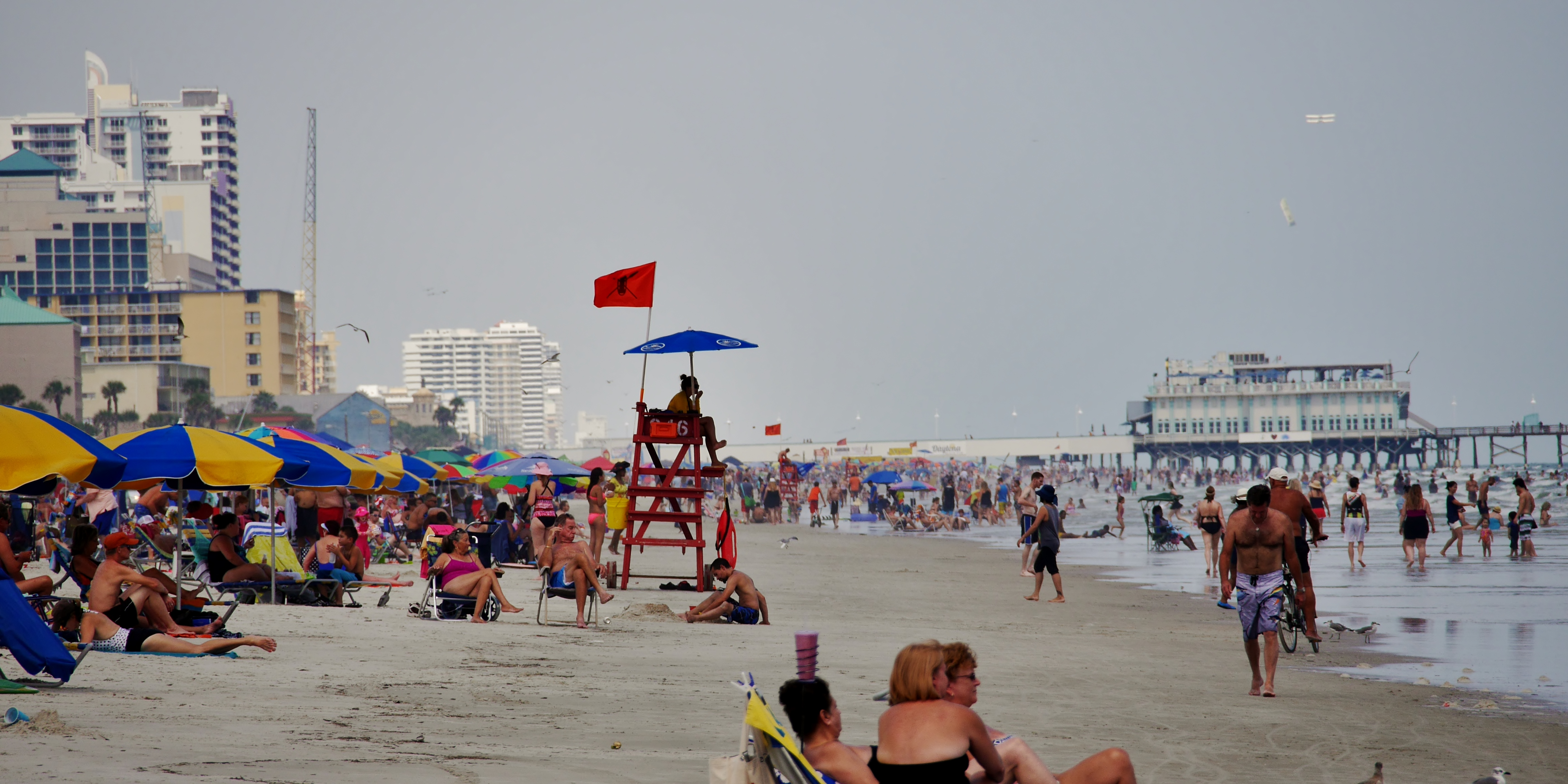
Daytona Beach, Volusia County

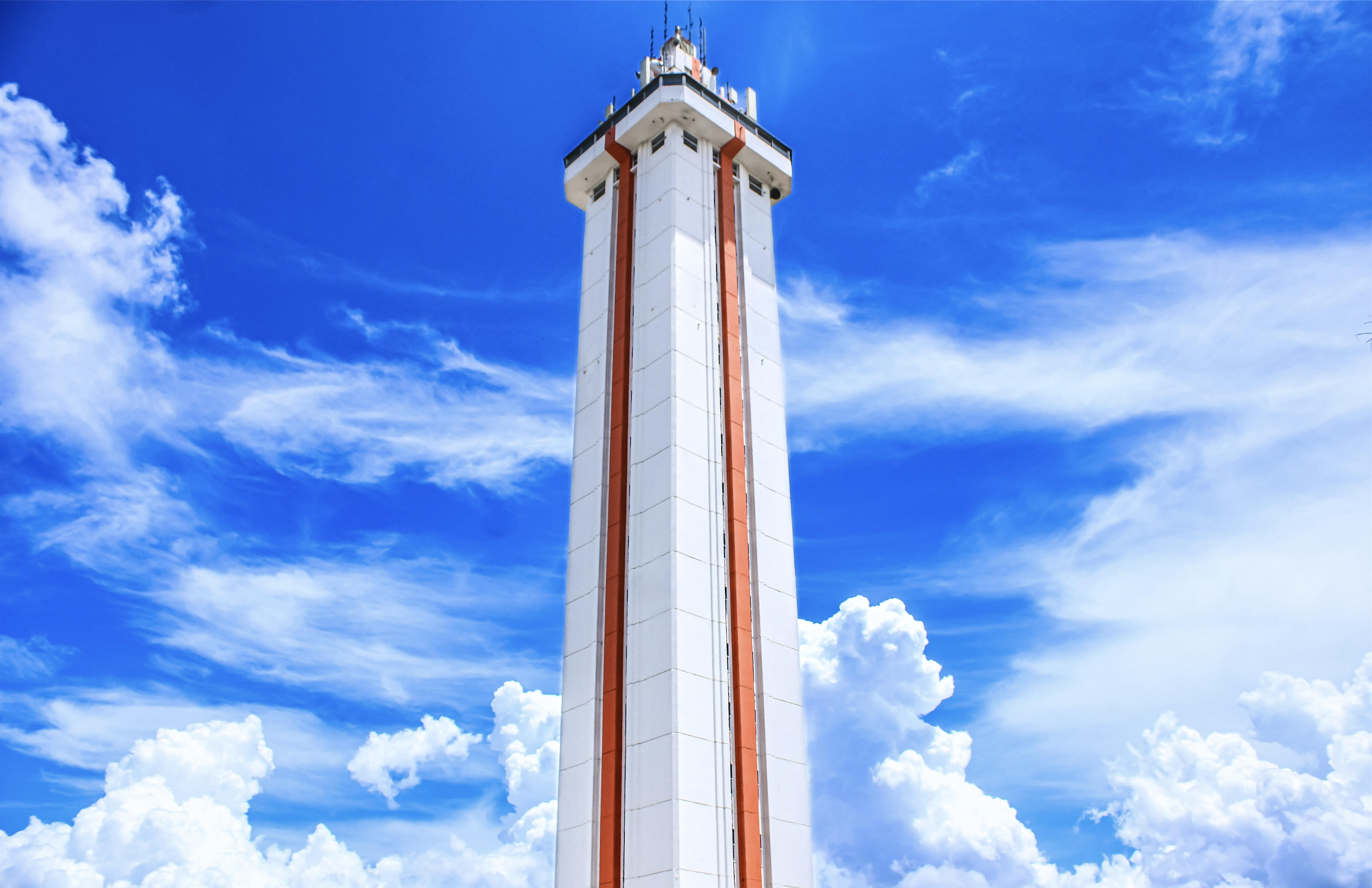
Florida Citrus Tower in Clermont, Lake County

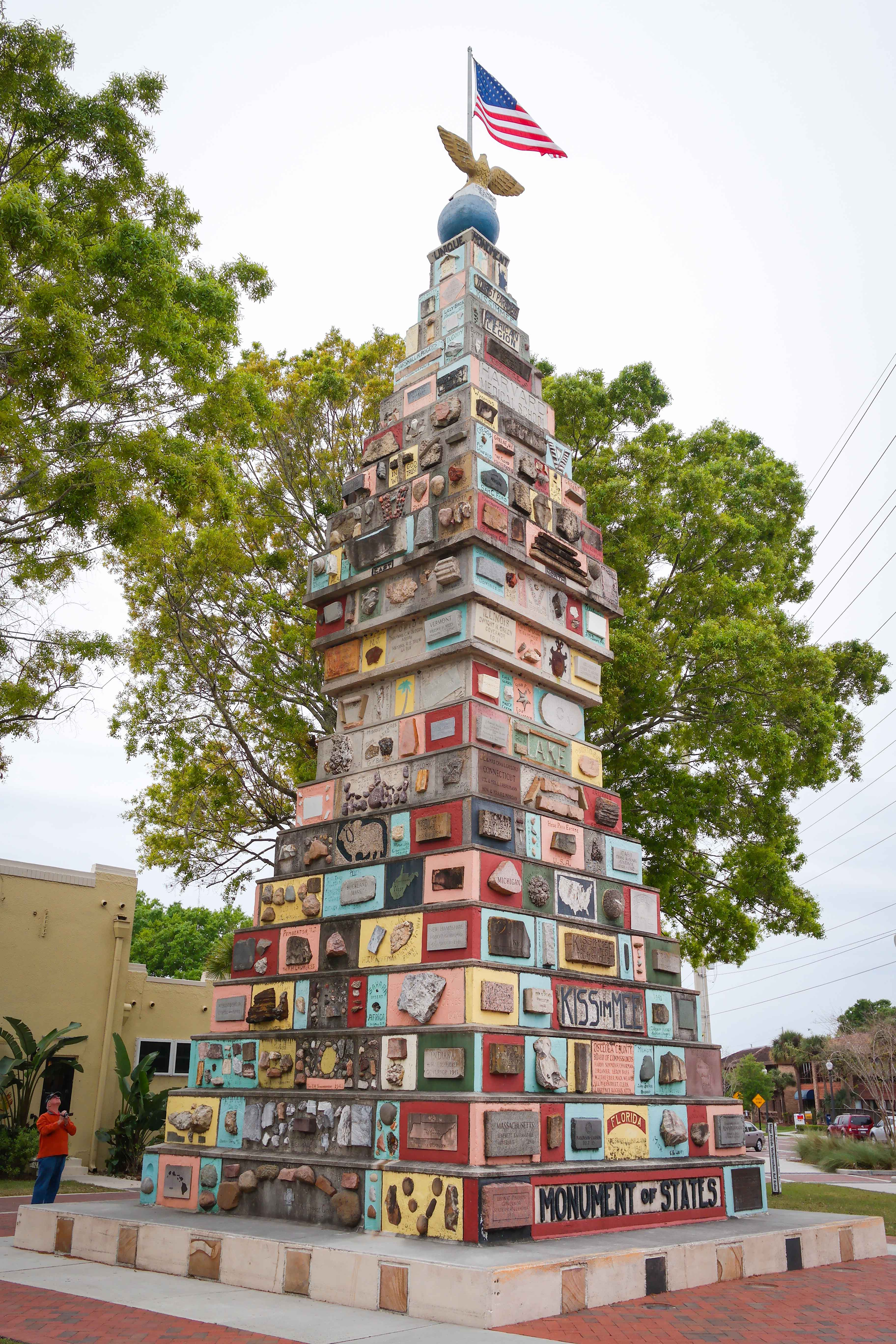
Monument of States in Kissimmee, Osceola County

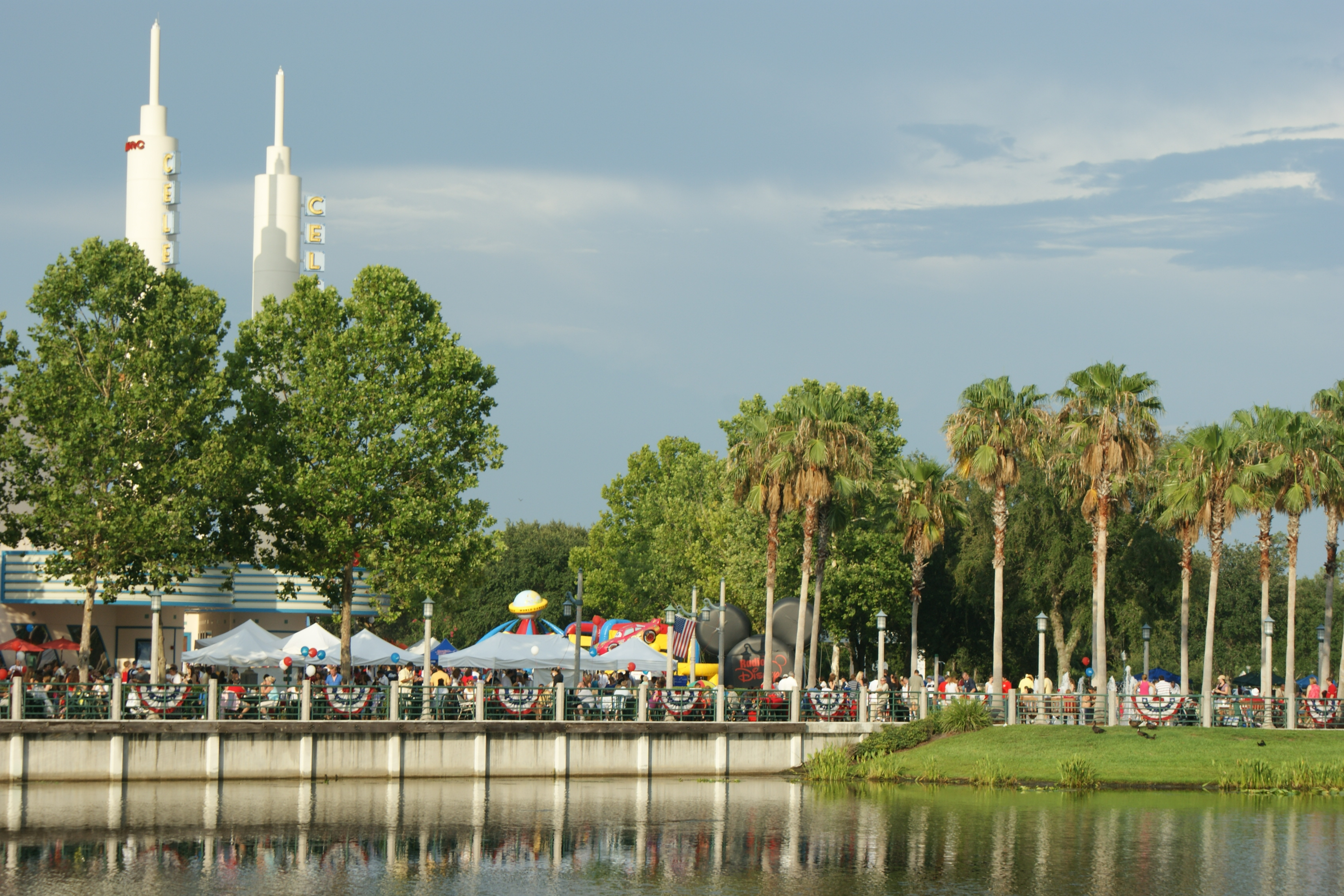
Celebration, Osceola County

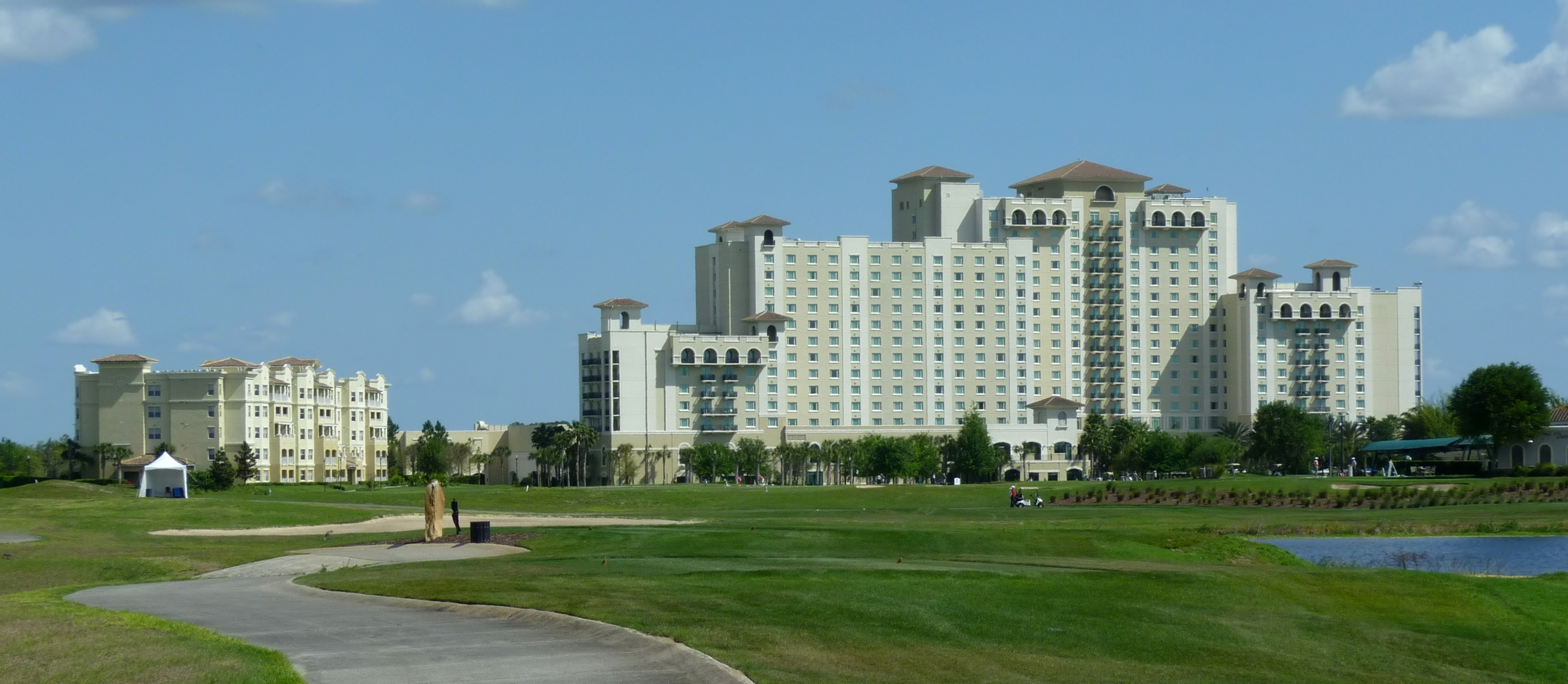
Omni Orlando Resort at ChampionsGate, Osceola and Polk Counties

- Alafaya
- Altamonte Springs
- Apopka
- Azalea Park
- Buenaventura Lakes
- Casselberry
- Clermont
- Celebration
- Conway
- Daytona Beach
- DeBary
- Doctor Phillips
- Eustis
- Fairview Shores
- Forest City
- Goldenrod
- Hunter's Creek
- Lake Butler
- Lake Mary
- Lockhart
- Longwood
- Maitland
- Meadow Woods
- Mount Dora
- Oak Ridge
- Oviedo
- Pine Castle
- Southchase
- Tavares
- University
- Wekiwa Springs
- Winter Park

=== Suburbs with fewer than 10,000 inhabitants ===
- Bay Lake
- Bay Hill
- Bithlo
- Belle Isle
- Campbell
- Chuluota
- Eatonville
- Edgewood
- Ferndale
- Fern Park
- Geneva
- Gotha
- Groveland
- Heathrow
- Holden Heights
- Lake Buena Vista
- Lake Hart
- Midway
- Minneola
- Montverde
- Mount Plymouth
- Oakland
- Okahumpka
- Orlo Vista
- Paradise Heights
- Sky Lake
- Sorrento
- South Apopka
- Taft
- Tangelo Park
- Tangerine
- Tildenville
- Union Park
- Vineland
- Wedgefield
- Williamsburg
- Windermere
- Zellwood

== Demographics ==
Orlando MSA (Lake, Orange, Osceola, and Seminole)
| Census | Pop. | Note | %± |
|---|---|---|---|
| 1980 | 804,925 | | — |
| 1990 | 1,224,852 | | 52.2% |
| 2000 | 1,644,561 | | 34.3% |
| 2010 | 2,134,411 | | 29.8% |
| 2020 | 2,673,376 | | 25.3% |
| 2025 (est.) | 2,957,672 | | 10.6% |
U.S. Decennial Census; 2000 2010 2020 2025

| Historical racial composition | 2020 | 2010 | 2000 |
|---|---|---|---|
| White (non-Hispanic) | 43.4% | 53.3% | 65.1% |
| Hispanic or Latino | 32.0% | 25.2% | 16.5% |
| Black or African American (non-Hispanic) | 14.5% | 14.9% | 13.3% |
| Asian and Pacific Islander (non-Hispanic) | 4.5% | 3.9% | 2.6% |
| Native American (non-Hispanic) | 0.2% | 0.2% | 0.3% |
| Other Race (non-Hispanic) | 0.9% | 0.5% | 0.3% |
| Two or more races (non-Hispanic) | 4.2% | 2.0% | 1.8% |
| Population | 2,673,376 | 2,134,411 | 1,644,561 |

| Demographic characteristics | 2020 |
|---|---|
| Households | 1,087,949 |
| Ages 0–17 | 21.5% |
| Ages 18–64 | 62.9% |
| Ages 65 + | 15.5% |
| Median age | 40.2 |
| Population | 2,673,376 |

Economic indicators
| 2017–21 American Community Survey | Orlando metro area | Florida |
|---|---|---|
| Median income | $40,457 | $39,920 |
| Median household income | $70,926 | $69,303 |
| Poverty Rate | 11.7% | 12.7% |
| High school diploma | 90.8% | 89.9% |
| Bachelor's degree | 34.5% | 34.3% |
| Advanced degree | 11.8% | 12.9% |

| Language spoken at home (no data for Lake County) (Note: Language spoken at home among residents at least five years old) | 2015 (Note: Refers to 2013–2017 American Community Survey data; the last Decennial Census where language data was collected was in the 2000 census) |
|---|---|
| English | 61.8% |
| Spanish or Spanish Creole | 27.5% |
| French or Haitian Creole | 2.9% |
| Other Languages | 7.8% |

== Politics ==
The Orlando metropolitan area is historically a Republican stronghold but began shifting toward the Democratic Party at the turn of the 21st century, driven by increasing demographic diversity. However, following the 2016 election, the region has shown a trend toward the Republican Party, largely due to growing support among Hispanic voters, particularly Puerto Ricans, under Donald Trump. In the 2024 election, Trump came within one percentage point of winning the metro area, the closest margin since 2004.

Orlando Metropolitan Presidential election results
| Year | Democratic | Republican | Third parties |
|---|---|---|---|
| 2024 | 49.8% 629,911 | 48.6% 614,859 | 1.6% 19,757 |
| 2020 | 54.7% 708,343 | 44.0% 569,977 | 1.3% 16,466 |
| 2016 | 53.5% 584,102 | 41.9% 457,147 | 2.86% 71,300 |
| 2012 | 53.9% 498,366 | 46.1% 426,064 | 0.0% 0 |

== Economy ==
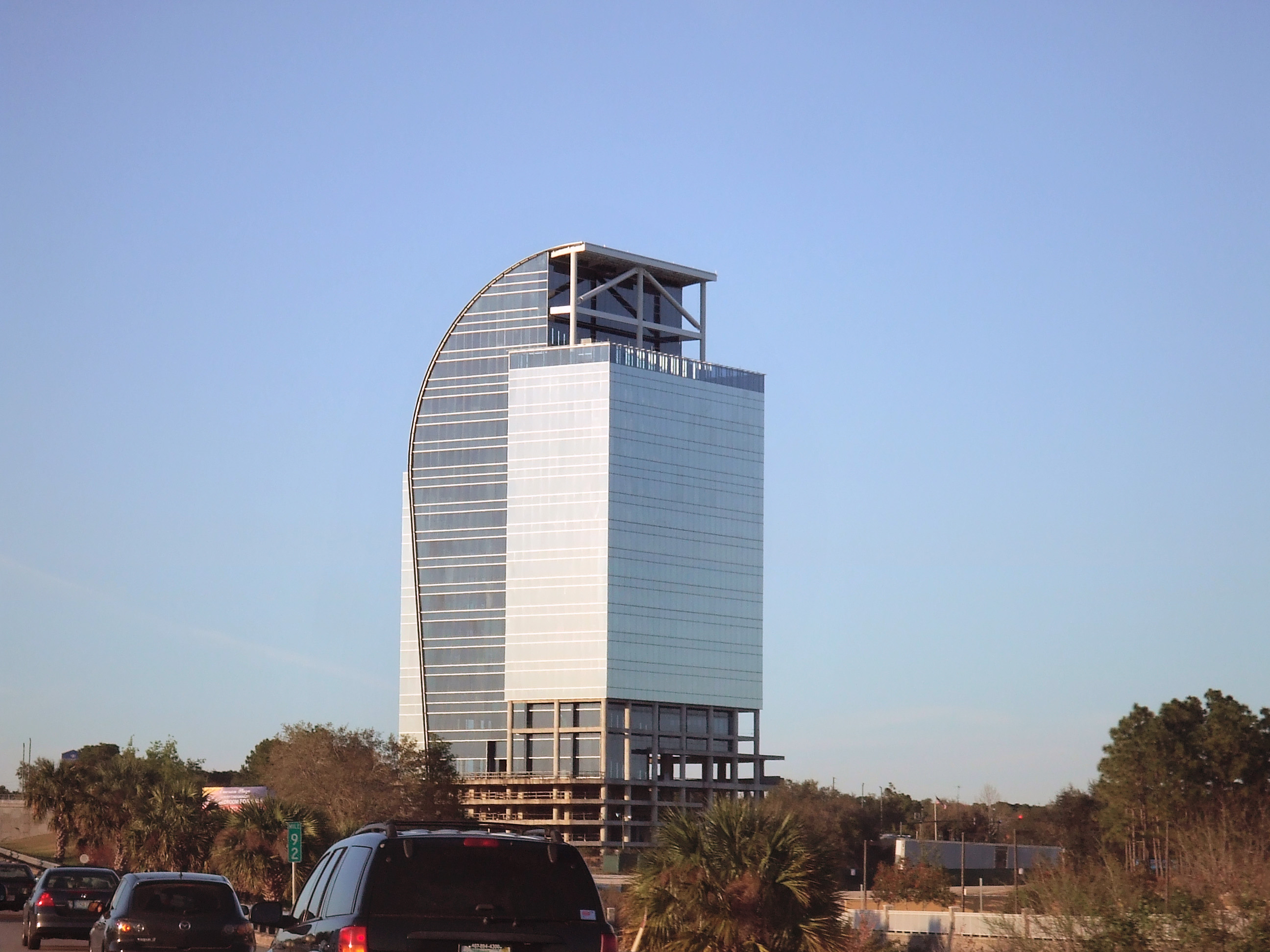
Majesty Building, is an 18-story, 300,000-square-foot (27,871 m^{2}) office building located in Altamonte Springs, Seminole County

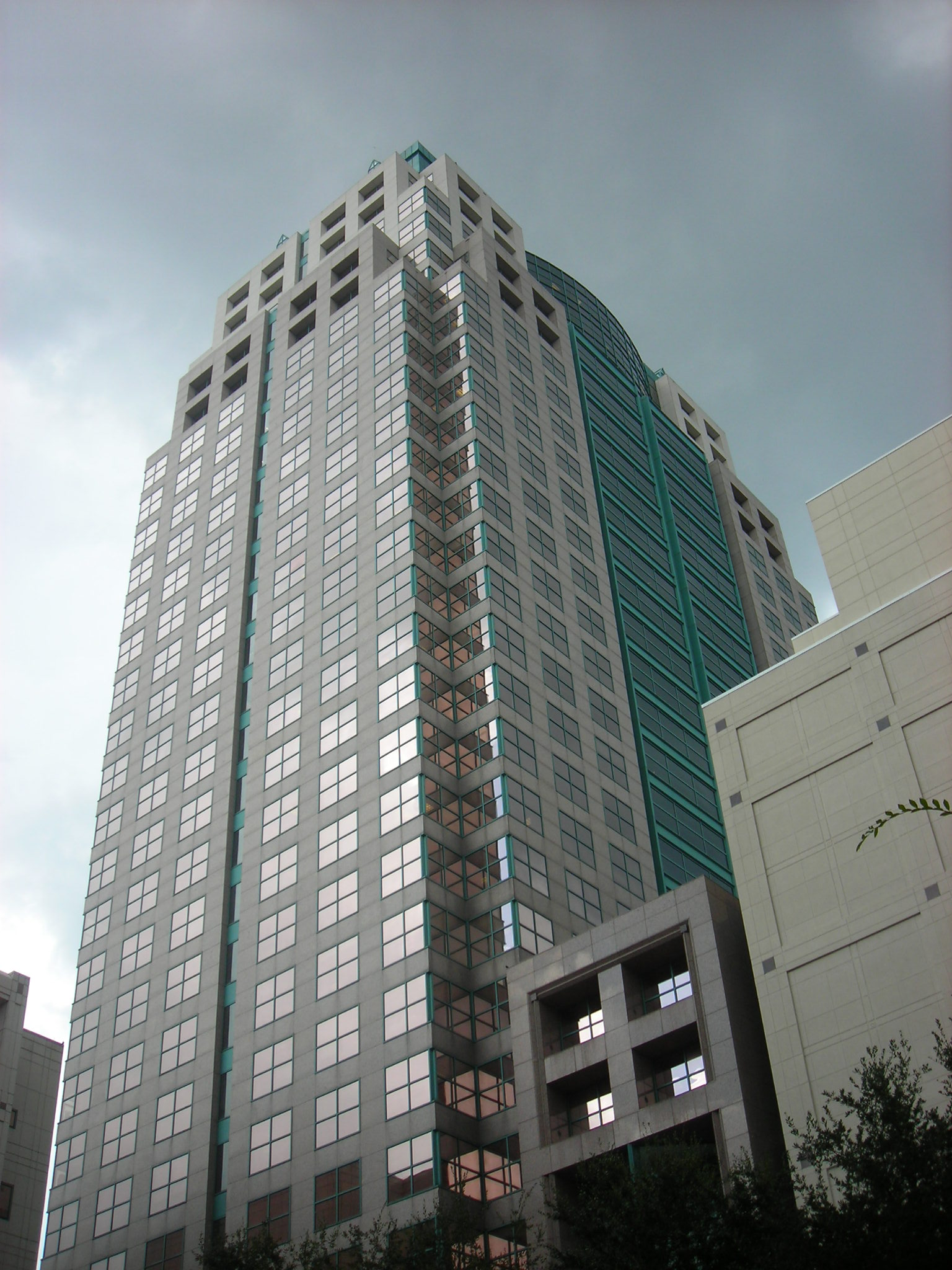
The Sun Trust Center, at a height of 441 ft (134.4 m), is the tallest multi-story skyscraper in Orlando, Orange County

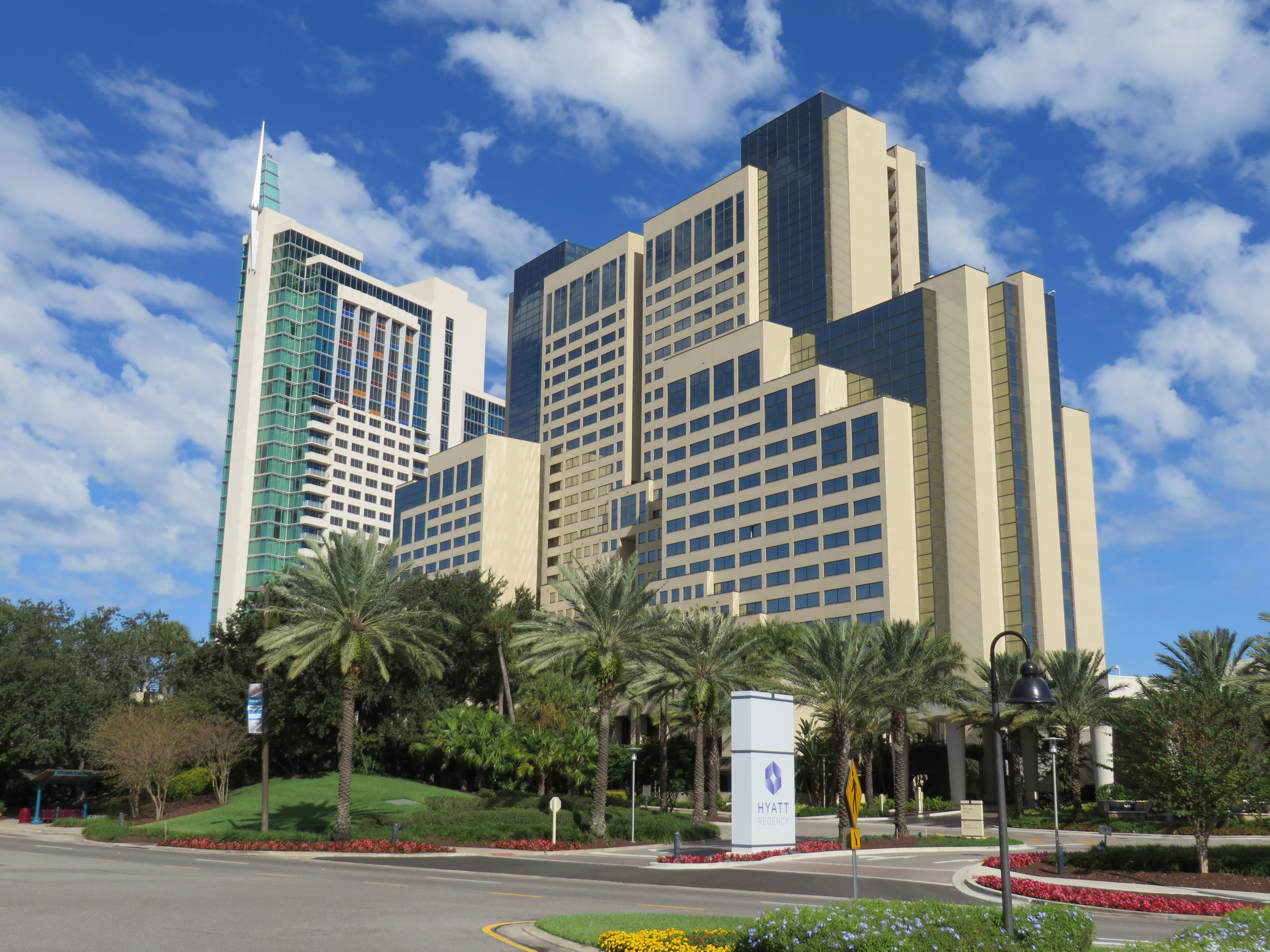
Hyatt Regency Orlando, at a height of 428 ft (130.5 m), is the second tallest multi-story skyscraper in Orlando, Orange County

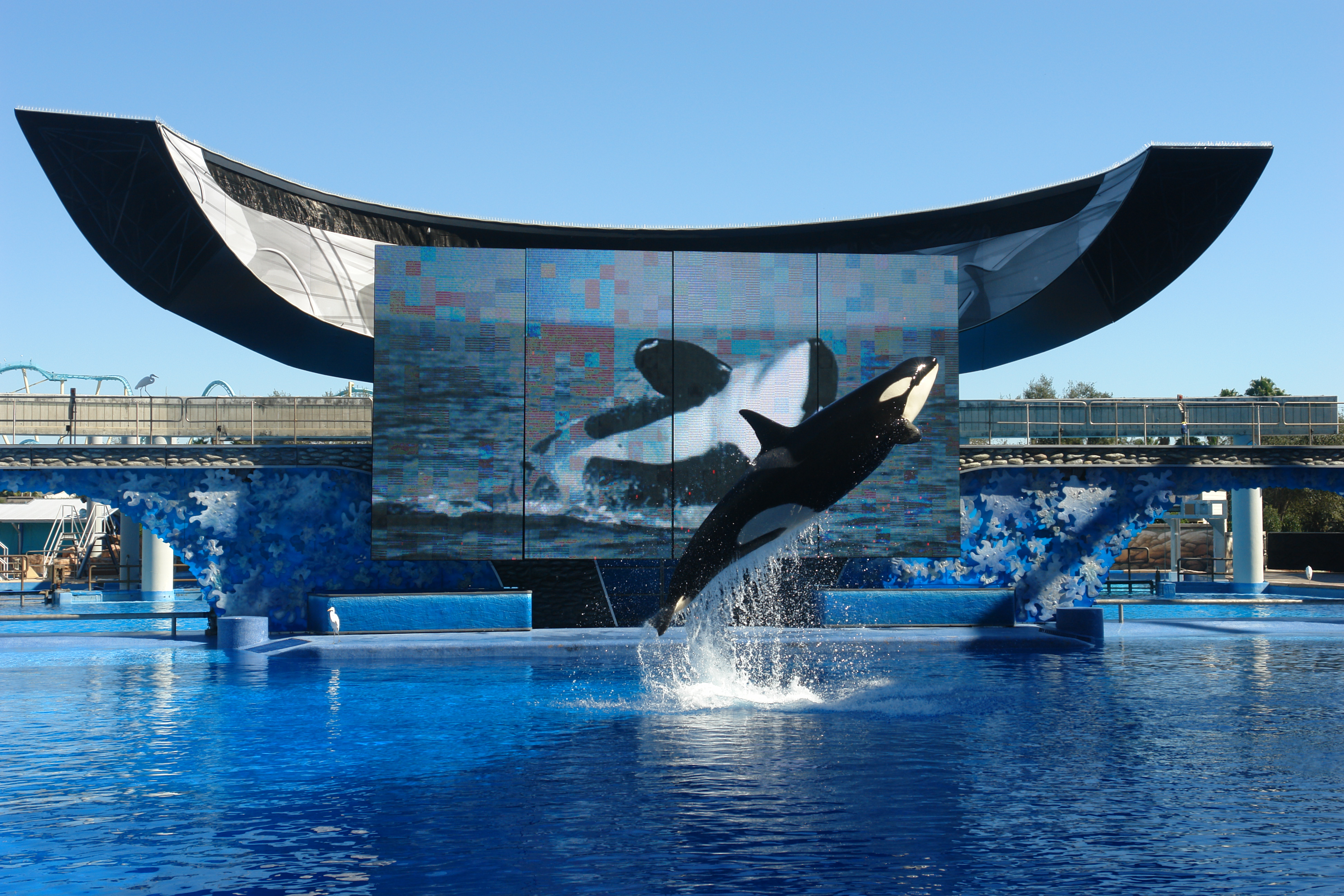
Live Orca performance at SeaWorld Orlando, Orange County

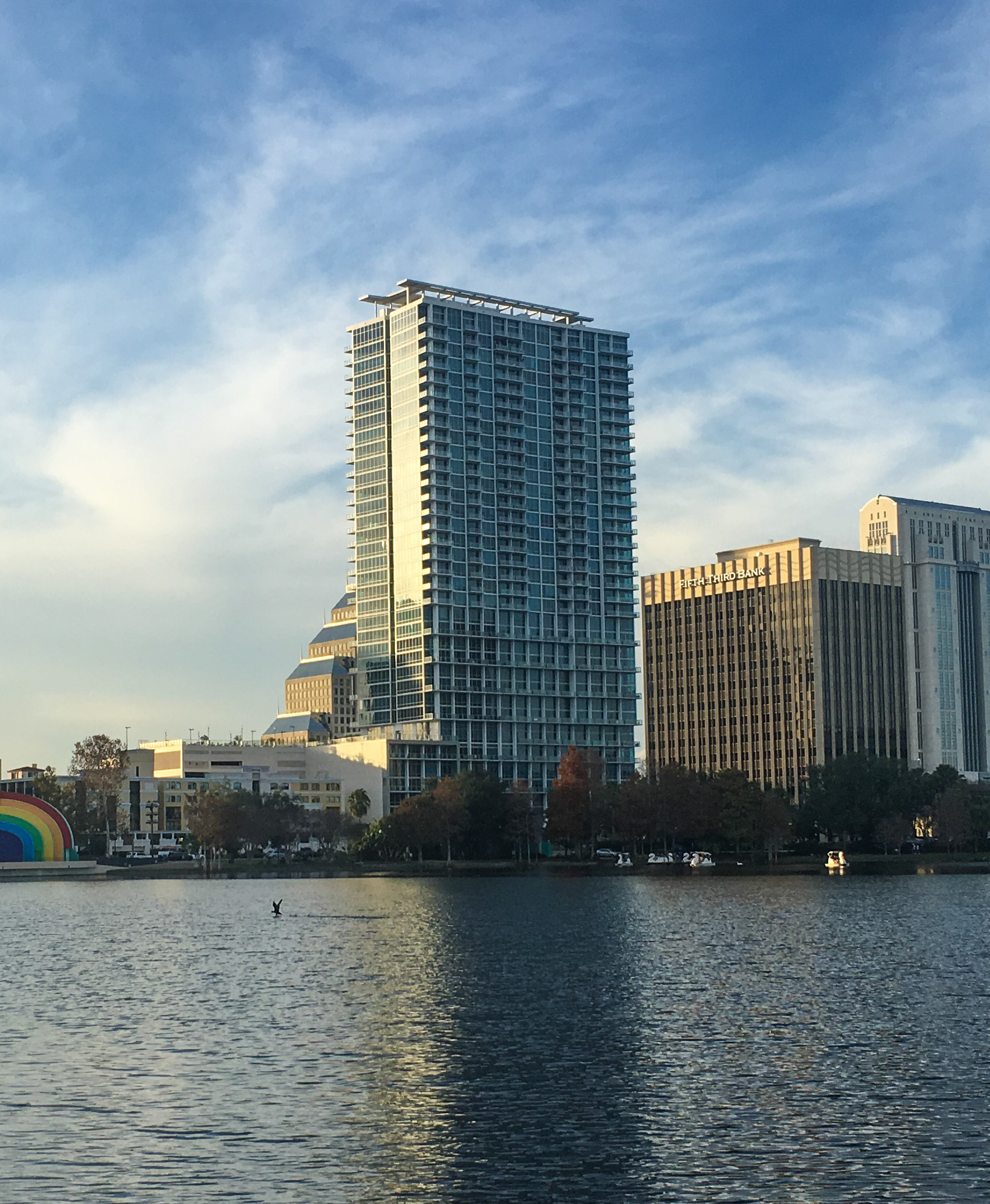
The VUE at Lake Eola at a height of 426 ft (129.8 m), is a residential skyscraper in Downtown Orlando and is the third tallest building in the city.

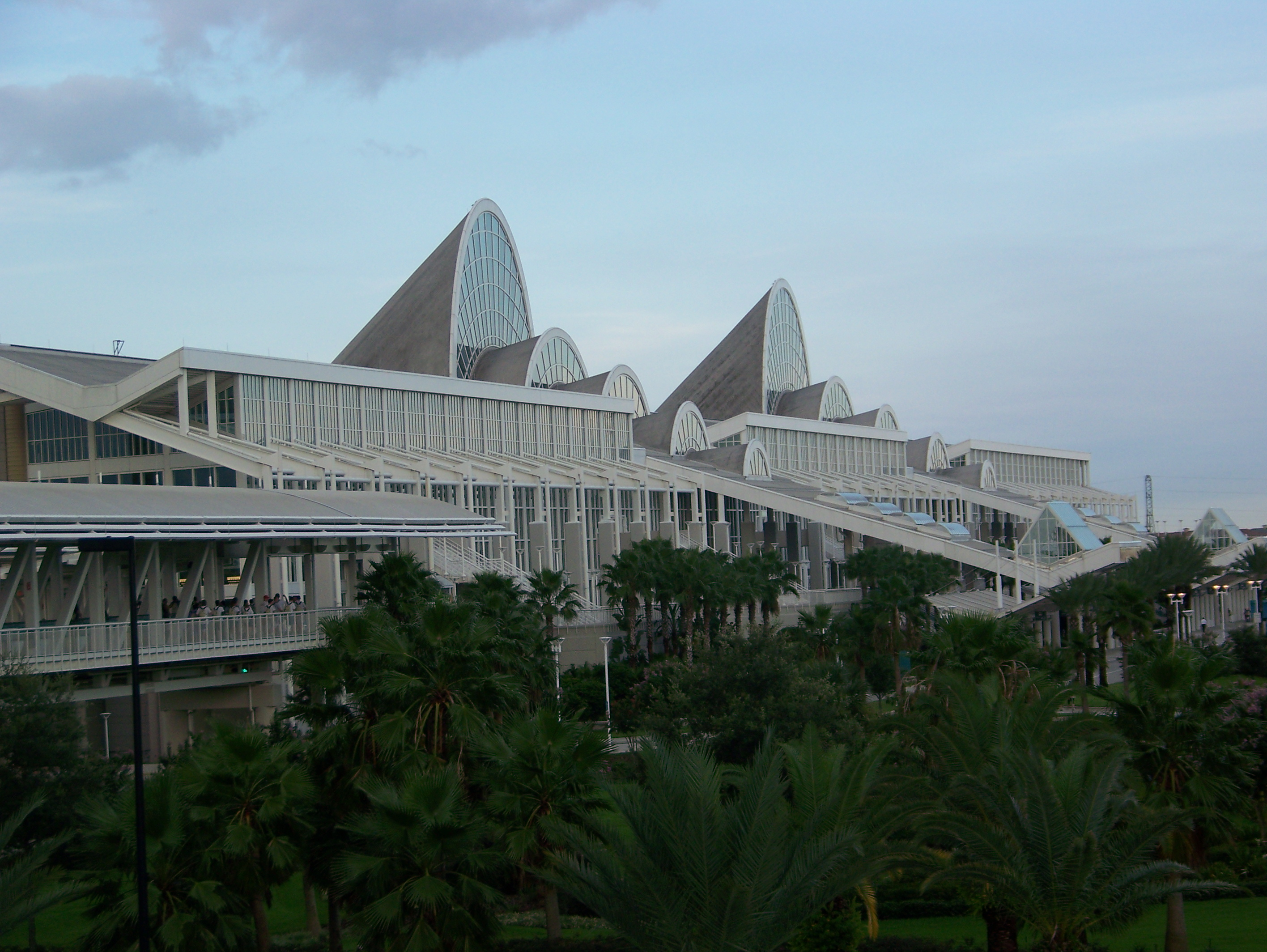
Orange County Convention Center, it is the primary convention center for the metropolitan region and is the second-largest convention center in the United States, after McCormick Place in Chicago

Greater Orlando is one of the most popular tourist destinations in the world thanks to the many theme parks in the area. Famous attractions include Walt Disney World, SeaWorld Orlando and Universal Orlando. Millions of tourists visit these and other attractions every year.

In 2015, the Orlando area attracted 68 million people.

The citrus industry historically dominated the Orlando area economy but has declined over the past 100 years. The Christmas 1989 impact freeze proved particularly damaging to commercial citrus farming within Greater Orlando. There are still three major orange juice plants remaining in the area: Cutrale Citrus Juices in Leesburg; Florida's Natural Growers in Umatilla; and Silver Springs Citrus in Howey-in-the-Hills. Minute Maid maintains a major juice flavoring plant in Apopka.

Other agricultural pursuits, particularly cattle farming, remain important parts of the Central Florida economy but are now all located on the outer fringes of the metro area. Orlando is also a major food processing center.

Metro Orlando has served as a major military defense and aerospace center since World War II. The most prominent defense contractor in the area is Lockheed Martin, which operates both a laboratory and a manufacturing facility in Orlando. Military presence began in the 1940s, with the opening of McCoy Air Force Base and the Orlando Naval Training Center.

McCoy AFB was a major hub of B-52 Stratofortress operations. McCoy AFB was split between the city and NTC Orlando in 1974, and NTC Orlando closed in the mid-1990s. McCoy AFB is now the location of the Orlando International Airport. Farther north in Sanford, the Orlando Sanford International Airport was originally Naval Air Station Sanford.

Metro Orlando's economy has greatly diversified from tourism, and the area is now considered a primary city for the modeling, simulation, and training (MS&T) industry. The University of Central Florida is home to more than 60,000 students, the second largest public university campus by enrollment, and the university established the UCF College of Medicine in 2006. The Central Florida Research Park is the seventh largest research park in the United States by number of employees and fourth largest by number of companies. In addition to a Lockheed Martin branch, it also hosts other major hi-tech companies, such as Oracle Corporation, Electronic Arts, and Siemens.

Orlando is targeting the biotechnology and life sciences industries, with major new projects clustering in the Lake Nona Medical City. In addition to the UCF College of Medicine, a VA Hospital, a Sanford-Burnham Institute research center and a Nemours Foundation children's hospital are being constructed.

=== Industry ===
Tavistock Group, an investment firm that held 7,000 acres (2,800 ha) of land immediately southeast of Orlando International Airport, began formulating new possibilities for its land use after the decline in tourism to the state. Tavistock decided to use part of the land to establish a bio-sciences cluster.

In 2005, the state of Florida along with Tavistock Group and the University of Central Florida agreed that Tavistock would donate 50 acres (20 ha) and $12.5 million (which the state would match for a total of $25 Million) to start the UCF College of Medicine and the Burnett School of Biomedical Sciences. The UCF College of Medicine won approval from the State Board of Governors in 2006. That decision was key to attracting Sanford-Burnham Medical Research Institute to Central Florida. Tavistock then donated another 50 acres (20 ha) and $17.5 million to Sanford-Burnham which allowed Sanford-Burnham's East Coast expansion.

In February and March 2007 respectively, Nemours and the United States Department of Veterans Affairs announced Lake Nona as the site of two new hospitals. Other prospective tenants of the Lake Nona Medical City included MD Anderson Cancer Center Orlando, the University of Florida research center, and Valencia Community College. It was determined in 2008 from a study done by Arduin, Laffer and Moore Econometrics that the Lake Nona Medical City cluster has in two years reached 80% of the Milken Numbers which were based on the commitments made by the economic development statements. The study then released new projections for the 10-year period which included 30,000 jobs created and a $7.6 billion economic impact.

In January 2020, KPMG completed construction of a $450 million, 55 acre, state-of-the-art training facility in the Lake Nona region of the Greater Orlando area. The site hosts KPMG professionals for training from across the United States, and provides direct shuttles from Orlando International Airport to the training facility. Only the firm's employees are permitted on the grounds.

== Education ==
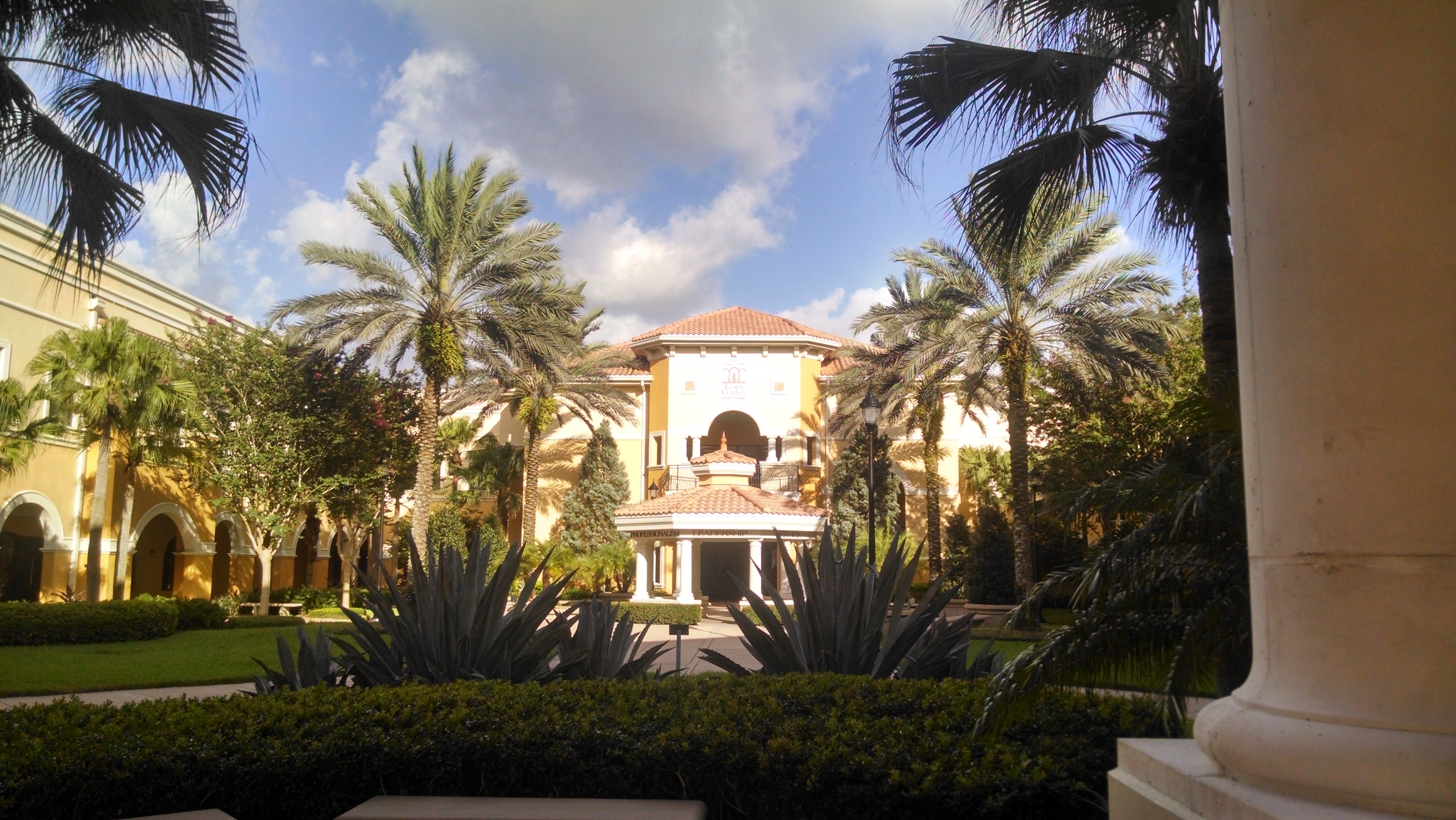
Rosen College of Hospitality Management. Part of the University of Central Florida (UCF) in Orange County. With 70,674 students as of the fall 2025 semester, it has the second-largest on-campus student body of any public university in the United States. UCF is classified among "R1: Doctoral Universities – Very high research spending and doctorate production."

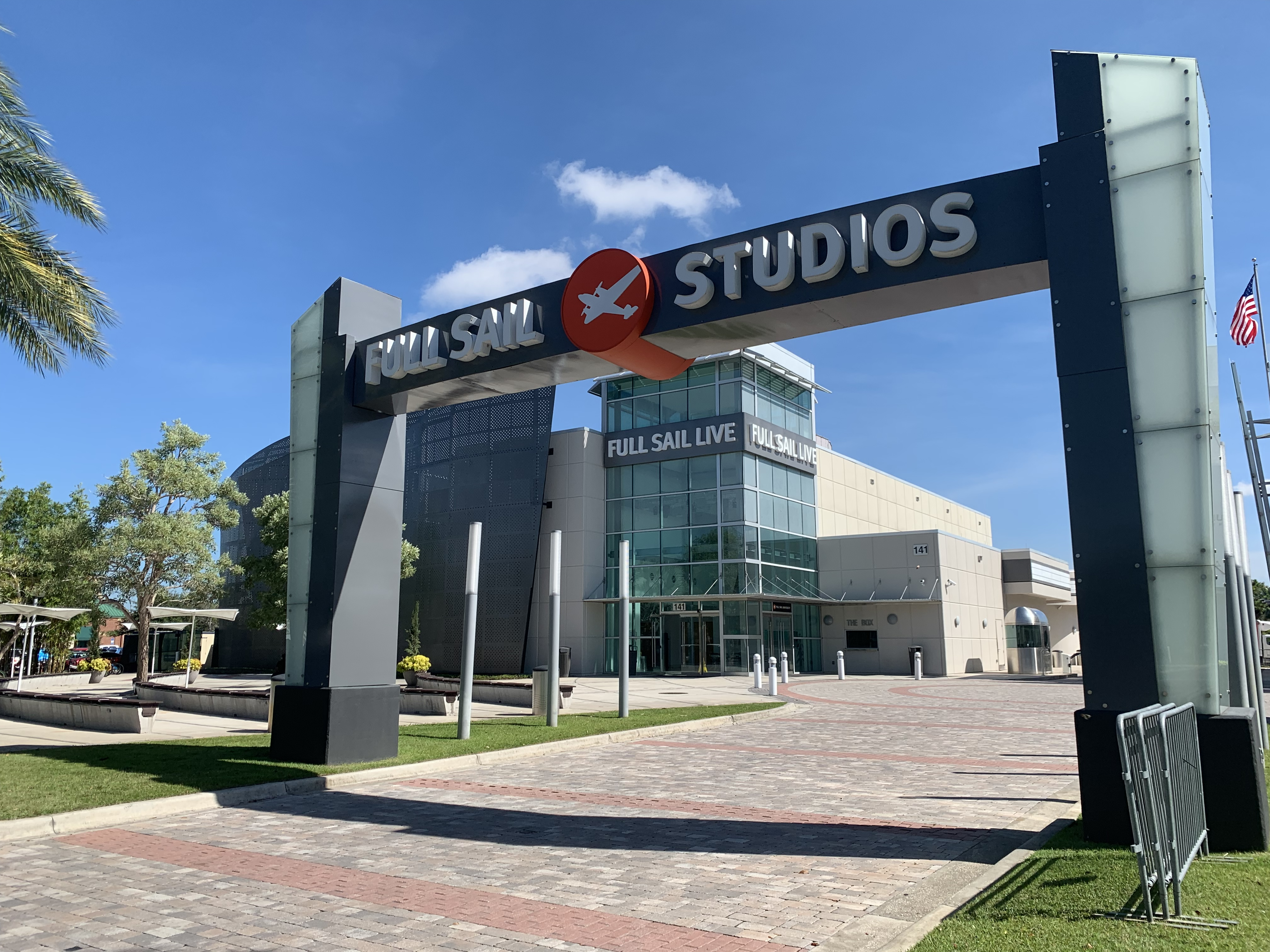
Formerly a recording studio from Ohio, in 1980 Full Sail University opened in Orlando. It is an accredited private university that offers associate, bachelor's, and master's degree programs in sound production, graphic design, computer animation and business administration.

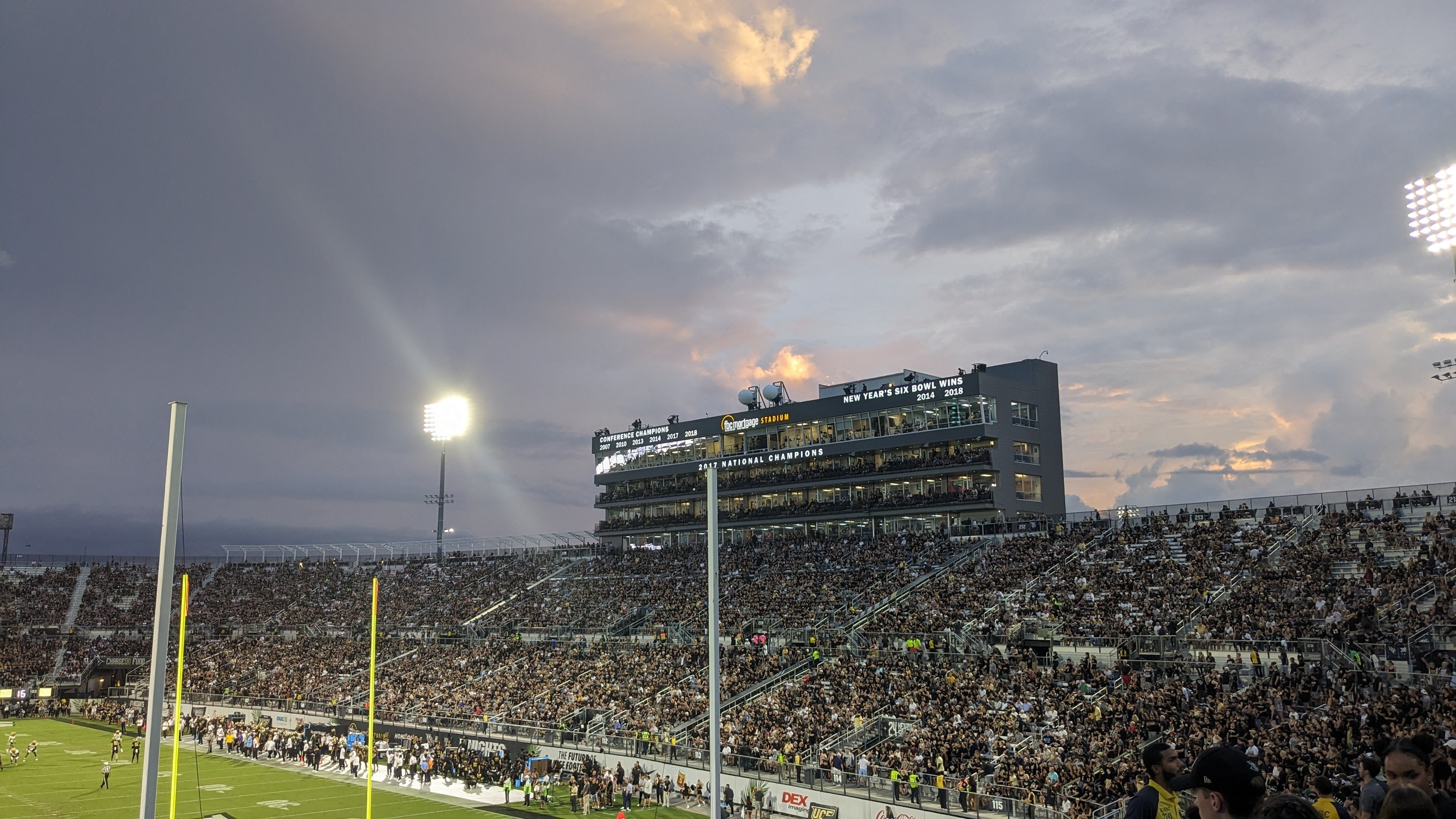
FBC Mortgage Stadium, the home field of the UCF Knights (which is a part of NCAA Division I FBS in college football)

In Florida, each county has a school district coterminous with the county, distinct from the county government. Each school district is headed by an elected school board. Orange County has a school board with seven members elected from single-member districts plus a board chair elected at-large. Osceola County has a school board of five members elected from single-member districts. Lake and Seminole counties have school boards of five members elected by county-wide vote from districts in which they must reside. The school districts in the Greater Orlando metro area each have a professional superintendent who manages the day-to-day operations of the district. The superintendent in each of those districts is appointed by and serves at the pleasure of the school board.

As of 2023, the Orange County Public School District is currently the 8th-largest public school district in the nation.

The University of Central Florida is a nationally recognized 4-year public university in the region. As of the Fall 2020 semester, the university's student population was 71,948, making it the largest university in the nation by enrollment. The university's 1,415 acre main campus is situated in northeast Orange County.

Nearby Winter Park is the home of Rollins College, a private college situated only a few miles from Downtown Orlando. In 2012, it was ranked #1 by U.S. News & World Report amongst regional universities in the South.

The Disney College Program (DCP) is a United States national internship program operated by the Disney Programs division of The Walt Disney Company. The DCP is located at the Walt Disney World Resort in Orlando (another version of the DCP is also featured at Disneyland Resort in Anaheim, California). The program recruits college students (ages 18 and older) of all majors for a semester-long paid work experience program at either the Orlando or Anaheim resorts, with the option of extending to almost a full year.

Additional colleges and universities in the Greater Orlando area include:

- Barry University (Dwayne O. Andreas School of Law)
- Beacon College (for those with special needs)
- Florida A&M University College of Law
- Florida Technical College
- Full Sail University
- Johnson University Florida
- Lake–Sumter State College
- Seminole State College of Florida
- Southern Technical College
- Valencia College

== Transportation ==
=== Air ===
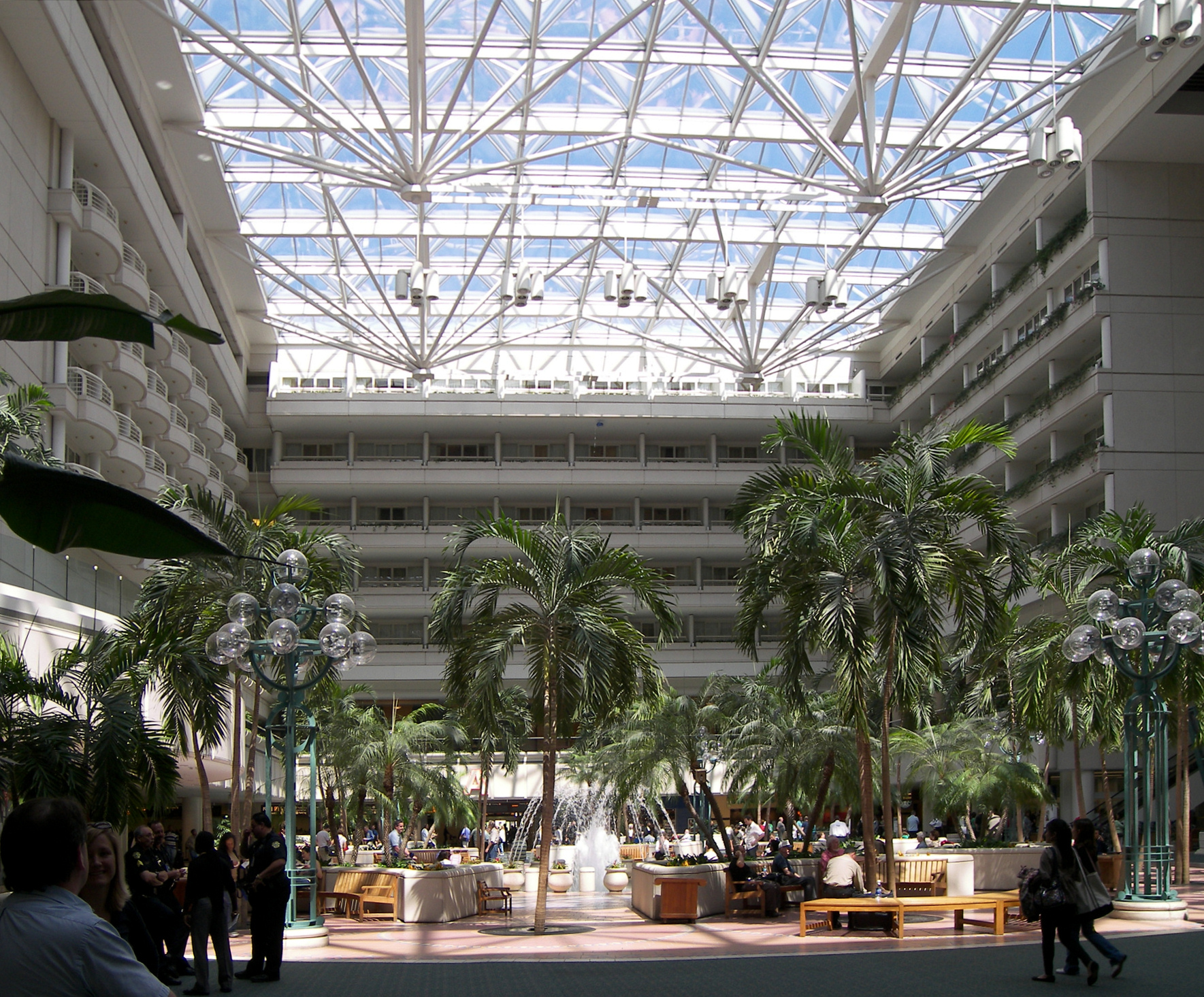
Orlando International Airport atrium, featuring an on-site Hyatt Regency hotel

The primary major airports of the area are Orlando International Airport, at SR 528 Exit 11/SR 417 Exit 17, and Orlando Sanford International Airport, at SR 417 Exit 49.

Orlando International (MCO) is a focus city of JetBlue and Southwest Airlines. AirTran Airways was headquartered in Orlando and had a major hub in Orlando but it was merged into Southwest. JetBlue also has a training facility known as JetBlue University, and is the main training center for JetBlue's pilots, inflight crew, plus support training for its technical operations and customer service crew. JetBlue also provides general aircraft maintenance and LiveTV installation and maintenance in Orlando.

Orlando Sanford International (SFB) is generally served by charter flights from Europe, though it is also a hub for national small-city carrier Allegiant Air and home to Delta Connection Academy, a pilot training school.

In the Combined Statistical Area, Daytona Beach International Airport and Leesburg International Airport also serve the area, and they are used by many tourists seeking to directly connect to Daytona Beach's many local offerings, such as Daytona Beach Bike Week, Speedweeks and Spring Break. It is located so its runways cradle Daytona International Speedway, making it convenient for some fans to arrive in Daytona, watch the Daytona 500 or Coke Zero 400, and then return home the same day. Daytona Beach International also serves as the main airport for pilot training at Embry-Riddle Aeronautical University.

Municipal airports in the region include Orlando Executive Airport, Kissimmee Gateway Airport, Ormond Beach Municipal Airport and DeLand Municipal Airport.

=== Roads and freeways ===
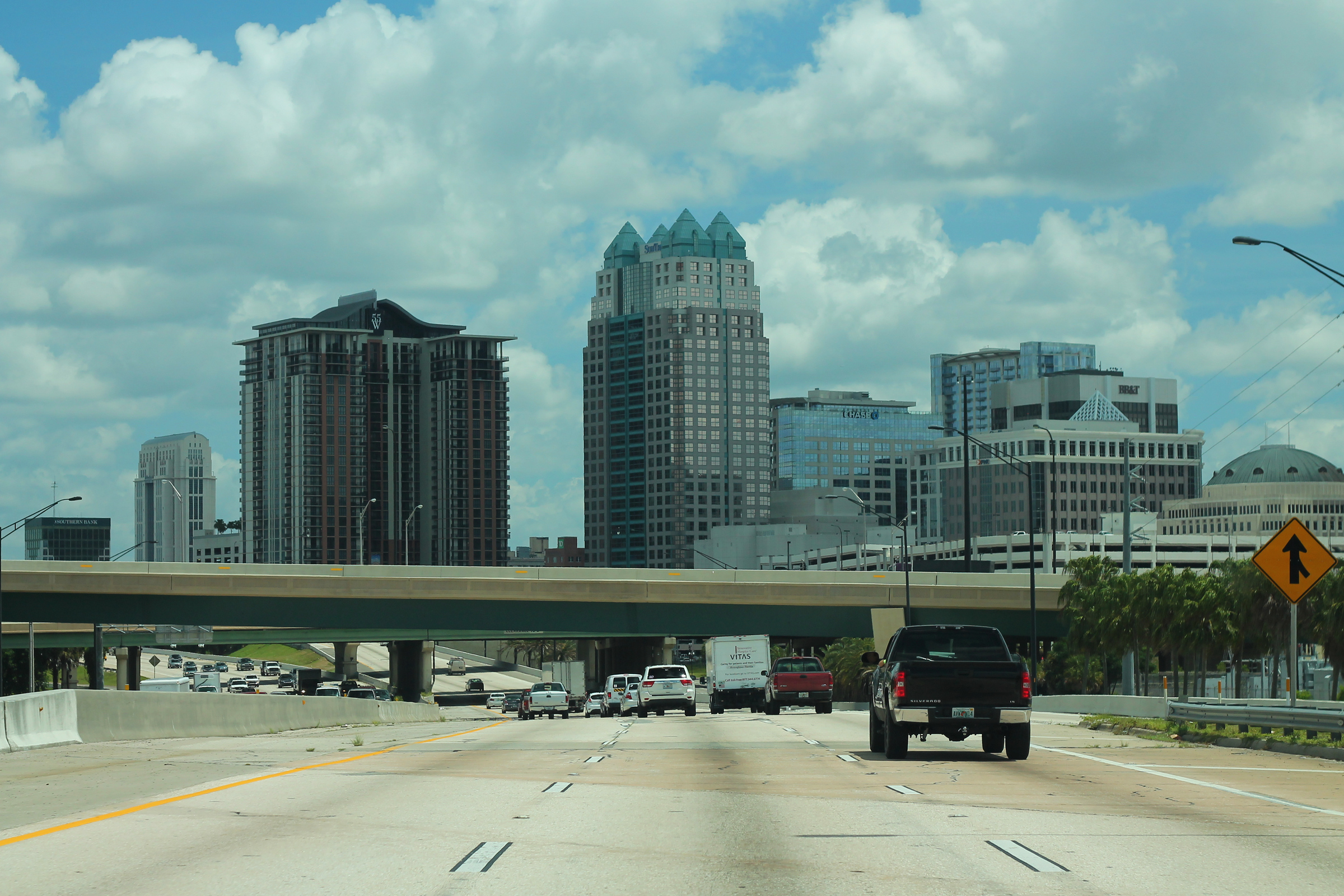
I-4 as it approaches Downtown Orlando

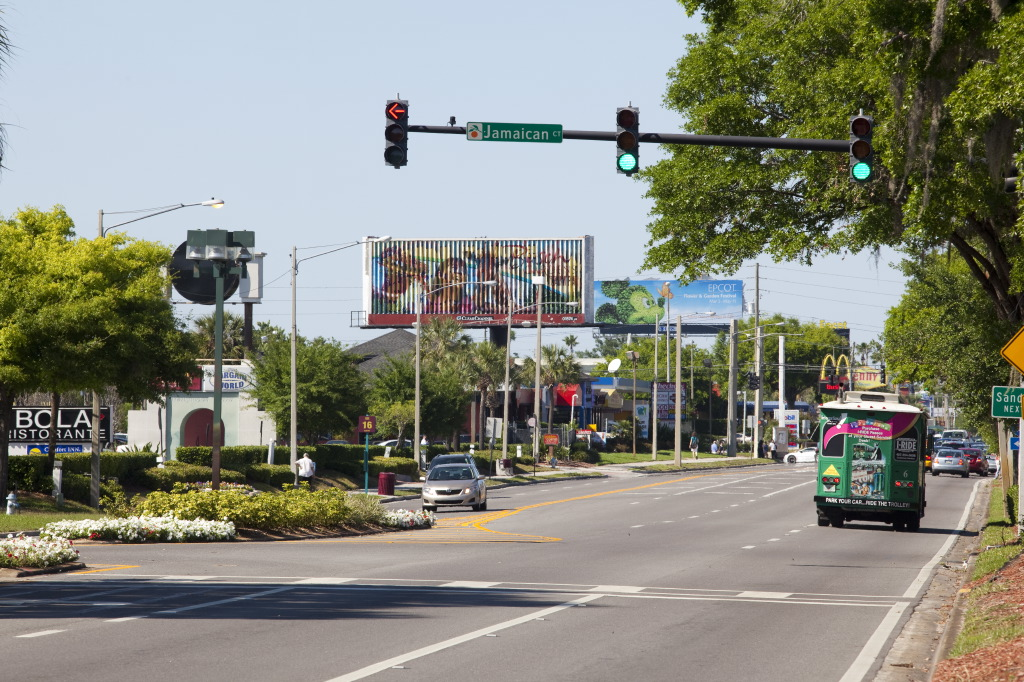
International Drive, a major thoroughfare in the Orlando metropolitan area (the main tourist strip), Orange County

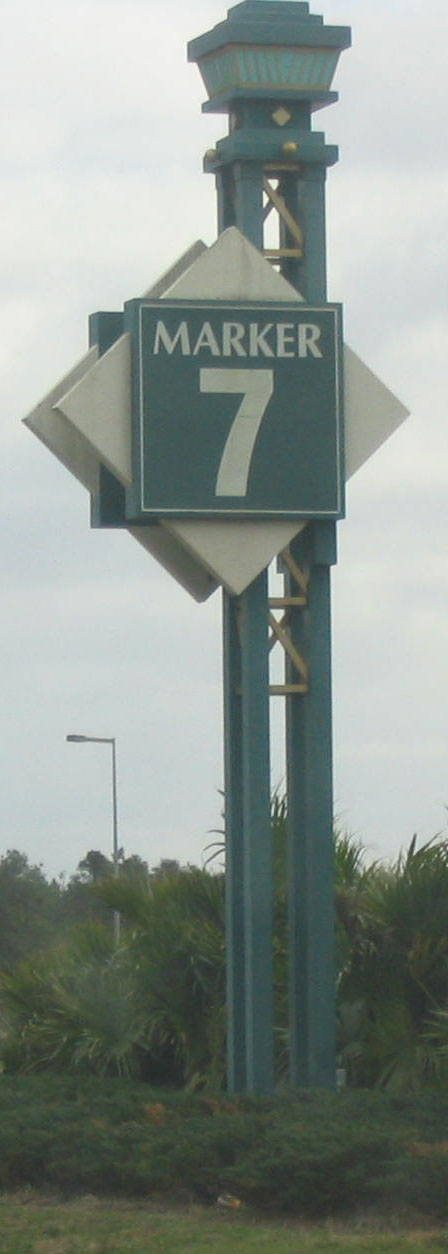
One of the many "mile markers" on U.S. 192's tourist strip in Celebration, Osceola County

Limited-access highways in Greater Orlando include:

- Florida's Turnpike, which heads southeast to the Treasure Coast and South Florida, as well as northwest to connect to Interstate 75 south of Ocala.
- Interstate 4, which meets Florida's Turnpike near the Universal Orlando Resort, heads north through the Orlando area to Daytona Beach and southwest to Lakeland and Tampa (the only entirely non-tolled freeway in the area).
- Interstate 95, Crosses Brevard County, and Volusia County running south connecting Treasure Coast & Miami–Fort Lauderdale–Pompano Beach and North connecting Jacksonville–St. Marys–Palatka & Georgia.
- The Beachline (Formerly Bee Line Expressway; SR 528), which meets I-4 near SeaWorld and connects to the Orlando International Airport, Space Coast, Cape Canaveral, and the John F. Kennedy Space Center.
- The Central Florida GreeneWay (SR 417), which passes around the edge of the eastern half of the area as a beltway, and connects to both Orlando International Airport and Orlando Sanford International Airport.
- The East-West Expressway (SR 408), which crosses the area from west (where it connects to Florida's Turnpike) to east (where it connects to Colonial Drive, south of University of Central Florida), passing through downtown Orlando, where it connects to Interstate 4.
- The Western Expressway (SR 429), which serves as the beltway in the western half of the area, connects to Interstate 4 on both ends from Sanford in the north, through Apopka and Ocoee, and around the west side of Walt Disney World to connect southwest of Kissimmee.
- The Apopka Bypass (SR 414), is a partial tollway beginning at US 441 Orange Blossom Trail west of Apopka to Maitland Blvd at US 441 south of Apopka. From there, the road continues as "Maitland Blvd", but is a surface road. The spur west of Apopka will eventually run north to begin the "Wekiva Expressway".

The Beachline, Central Florida GreeneWay, East-West Expressway and Western Expressway are all run by the Central Florida Expressway Authority. Florida's Turnpike and portions of tollways not inside Orange County are run by Florida's Turnpike Enterprise, a special district of the Florida Department of Transportation.

Major surface highways include US 17, US 92 and US 441 (which overlap through Orlando as Orange Blossom Trail), US 27 (Claude Pepper Highway), US 192 (Irlo Bronson Highway), SR 50 (Colonial Drive and Cheney Highway), John Young Parkway, and International Drive.

=== Transit systems ===
Bus transportation in Orange, Osceola, and Seminole counties is provided by LYNX. LYNX operates 88 routes as of January 28, 2019. LYNX provides service on local, limited-stop (FastLink), and neighborhood, on-demand circulator routes (NeighborLink).

Lynx had express routes into Clermont and Volusia County, but these were eliminated in 2014 due to the opening of SunRail. Volusia County is primarily served locally by Votran and Lake County is primarily served locally by LakeXpress.

The SunRail opened for operation in 2014 and the second phase expansion into Osceola County opened on July 30, 2018, with terminal stations at Poinciana and DeBary. Studies are being conducted to extend SunRail to Orlando International Airport (OIA) and Deland.

=== Rail ===
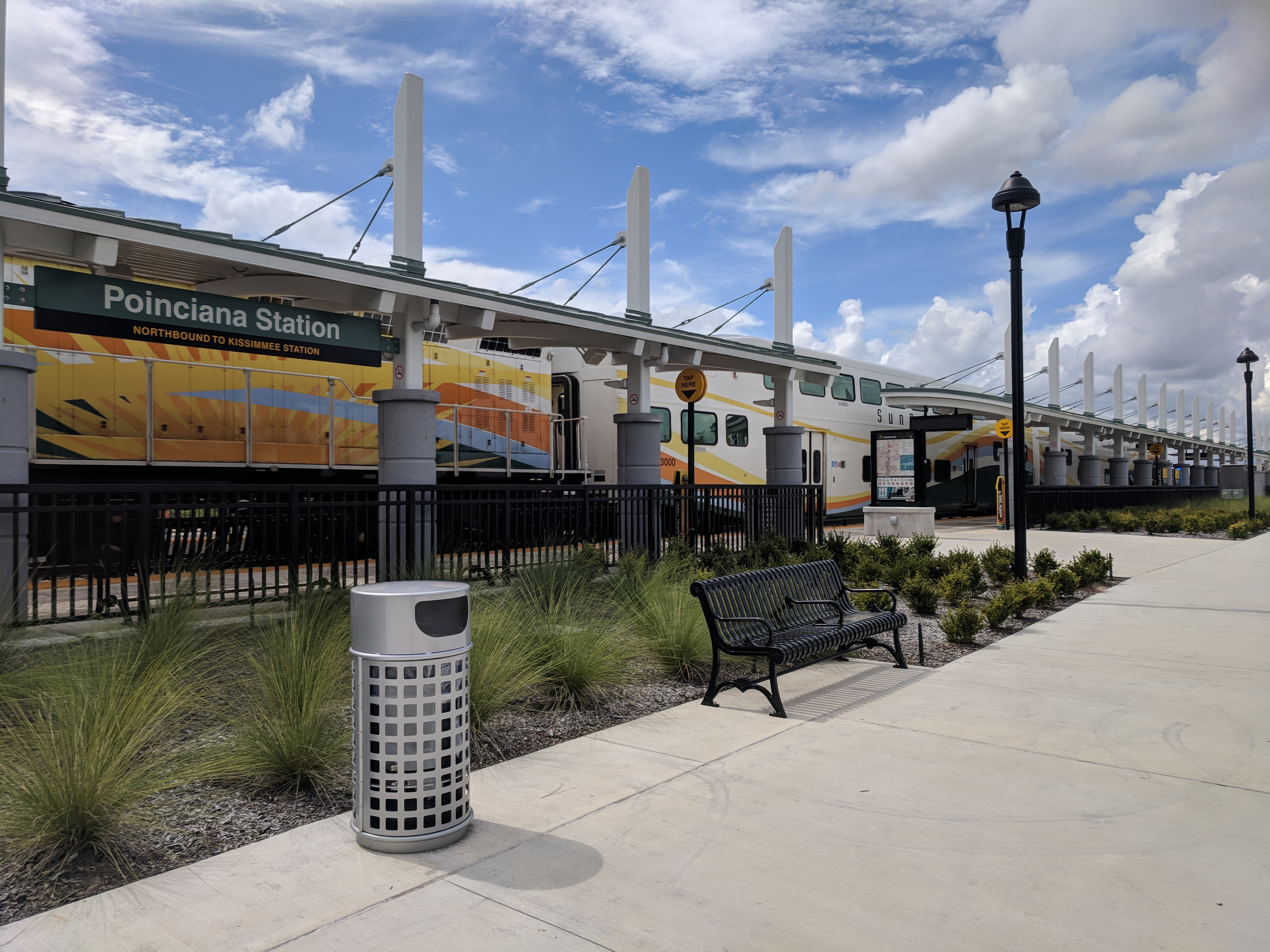
SunRail train stopped at Poinciana station, Osceola and Polk Counties

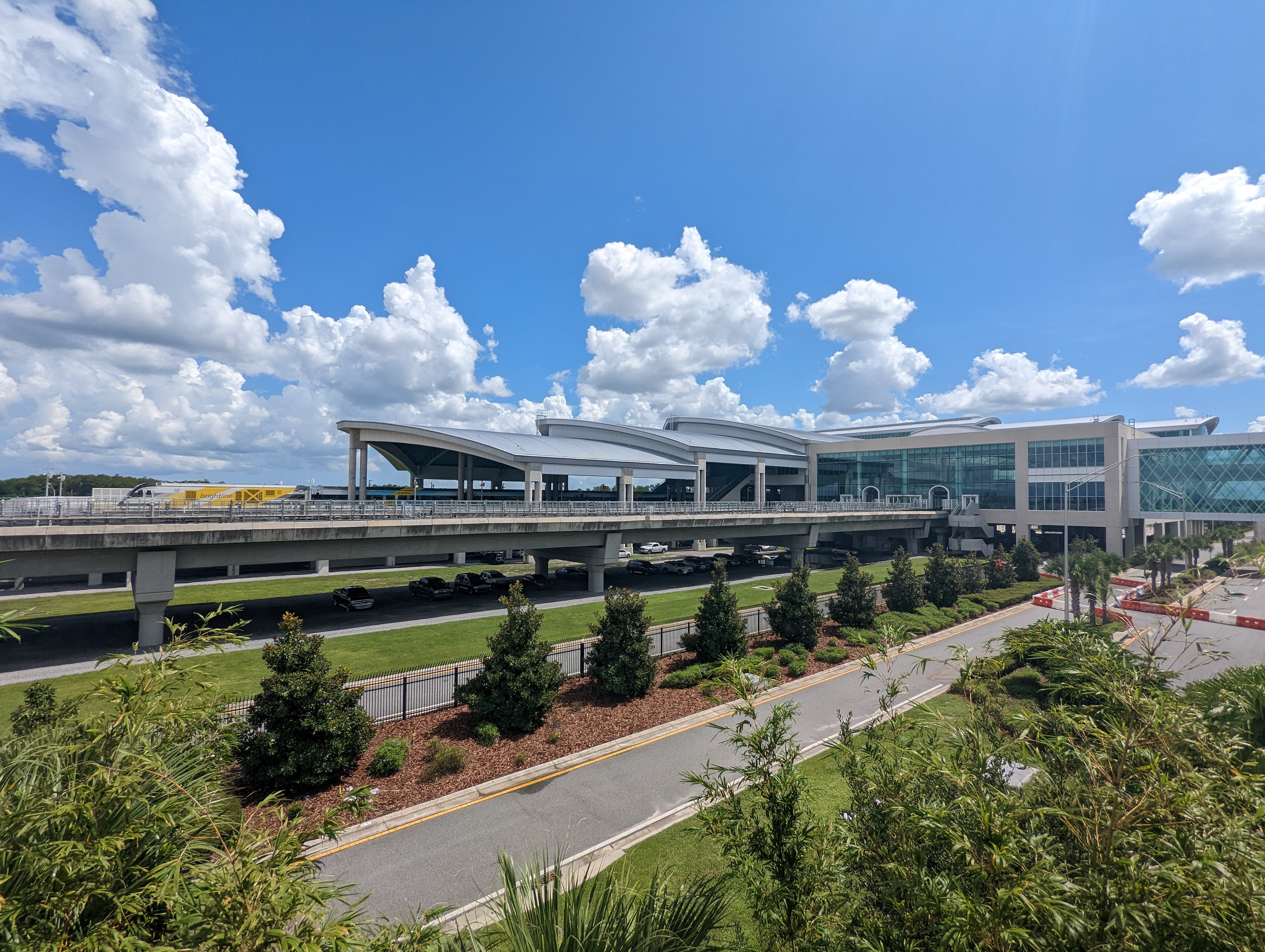
Brightline at Orlando International Airport

SunRail (formerly referred to as Central Florida Commuter Rail) is a commuter rail system in the Greater Orlando, Florida area, linking Poinciana to DeBary through Downtown Orlando. Phase 1 opened in May 2014, and ran between DeBary and Sand Lake Station. Phase II opened in July 2018 and extended to Poinciana through Osceola County with the addition of four new stations.

Church Street Station, once a stop along the Atlantic Coast Line Railroad, has since been redeveloped as an urban night life center, while the station itself will serve as Downtown Orlando's centerpiece SunRail stop.

Amtrak serves stations in the area in Kissimmee, Orlando, Winter Park, Sanford and DeLand. The Sanford station is the southern terminus for the Auto Train, which transports people and their vehicles, without intermediate station stops, directly to Washington, D.C., via Lorton, Virginia. The other stations are served by both the Silver Meteor (which travels to New York City) and the Floridian (which travels to Chicago). Orlando was also eastern terminus of the Sunset Limited, until damage to train bridges caused by Hurricane Katrina in 2005 halted service east of New Orleans. As of April 2017, restoration of Amtrak service from New Orleans to Orlando appears to be unlikely.

Orlando is usually named as the initial focus of plans for a Florida High Speed Rail system in which the majority of its residents had supported, but 2.4 billion dollars of federal funding for this new system were refused by Governor Rick Scott of Florida after taking office in January 2011. Scott said that Florida taxpayers would be stuck with paying for expected large cost overruns if the rail system were built.

Since September 22, 2023, Orlando is also served by Brightline at the Orlando International Airport Intermodal Terminal. The inter-city rail service which provides runs south to Miami via the Florida East Coast Railway. An extension of Brightline to Tampa is also proposed.

== Culture ==
=== Orlando Chinatown ===
A Chinatown (Chinese: 奥兰多唐人街; pinyin: Àolánduō táng rén jiē) is situated at 5060 West Colonial Drive (located outside city limits) as of 2002. According to the West Orlando News, the Chinatown features a monument of Sun Yat Sen, a donation from his granddaughter Lily Sun who unveiled it on the 87th anniversary of his death in 2012, making this the first commercial location to hold such a monument. In March 2013, a paifang was unveiled at the entrance to the Chinatown plaza, "... helping legitimize the plaza as a center for Chinese commerce." The Chinatown features an eclectic blend of Chinese, Korean, Filipino, Vietnamese and Indian cultures through its numerous pan-Asian businesses.

According to an article by the Orlando Weekly, the location of Orlando's Chinatown was once the Westside Crossing Plaza, which was a Walmart shopping center with a Publix supermarket. In 2003, the old shopping center was converted to house "... 60 pan-Asian businesses and restaurants." Financing for the project came from Chinese investors.

The Orlando Sentinel further states that "... by retrofitting the mostly vacant strip center, which includes a former Wal-Mart discount store and Publix supermarket, a group of out-of-state Chinese investors are hoping to draw more than 60 Asian-owned businesses to the site by the end of the year. " The article states that this is "... creating what the project's developers are calling the region's first Chinatown." The amenities include bakeries, restaurants, and an Asian grocery store. So the article further elaborates by saying "... finally, there's a place to buy cuttlefish and black chicken."

Since the project was a success, its report on its conceptualization and development is used as a reference for the real estate and tourism industries.

== Media ==
The primary newspaper of the area is the daily Orlando Sentinel, owned by Tribune Company. It was created as the Orlando Sentinel-Star in 1973 when the Orlando Morning Sentinel and the Orlando Evening Star were merged. It dropped "Star" from the name in 1982. It is also served by various weekly and semi-weekly papers, including Orlando Weekly, The West Orange Times, The East Orlando Sun and the Osceola News-Gazette in Kissimmee.

The extended area is also covered by The Daytona Beach News-Journal and Florida Today.

Greater Orlando makes up a large portion of the "Orlando–Ocala–Daytona Beach, FL" DMA, which ranks No. 19 in size with 1,466,420 households in 2007–08 according to Nielsen Media Research.

All six major broadcast networks are represented in Orlando with their own channels. WESH brought NBC to Orlando when it moved its main operations from Daytona Beach to Eatonville in 1991.

- ABC: WFTV (Analog 9, Digital 39)
- CBS: WKMG (Analog 6, Digital 58)
- NBC: WESH (Analog 2, Digital 11)
- FOX: WOFL (Analog 35, Digital 22)
- The CW: WKCF (Analog 18, Digital 17)
- MNTV: WRBW (Analog 65, Digital 41)

== See also ==
- Central Florida
- Florida tourism industry
- Sports in Orlando, Florida
