= Paradise Heights, Florida =

Unincorporated area in Florida, US

- Census-designated place
- Location in Orange County and the state of Florida
- Coordinates: 28°37′31″N 81°32′37″W
- Country: United States
- State: Florida
- County: Orange

Area
  - Total: 0.46 sq mi (1.19 km^{2})
  - Land: 0.46 sq mi (1.19 km^{2})
  - Water: 0 sq mi (0.00 km^{2})
- Elevation: 95 ft (29 m)

Population (2020)
  - Total: 1,260
  - Density: 2,736.0/sq mi (1,056.37/km^{2})
- Time zone: UTC-5 (Eastern (EST))
  - Summer (DST): UTC-4 (EDT)
- FIPS code: 12-54912
- GNIS feature ID: 2403397

Paradise Heights is a census-designated place and an unincorporated area in Orange County, Florida, United States. As of the 2020 census, Paradise Heights had a population of 1,260. It is part of the Orlando–Kissimmee Metropolitan Statistical Area.

== Geography ==
According to the United States Census Bureau, the CDP has a total area of 1.2 km^{2} (0.5 mi^{2}), all land.

== Demographics ==
Historical population
Census	Pop.	Note	%±
2020	1,260		—
U.S. Decennial Census

=== 2020 census ===
As of the 2020 census, Paradise Heights had a population of 1,260. The median age was 34.8 years. 26.1% of residents were under the age of 18 and 9.5% of residents were 65 years of age or older. For every 100 females there were 107.2 males, and for every 100 females age 18 and over there were 116.0 males age 18 and over.

100.0% of residents lived in urban areas, while 0.0% lived in rural areas.

There were 435 households in Paradise Heights, of which 37.5% had children under the age of 18 living in them. Of all households, 40.7% were married-couple households, 22.3% were households with a male householder and no spouse or partner present, and 22.5% were households with a female householder and no spouse or partner present. About 19.1% of all households were made up of individuals and 6.8% had someone living alone who was 65 years of age or older.

There were 469 housing units, of which 7.2% were vacant. The homeowner vacancy rate was 3.2% and the rental vacancy rate was 6.4%.

Racial composition as of the 2020 census
Race	Number	Percent
White	693	55.0%
Black or African American	123	9.8%
American Indian and Alaska Native	12	1.0%
Asian	14	1.1%
Native Hawaiian and Other Pacific Islander	0	0.0%
Some other race	211	16.7%
Two or more races	207	16.4%
Hispanic or Latino (of any race)	511	40.6%

=== 2000 census ===
As of the census of 2000, there were 1,310 people, 457 households, and 301 families residing in the CDP. The population density was 1,076.2/km^{2} (2,778.2/mi^{2}). There were 498 housing units at an average density of 409.1/km^{2} (1,056.1/mi^{2}). The racial makeup of the CDP was 80.53% White, 2.98% African American, 0.69% Native American, 0.46% Asian, 0.69% Pacific Islander, 12.98% from other races, and 1.68% from two or more races. Hispanic or Latino of any race were 22.82% of the population.

There were 457 households, out of which 34.6% had children under the age of 18 living with them, 43.5% were married couples living together, 15.1% had a female householder with no husband present, and 34.1% were non-families. 25.2% of all households were made up of individuals, and 7.7% had someone living alone who was 65 years of age or older. The average household size was 2.85 and the average family size was 3.35.

In the CDP, the population was spread out, with 28.9% under the age of 18, 11.0% from 18 to 24, 34.0% from 25 to 44, 18.5% from 45 to 64, and 7.6% who were 65 years of age or older. The median age was 32 years. For every 100 females, there were 111.0 males. For every 100 females age 18 and over, there were 113.3 males.

The median income for a household in the CDP was $30,038, and the median income for a family was $34,438. Males had a median income of $22,109 versus $17,200 for females. The per capita income for the CDP was $13,115. About 9.1% of families and 14.9% of the population were below the poverty line, including 23.5% of those under age 18 and 15.4% of those age 65 or over.
