= List of county roads and former state roads in Seminole County, Florida =

- County road shields used in Florida

Highway names
- Interstates: Interstate X (I-X)
- US Highways: U.S. Highway X (US X)
- State: State Road X (SR X)
- County: County Road X (CR X)

System links
- County roads in Florida; County roads in Seminole County

Seminole County, Florida (located in Central Florida) operates a system of county roads that serve all portions of the county. The Seminole County Public Works Department, Engineering Division, is responsible for maintaining all of the Seminole County roads. Most of the county roads are city streets and rural roads.

The numbers and routes of state roads are assigned by the Florida Department of Transportation (FDOT), while county road numbers are assigned by the counties, with guidance from FDOT. North-south routes are generally assigned odd numbers, while east-west routes are generally assigned even numbers. The majority of county road numbers reflect their former status as state roads before they were given to the county in 1980.

== Former SR 13 ==
In the early 1950s, FDOT acquired part of the Kissimmee Valley Line of the Florida East Coast Railway in Orange and Seminole Counties for highway purposes. The proposed state road was numbered as an extension of the existing State Road 13.

Maps of Seminole County indicate that Snow Hill Road, 1 mile (1.6 km) to the east of the former rail line (including the portion through the Little Big Econ State Forest), was designated SR 13 from Brumley Road in Chuluota north to Old Mims Road (original SR 46) near Geneva. It is labeled on maps through 1960, but does not appear in 1971.

== CR 15 (former SR 15) ==
County Road 15 follows Country Club Road, Upsala Road, and Monroe Road from CR 427 north of Longwood north to US 17/92 (SR 15) near the St. Johns River and I-4 exit 104. It passes through central Lake Mary and overlaps CR 46A in western Sanford.

The 1945 definition of SR 15 included an alternate route bypassing Sanford to the west, from north of Longwood to just south of the St. Johns River. During early Interstate Highway System planning, this was to be the route of what became I-4. However, no road was ever built south of CR 427, and maps indicate that a portion in northern Lake Mary was not state maintained. This spur of SR 15 became CR 15 in 1980.

The road is the site of such locations as the Countryside Baptist Church, the Lake Mary History Museum, and a banquet hall known as the Lake Mary Events Center.

== CR 46A (former SR 46A) ==
County Road 46A begins at the south end of CR 431 (Orange Boulevard) near Paola and runs east on H.E. Thomas Jr. Parkway (formerly 25th Street) to US 17/92 and SR 46 in Sanford. Along the way it crosses I-4 at exit 101A and SR 417 at exit 52.

SR 46A was not part of the original 1945 plans, but it was added to the state highway system by the 1950s. It originally began at Paola, north of the west end of CR 46A, and, in Sanford, it followed Country Club Road and 20th Street to end 1/2 mile (0.80 km) north of CR 46A's east end. The more direct route along 25th Street was present by 1971. Maps do not indicate that SR 46A returned to SR 46 at its west end, but maps after 1980, when it became CR 46A, incorrectly show that route continuing west along Markham Road then north on Longwood Markham Road to SR 46 near the Wekiva River. Road signage properly shows west 46A ends at the intersection of H. E. Thomas Parkway and Orange Blvd in Heathrow.

== CR 415 (former SR 415) ==
County Road 415 is signed north-south, but travels directly east-west on 13th Street and Celery Avenue from US 17/92 / SR 46 in Sanford east (signed north) to SR 415 near the St. Johns River.

CR 415 is part of the original SR 415 alignment defined in 1945, hence the north-south signage. When the current SR 415 was built from the St. Johns River south to SR 46 in the late 1970s, it was initially numbered State Road 415A. This route remained in 1980, but by 1984 it had become part of SR 415, and former SR 415 west into Sanford had been given to the county.

== Former SR 418 ==
State Road 418 from the 1945 plan connected SR 46 (then on Old Geneva Road) north of Geneva with the community of Osceola on the St. Johns River. If it was actually taken over as a state road, it had a brief lifetime, as there is no SR 418 on the 1955 county map.

== CR 419 (former SR 419) ==
County Road 419 is a part of the original SR 419 from 1945, beginning at the Orange County line and extending north and northwest through Chuluota to Oviedo. SR 419 now begins in Oviedo and continues in a northwesterly direction to US 17/92 near Lake Mary.

== CR 425 (former SR 425) ==
County Road 425 follows Sanford Avenue from the north end of CR 427 (Ronald Reagan Boulevard), just north of Lake Mary Boulevard, north to SR 46 in Sanford. The current FDOT county map shows two more sections, but Seminole County does not post signs on either. One is on Dean Road from SR 426 south to Orange County, where it is also known as CR 425. The other follows Airport Boulevard between US 17/92 and SR 46, providing a western bypass of central Sanford.

CR 425 is a short piece of SR 425 as defined in 1945. The route began at SR 426 and followed the entire length of Tuskawilla Road (now inventoried as CR 4281). A crossing of Lake Jesup was never built, but SR 425 began again on the north shore at the south end of Sanford Avenue, finally picking up current CR 425 to end at SR 46. By the 1950s, the Airport Boulevard segment had appeared, but maps show that it was only a state road north of Country Club Road (the original alignment of SR 46A). The Tuskawilla Road segment disappeared from maps by 1971, as did shields on Sanford Avenue south of SR 427; the Dean Road segment was never shown as a state road (but Orange County maps showed it as such). SR 425 became a county road in 1980.

== CR 426 (former SR 426) ==
County Road 426 is part of the original 1945 SR 426, extending northeast from the end of present SR 426 in Oviedo northeast to SR 46 in Geneva.

== CR 426A ==
County Road 426A is an extremely short (about 100 feet (30 m)) signed route, extending south on Hall Road from SR 426 to the Orange County line. No shields are shown on any FDOT maps of Seminole County, but Orange County maps show that it was formerly SR 436A, not SR 426A.

== Former SR 426A ==
State Road 426A existed on Red Bug Lake Road (including current Slavia Road) from SR 426 at Slavia west towards Casselberry. It first appeared on maps in 1971, and did not receive a county road number in 1980.

== CR 427 (former SR 427) ==
County Road 427 follows Maitland Avenue and Ronald Reagan Boulevard along the old Dixie Highway from the Orange County line to the south end of CR 425 (Sanford Avenue) just north of Lake Mary Boulevard. Along the way, it passes through downtown Altamonte Springs (where it overlaps SR 436) and Longwood.

SR 427 was not defined in 1945, but by the 1950s it existed along the current extent of CR 427. (However, a short piece in southern Longwood was part of the original route of SR 434, from North Street (where Anchor Road formerly connected) to Warren Avenue.) In 1980 the road was given to Seminole County.

== CR 427A (former SR 427A) ==
County Road 427A is signed along a portion of 27th Street in the southern outskirts of Sanford, from US 17/92 east to CR 425 (Sanford Avenue). A second piece, following Airport Boulevard from CR 425 east to the Orlando Sanford International Airport, appears on the current FDOT map but is not signed.

SR 427A was designated on 27th Street in the mid-1950s. The Airport Boulevard portion appeared by 1971, and both were given to the county in 1980.

== CR 431 (former SR 431) ==
County Road 431 is signed on Orange Boulevard through Paola, extending north from CR 46A. No signs are posted elsewhere along the route, but FDOT GIS data indicates that the north end is at SR 46.

Orange Boulevard was not the original segment of SR 431, which is now SR 434 south of Forest City. This portion appeared on the 1971 county map, extending from Paola (where SR 46A ended) north to SR 46 (then on Wayside Drive). In 1980 it became a county road, and now extends on former SR 46A to the south end of Orange Boulevard.

This road can be used to go from Heathrow directly to Downtown Sanford.

== CR 431B (former SR 431B) ==
County Road 431B is an unsigned designation along Rinehart Road between Lake Mary Boulevard and SR 46, according to FDOT GIS data. It crosses SR 417 at exit 54.

SR 431B was created by 1971, extending north only to SR 46A. The roadway north of SR 46A did not yet exist in 1980, when SR 431B was given to the county.

== Former CR 520 (ex-SR 520) ==
SR 520 was extended by 1955, from its original (and current) west end east of Bithlo along SR 50 and north on Alafaya Trail to Oviedo. The road became CR 520 in 1980, but by 1984 it had returned to the state road system as an extension of SR 434.
