= Florida State Road 434 =

State highway in Florida, United States

State Road 434

Route information
- Maintained by FDOT
- Length: 28.490 mi (45.850 km)
- Existed: 1945–present

Major junctions
- West end: SR 423 in Orlando
- SR 414 in Altamonte Springs; I-4 in Longwood; US 17 / US 92 in Longwood; SR 417 in Winter Springs; SR 419 / SR 426 in Oviedo
- East end: SR 50 in Alafaya

Location
- Country: United States
- State: Florida
- Counties: Orange, Seminole

Highway system
- Florida State Highway System; Interstate; US; State; Former; Pre‑1945; Toll; Scenic
← SR 430	→ SR 435

State Road 434 (SR 434) is a major roadway in the Central Florida area. Starting at SR 424 (Edgewater Drive) just north of Orlando city limits, the road runs north as Forest City Road through Forest City before dropping the name at the Seminole County line. SR 434 continues north and east through Altamonte Springs and Longwood before turning south and east through Winter Springs and Oviedo. SR 434 is called Central Avenue when it first turns south towards downtown Oviedo. After going through downtown Oviedo, SR 434 is called Alafaya Trail from its intersection with Mitchell Hammock Road south to the Orange County line to its end at SR 50 (Colonial Drive). The road continues south as Alafaya Trail only without the state road designation. Alafaya meets with State Road 50 in Union Park, FL.

SR 434 is signed east–west except going south near its intersection with Mitchell Hammock Road and south of SR 424/Edgewater Drive, where it is signed north–south.

== Route description ==
In Seminole County, official maps show SR 434 as being named Sanlando Springs Road through Longwood and Sanford-Oviedo Road through Winter Springs. The road is referred to locally as simply State Road 434, Highway 434, Route 434 or just as 434.

SR 434 is called Alafaya Trail from Mitchell Hammock Road in Oviedo, continuing south into Orange County, to its end at SR 50 (Colonial Drive). Alafaya Trail continues south of Colonial Drive without the SR 434 designation.

In the 1883 plat of Forest City Orange Park, a section of what is now SR 434 south of its intersection with SR 436 was named Bay Street.

Lynx bus route 434 runs along this road from Seminole State College at Altamonte to the University of Central Florida Superstop near Goldenrod.

== History ==
SR 434 was defined in the 1945 renumbering as from a point on SR 436 South for approximately one mile then Northeast to Forest City, thence North and Northeasterly to Longwood, thence South to intersection with SR 436 East of Altamonte Springs; thence Southeasterly to intersection with SR 426 South of Gabriella.

SR 431 was defined as from a point on the old Orlando-Apopka Road near the N.E. corner of Section 4, T. 22 S - R. 29 E. Northerly to intersection with SR 436 at Forest City

The original route of SR 434 had it begin at SR 436 and Bear Lake Road, run south on Bear Lake Road, northeast on Bunnell Road, along the current SR 434 to Longwood, south on CR 427 and Anchor Road, southeast on current SR 436, south on Lake Howell Road, and east on Howell Branch Road to end at SR 426.

At some point, Alafaya Trail from Oviedo south to SR 50 was added as an extension of SR 520. Also around the same time, SR 434 west of Forest City and east of Longwood was removed, and SR 434's east end was extended to SR 419.

Eventually, around 1985, SR 434 was extended in both directions, south from the west end along SR 431 and east and south from the east end along SR 419 and SR 520 (which had, in the meantime, become County Road 520 on Alafaya Trail).

In 2013, a short extension of SR 434 opened, connecting the road directly to SR 423 (John Young Parkway) via a flyover bridge across U.S. Route 441 (US 441 or Orange Blossom Trail). A major goal of this extension was to alleviate I-4 traffic.

On June 2, 2018, a section of SR 434 in Oviedo was closed after an old drainage structure below the road collapsed and caused a 3-foot (0.91 m) wide hole to open up. The road reopened to traffic on June 8, 2018 after repairs were made.

== Major intersections ==
County	Location	mi	km	Destinations	Notes
Orange	Orlando	0.000	0.000	SR 423 south (John Young Parkway)	Interchange
Orange		1.242	1.999	SR 424 south / CR 424 west (Edgewater Drive)	Termini of SR 424 and CR 424
Orange	Eatonville	1.819	2.927	Kennedy Boulevard (CR 438A east)	Western terminus of CR 438A
Seminole	Altamonte Springs	3.39	5.46	SR 414 to I-4	Interchange with Maitland Boulevard
Seminole	Altamonte Springs	5.150	8.288	SR 436 (Semoran Boulevard) – Altamonte Springs, Apopka	
Seminole	Longwood	8.422	13.554	I-4 – Daytona Beach, Orlando	Exit 94 on I-4 (SR 400)
Seminole	Longwood	11.136	17.922	CR 427 (Ronald Reagan Boulevard)	
Seminole	Longwood	12.308	19.808	US 17 / US 92	Unsigned SR 15 / SR 600
Seminole	Winter Springs	14.550	23.416	SR 419 north	Western terminus of SR 419 concurrency
Seminole	Winter Springs	18.85	30.34	SR 417 – Sanford, Orlando	Exit 44 on SR 417 (Central Florida GreeneWay)
Seminole	Oviedo	21.087	33.936	Franklin Street to CR 419 east	
Seminole	Oviedo	21.337	34.339	SR 426 west / CR 419 south (Broadway Street)	Termini of SR 419 and SR 426
Seminole	Oviedo	22.336	35.946	Mitchell Hammock Road to SR 417 – Seminole State College	
Orange	University	26.490	42.632	University Boulevard to SR 417 – University of Central Florida	
Orange	University	28.043	45.131	Challenger Parkway to SR 408	
Orange	University	28.490	45.850	SR 50 (Colonial Drive) / Alafaya Trail south	Continues south without designation
1.000 mi = 1.609 km; 1.000 km = 0.621 mi: Concurrency terminus; Tolled
