= Florida State Road 417 =

Highway in Florida

State Road 417
- SR 417 highlighted in red

Route information
- Maintained by CFX and FTE
- Length: 54.061 mi (87.003 km)
- Existed: December 16, 1988–present

Major junctions
- South end: I-4 in Celebration
- US 17 / US 92 / US 441 in Hunter's Creek: Florida's Turnpike in Southchase; SR 528 in Orlando; SR 408 near Union Park; US 17 / US 92 in Sanford
- North end: I-4 / SR 429 in Sanford

Location
- Country: United States
- State: Florida
- Counties: Osceola, Orange, Seminole

Highway system
- Florida State Highway System; Interstate; US; State; Former; Pre‑1945; Toll; Scenic
← SR 416	→ SR 419

State Road 417 (SR 417), also known as the Central Florida GreeneWay, Seminole County Expressway (depending on the location), Eastern Beltway and Orlando East Bypass, is a controlled-access toll road forming the eastern beltway around the city of Orlando, Florida, United States. It is owned and maintained by the Central Florida Expressway Authority (CFX) and Florida's Turnpike Enterprise. The CFX section was posthumously named after former Orlando Orange County Expressway Authority chairman Jim Greene.

SR 417 was originally planned to be a full beltway around Orlando. Eventually, the beltway was divided, with the west side being designated SR 429, and the east side retaining the SR 417 designation. Until 2024, the two expressways were non-continuous. SR 429 is now extended via Wekiva Parkway to meet SR 417 in the Sanford/Heathrow area.

== Route description ==
Although SR 417 is signed north–south throughout its entire route, it runs east–west between Celebration and CR 15. After the latter road, it runs north–south through the rest of its route.

The Southern Connector as well as the beltway begins at an interchange with I-4 in Celebration. This section, run by Florida's Turnpike Enterprise is 6.4-mile-long (10.3 km), extending to the International Drive interchange.

Between the International Drive interchange and the Orange–Seminole county line, the tollway is known as the Central Florida GreeneWay, and is operated by CFX.

The Seminole Expressway section of the tollway begins at the county line. This section, also run by Florida's Turnpike Enterprise is 17-mile-long (27 km), extends to an interchange with I-4 in Sanford at the end of the beltway.

== Tolls ==
There are six mainline toll plazas on the tollway and have at least one express lane dedicated to E-Pass/SunPass for electronic toll collection (ETC), which do not require motorists to stop at a booth, as well as lanes formerly dedicated for cash (Now replaced with, ETC.). The Florida Turnpike Enterprise (FTE), and Central Florida Expressway Authority (CFX), started to replace ramp toll plazas with ETC, with cash no longer being available as an option at most ramp toll plazas. In January 19, 2025, cash tolls were discontinued for the portion of FTE, leaving drivers having to use a SunPass or E-Pass. The whole tollway went completely electronic, when in August 20, 2025, CFX completely removed cash tolling at its toll plazas.

While both E-Pass and SunPass are accepted at all interchanges along the toll road, portions maintained by CFX are signed as E-Pass and portions maintained by FTE are signed as SunPass.

== History ==
=== Phase I: The Eastern Beltway ===
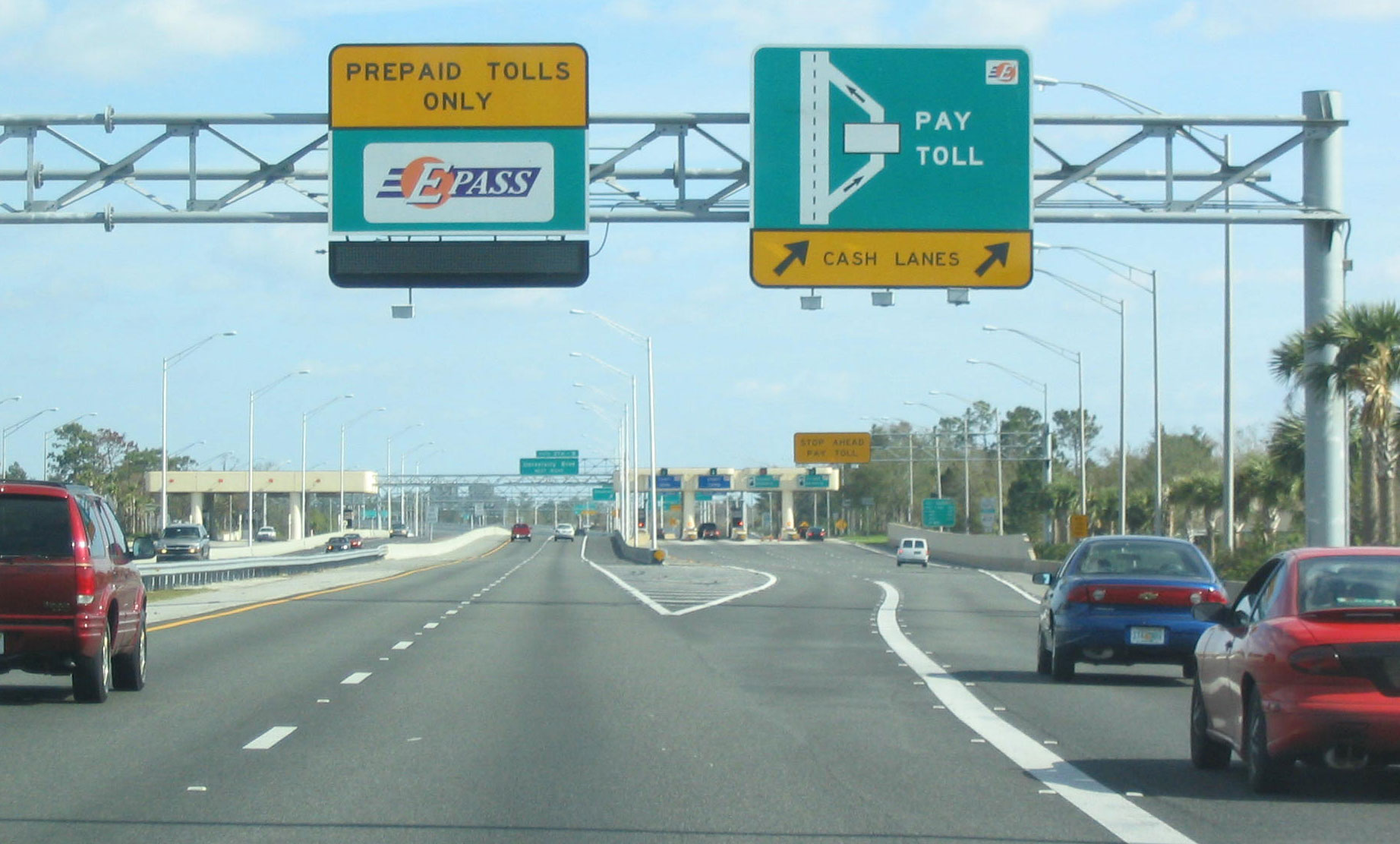
Northbound at the University Mainline Toll Plaza, recently rebuilt with high-speed (express) lanes.

The first phase of SR 417, then termed the Eastern Beltway, extended from what was the east end of the East–West Expressway northward to SR 426 (Aloma Avenue) in Seminole County. It allowed commuters to bypass the crowded Semoran Boulevard, as well as give expressway access to the University of Central Florida.

The OOCEA began construction of phase I in July 1987 and the road was opened to the public on December 16, 1988, at a cost of $105 million, with $35 million being spent on acquiring the right-of-way for the 6-mile (9.7 km) route.

=== Phase II: The Southeastern Beltway ===
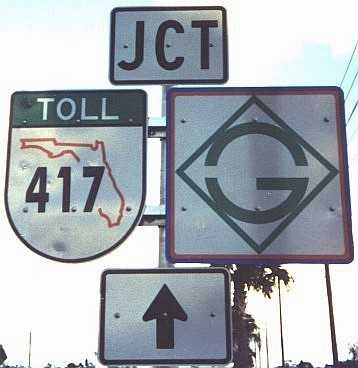
GreeneWay shield, formerly used in Orange County

Phase II, the "Southeastern Beltway", was considered one of the most important parts of the Eastern Beltway because motorists could use this portion to travel from downtown Orlando to the Orlando International Airport without ever getting off the expressway system. This portion of the GreeneWay had passed through some of the most barren portions of Orange County. It skirts the Econlockhatchee River marshes that cover some of eastern Orange and northern Osceola.

The OOCEA began construction of the Southeastern Beltway, from Colonial Drive to the Beachline Expressway in January 1989, and opened ahead of schedule in July 1990. The 7.6-mile (12.2 km) route cost $72 million, with an estimated $13 million being spent on acquiring the right-of-way.

=== Phase III: The Southern Connector ===
The "Southern Connector" was to become a route extending from SR 528 all the way to SR 535. The OOCEA began construction of the 22-mile (35 km) road in November 1991 and completed construction July 1, 1993, at a cost of $273 million. It was during the construction of this section that the Orange County portion of the beltway project was renamed the Central Florida GreeneWay. From 2015 through 2016, a limited interchange was completed with SR 417 and Florida's Turnpike. The remaining ramps to complete the full interchange were opened May 21, 2021.

=== Phase IV: The Seminole Expressway ===
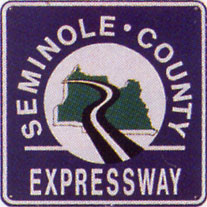
The original logo for the Seminole County Expressway

The Seminole Expressway, the northern leg of SR 417, is located in Seminole County and is owned and operated by Florida's Turnpike Enterprise. The section south of Aloma Avenue to the county line (less than one mile) was acquired from the Seminole County Expressway Authority in April 1990 as part of Florida's Turnpike Expansion Program authorized by Senate Bill 1316.

The initial stretch, from just south of Aloma to US 17/92 opened in phases in 1994. The final six miles (10 km) connect to Interstate 4 near Sanford/Lake Mary, and opened to traffic on September 15, 2002, approximately seven months ahead of the final schedule. This leg features only one mainline toll plaza (just south of CR 427), but it is also the priciest toll plaza on SR 417 at $2.50 per vehicle. This section also features the only "free movement" on SR 417. No toll is collected for motorists traveling between I-4 and Rinehart Road (whose interchange with SR 417 is used for travelers on SR 46 and CR 46A to get to and from SR 417).

=== Phase V: Southern Connector Extension ===
Due to the multiple entities involved, which included OOCEA, Walt Disney World, Osceola County, private landowners, the Reedy Creek Improvement District, and the Florida's Turnpike Enterprise, building the southernmost 6.4-mile (10.3 km) between I-4 and the GreeneWay became a complex task. Eventually, they agreed on the Southern Connector Extension, as well as the 12.4-mile (20.0 km) Osceola Parkway.

Florida's Turnpike began construction of the 6.4-mile (10.3 km) extension from the GreeneWay to I-4 in 1994 and completed construction in mid 1996. The project cost almost $153 million, with $74 million coming from contributions from the private parties involved in building this route, making it possible to get from Walt Disney World to the Orlando International Airport without ever driving on Interstate 4.

=== Later changes ===
In 2008, the Turnpike Enterprise began a $49 million project to reconstruct the Lake Jesup toll plaza, allowing for the inclusion of SunPass/E-PASS express lanes. The project was completed in April 2011.

On December 14, 2011, the northern terminus of SR 417 was extended from Interstate 4 to International Parkway. The $11.4 million project began construction on November 29, 2010.

The Turnpike Enterprise and OOCEA (now CFX) agreed to build a partial interchange between SR 417 and Florida's Turnpike in the late 2000s, after negotiations dating back to a 1991 field study. The interchange was built in two phases. The first phase, built by CFX, added ramps from southbound SR 417 to southbound Florida's Turnpike and from northbound Florida's Turnpike to northbound SR 417. Construction on the first phase began in September 2013 and opened on January 26, 2015. The second phase to complete the interchange was built by the FTE, with construction beginning in late 2014 and completed in 2017, several years ahead of its original completion date.

In January 2015, the speed limit along the entire highway was raised to 70 mph (110 km/h) from the previous 65 mph (105 km/h) speed limit. The increase followed a study that found 85% of drivers on the highway already drove between 70–80 mph (110–130 km/h).

In 2019, construction started on a new interchange between SR 429 (Wekiva Parkway), SR 417, and Interstate 4, and was completed in 2024 to finish the beltway around Orlando.

The OOCEA 2030 Master Plan suggested widening the entire expressway to six lanes from International Drive to the Seminole County line. As of 2017, that was the case for the portion from SR 528 to the Seminole County line. In October 2025, CFX completed the capacity improvements of SR 417 from SR 528 to International Drive from four to six lanes (three lanes in each direction). In this 21 mile portion, CFX implemented Flex Lanes, an incident management system. When an incident closes one of the main travel lanes, new overhead dynamic signs indicate which lanes are opened and closed. A new wider median shoulder will open and act as a travel lane to keep traffic moving while enhancing safety. CFX also implemented these Flex Lanes on portions of the Western Beltway SR 429.

== Future ==
Florida's Turnpike Enterprise completed a project development & environment study (PD&E) to evaluate the widening of the Seminole Expressway, the portion of SR 417 north of University Boulevard. Construction between University Boulevard and SR 434 was scheduled to begin in 2020, but did not start until late 2024.

== Exit list ==
County	Location	mi	km	Exit	Destinations	Notes
Osceola	Celebration	0.000	0.000		I-4 west / World Drive – Tampa	Half-Y interchange; I-4 exit 62B
Osceola	Celebration	0.3	0.48	Celebration Toll Plaza		
Osceola	Celebration	1.012	1.629	2	Celebration Avenue to US 192	Diamond interchange; tolled southbound exit and northbound entrance
Osceola	Celebration	2.311	3.719	3	Osceola Parkway (CR 522) – Magic Kingdom, Disney's Hollywood Studios, Disney's Animal Kingdom	Partial cloverleaf interchange; tolled southbound exit and northbound entrance
Orange	Lake Buena Vista	5.098	8.204	6	International Drive / SR 536 west (World Center Drive) to SR 535 / I-4 east – Epcot, Disney Springs	Half-Y interchange, southbound exit and northbound entrance; transition from FTE to CFX maintenance
Orange	Lake Buena Vista	6.2	10.0	John Young Mainline Toll Plaza		
Orange	Hunter's Creek	8.659	13.935	10	CR 423 (John Young Parkway)	Partial cloverleaf interchange; tolled southbound exit and northbound entrance
Orange	Hunter's Creek	10.032	16.145	11	US 17 / US 92 / US 441 (Orange Blossom Trail / SR 500 / SR 600) – Kissimmee	Folded diamond/partial cloverleaf interchange; tolled southbound exit and northbound entrance
Orange	Southchase	11.02	17.73	12	Florida's Turnpike – Miami, Ocala	Cloverstack interchange; Florida's Turnpike exit 251; northbound Turnpike uses open road tolling
Orange	Meadow Woods	12.377	19.919	14	Landstar Boulevard	Diamond interchange; tolled northbound exit and southbound entrance
Orange	Meadow Woods	14.3	23.0	Boggy Creek Mainline Toll Plaza		
Orange	Orlando	15.903	25.593	17A	International Airport	Semi-directional T interchange; via South Access Road; tolled southbound exit and northbound entrance; opened February 2016
Orange	Orlando	15.903	25.593	17B	SR 527A (Boggy Creek Road) / CR 530	Diamond interchange; tolled southbound exit and northbound entrance
Orange	Orlando				SR 534 east – St. Cloud	Under design by CFX to be constructed in three phases and 14 miles in total length from SR-417 to Nova Road in Osceola County
Orange	Orlando	17.996	28.962	19	Lake Nona Boulevard	Diamond interchange; tolled southbound exit and northbound entrance; to UCF Lake Nona Hospital, Nemours Children's Hospital
Orange	Orlando	20.550	33.072	22	CR 15 (Narcoosee Road)	Diamond interchange; tolled southbound exit and northbound entrance
Orange	Orlando	22.017	35.433	23	Moss Park Road	Partial cloverleaf interchange; tolled southbound exit and northbound entrance
Orange	Orlando	22.939	36.917	24	Dowden Road	Partial cloverleaf interchange; tolled southbound exit and northbound entrance
Orange	Orlando	24.571	39.543	26	SR 528 (Beachline Expressway) – International Airport, Kennedy Space Center, Cocoa	Cloverstack interchange; SR 528 exit 16; to Port Canaveral, Orange County Convention Center, Sea World Orlando, and Universal Orlando
Orange	Orlando	26.482	42.619	27	Lee Vista Boulevard	Diamond interchange; tolled southbound exit and northbound entrance
Orange		27.2	43.8	Curry Ford Mainline Toll Plaza		
Orange		28.785	46.325	30	SR 552 (Curry Ford Road)	Diamond interchange; tolled southbound exit and northbound entrance
Orange		31.525	50.735	33	SR 408 (East–West Expressway) – Orlando, Titusville	Cloverstack interchange; signed as exits 33A (east) and 33B (west); SR 408 exit 18
Orange		33.217	53.458	34	SR 50 (Colonial Drive)	Trumpet/partial cloverleaf interchange; tolled northbound exit and southbound entrance
Orange		34.7	55.8	University Mainline Toll Plaza		
Orange		35.486	57.109	37	University Boulevard	Partial cloverleaf interchange; signed as exits 37A (east) and 37B (west) northbound; tolled southbound exit and northbound entrance
Orange–Seminole county line				Transition from CFX to FTE maintenance; Northern terminus of Central Florida Greeneway; Southern terminus of Seminole Expressway		
Seminole	Oviedo	37.109	59.721	38	SR 426 (Aloma Avenue)	Partial cloverleaf interchange; tolled northbound exit and southbound entrance
Seminole	Oviedo	40.308	64.869	41	Red Bug Lake Road	Partial cloverleaf interchange; tolled northbound exit and southbound entrance; to Oviedo Medical Center and Oviedo Mall
Seminole	Winter Springs	42.716	68.745	44	SR 434 (SR 419)	Diamond interchange; unsigned concurrency with SR419; tolled southbound exit and northbound entrance
Seminole	Lake Jesup	43.518– 45.022	70.035– 72.456	Bridge		
Seminole		46.7	75.2	Lake Jesup Toll Plaza		
Seminole	Sanford				SR 452 east (Seminole Connector)	Under design by CFX to be a 1.6-mile expressway costing 200 million dollars to connect SR 417 with Orlando Sanford International Airport; Will be nortbound exit, southbound entrance; Construction slated for 2031
Seminole	Sanford	48.211	77.588	49	CR 427 (Ronald Reagan Boulevard) / Lake Mary Boulevard – Orlando Sanford International Airport	Diamond interchange; tolled southbound exit and northbound entrance
Seminole	Sanford	49.258	79.273	50	US 17 / US 92 – Sanford	Partial cloverleaf interchange; tolled southbound exit and northbound entrance; to HCA Florida Lake Monroe Hospital
Seminole	Sanford	51.101	82.239	52	CR 46A (H.E. Thomas Jr. Parkway) – Sanford, Lake Mary	Diamond interchange; tolled southbound exit and northbound entrance; to Amtrak Auto Train Terminal
Seminole	Sanford	53.627	86.304	54	CR 431B (Rinehart Road) – Sanford, Lake Mary	Folded diamond/partial cloverleaf interchange
Seminole	Sanford	54.316	87.413	55A	I-4 – Orlando, Daytona Beach	Cloverstack interchange; southbound entrance; I-4 exit 101B
Seminole	Sanford	55.125	88.715	55B	International Parkway – Heathrow	Diamond interchange
Seminole	Sanford	55.125	88.715		SR 429 south (Wekiva Parkway) – Mount Dora	Continuation beyond I-4 opened on January 26, 2024
1.000 mi = 1.609 km; 1.000 km = 0.621 mi: Electronic toll collection; Incomplete access; Route transition

== See also ==
- Central Florida Expressway Authority
