= Florida State Road 46 =

Highway in Florida, United States

State Road 46
- SR 46 highlighted in red

Route information
- Maintained by FDOT
- Length: 47.466 mi (76.389 km)
- Existed: 1945 renumbering (definition)–present

Western segment
- West end: US 441 / CR 46 in Mount Dora
- East end: SR 453 near Mount Dora

Eastern segment
- West end: SR 429 / CR 46A near Mount Plymouth
- Major intersections: I-4 near Sanford; US 17 / US 92 in Sanford; I-95 near Mims
- East end: US 1 in Mims

Location
- Country: United States
- State: Florida
- Counties: Lake, Seminole, Volusia, Brevard

Highway system
- Florida State Highway System; Interstate; US; State; Former; Pre‑1945; Toll; Scenic
← SR 45A	→ SR 47

State Road 46 (SR 46) is an east–west route in central Florida consisting of two separate noncontiguous segments, running from U.S. Route 441 (US 441) and County Road 46 (CR 46) in Mount Dora to State Road 453 (SR 453) southwest of Sorrento and from State Road 429 (SR 429) and County Road 46A (CR 46A) northeast of Mount Plymouth to US 1 in Mims. Along the way, it crosses the Wekiva River and, further east, the St. Johns River near the Econlockhatchee River.

County Road 46 continues west from the western terminus of the western segment to County Road Old 441 in Mount Dora.

== Route description ==
The western segment of State Road 46 begins as Sanford Road at an at-grade intersection with US 441, where it changes from a County Road to a State Road. Here, there are direct ramp movements connecting southbound US 441 with eastbound State Route 46 and westbound State Road 46 to northbound US 441. Continuing east, roughly paralleling the former Sanford and Lake Eustis Railway right of way to the north, the western segment of SR 46 terminates at an intersection with SR 453 at the latter's northern terminus.

The eastern segment of SR 46 begins at an at-grade intersection with CR 46A and ramps which lead to SR 429 at a modified diamond interchange. Here, State Road 46 runs along the former Sanford and Lake Eustis Railway right of way as a two-lane frontage road to SR 429. The two highways continue east before leaving the forest on a bridge over the Wekiva River at the Lake-Seminole County line and running along the south end of Lower Wekiva River Preserve State Park. After crossing the Wekiva River into Seminole County, SR 46 splits into a pair of one-lane parallel one-way frontage roads to SR 429, having roundabouts at Longwood Markham Road, Yankee Lake Road, Lake Markham Road, and Glade View Drive, also having on and off-ramps with SR 429 west of Longwood Markham Road and east of Yankee Lake Road.

SR 429 turns away from SR 46 west of Orange Boulevard but not before having a westbound SR 46 to southbound SR 429 onramp and a northbound SR 429 to eastbound SR 46 offramp. Here, SR 46 becomes a four lane divided highway before reaching an interchange with I-4, where SR 46 enters the city of Sanford. Continuing east, it joins a concurrency with U.S. Route 17/92 at an intersection at Monroe Road, the latter of these routes being in a wrong-way concurrency. Along this segment, US 17/92/SR 46 passes by the Sanford SunRail station before it climbs a bridge over the CSX Sanford Subdivision then intersects Persimmon Avenue, a road leading to the Sanford Auto Train Station, and former passenger station. Eventually the triple-concurrency enters the City of Sanford where it is renamed West First Street. Closer to downtown Sanford the divider ends west of Avocado Avenue, but begins again before it turns south onto South French Avenue. During this triple-concurrency, US 17-92-SR 46 intersects a pair of railroad crossings at a junction of two freight lines, and then another one at the intersection of West 13th Street, also the western terminus of CR 415.

SR 46 then branches off to the east again at H.E. Thomas Jr. Parkway (CR 46A) and 25th Street. SR 46 runs along the northern border of the Orlando Sanford International Airport, then after the southern terminus of SR 415, uses a bridge over Lake Jesup at the St. Johns River then become Geneva Avenue as it heads southeast. East of Geneva, the road crosses the St. Johns River itself using the Mims Bridge south of Lake Harney, and entering Volusia County. The journey through Volusia is short-lived though, because the road quickly enters Brevard County and turns straight east at Southmere, where it becomes Carpenter Road. SR 46 finally enters Mims in the vicinity of I-95 at Exit 223, and then ends at US 1. After US 1, Main Street continues briefly before becoming a dirt road that terminates at Hammock Road, also a dirt road.

- In 2012, the Florida Legislature designated the Brevard County section as the Harry T. and Harriette V. Moore Memorial Highway.

== History ==
The intersection at the western terminus of SR 46 and US 441 was previously a diamond interchange, but was downgraded as part of the Wekiva Parkway project.

CR 46A previously cut through a portion of the Seminole State Forest and met SR 46 further east, but was realigned to meet SR 46 west of it to reduce its impact.

Between its western intersection with SR 429 at CR 46A and the Lake-Seminole County Line, SR 46 was realigned to follow the alignment of SR 429, resulting in a few segments of highway being bypassed and orphaned.

SR 46 was truncated at its intersections with SR 453 southwest of Sorrento and its western intersection with SR 429 at CR 46A when the Wekiva Parkway project was completed in 2024, resulting in two discontinuous segments. SR 46 formerly followed Sanford Road and Sorrento Avenue through Sorrento and Mount Plymouth along the former railway right of way.

== Major intersections ==
County	Location	mi	km	Destinations	Notes
Lake	Mount Dora	0.000	0.000	End of state maintenance, western terminus of western segment	
Lake	Mount Dora	0.07	0.11	US 441 (SR 500) / CR 46 west – Apopka, Orlando, Eustis, Tavares	
Lake		2.34	3.77	SR 453 south to SR 429 – Orlando, Daytona Beach	Interchange, eastern terminus of western segment
Lake	Gap in route				
Lake		7.626	12.273	To SR 429 / CR 46A west to SR 46 west	SR 429 exit 44, western terminus of eastern segment
Seminole		13.940	22.434	SR 429	SR 429 exit 50
Seminole		14.042	22.598	Longwood Markham Road (CR 46A east)	
Seminole		15.272	24.578	SR 429 south – Apopka, Mount Dora	SR 429 exit 52, northbound exit and southbound entrance
Seminole		16.654	26.802	Orange Boulevard (CR 431)	
Seminole		17.576	28.286	International Parkway to CR 46A / SR 417	
Seminole		18.18	29.26	I-4 (SR 400) to SR 417 – Orlando, Daytona Beach	I-4 exit 101C
Seminole	Sanford	19.099	30.737	US 17 north / US 92 west (Monroe Road / SR 15 north / SR 600 west) / CR 15 south (Upsala Road) – Lake Monroe, Central Florida Zoo	West end of US 17 / US 92 / SR 15 / SR 600 overlap
Seminole	Sanford	20.328	32.715	Martin Luther King Jr. Boulevard to SR 417 – Airport	
Seminole	Sanford	22.108	35.579	North French Avenue (former US 17/92 north) - Old Lake Monroe Pier; 1st Street - East - Business District	Former west end of US 17 / US 92 / SR 15 / SR 600 overlap
Seminole	Sanford	22.875	36.814	CR 415 north (13th Street)	
Seminole	Sanford	23.832	38.354	US 17 south / US 92 east (French Avenue / SR 15 south / SR 600 east) / CR 46A west (H.E. Thomas Jr. Parkway) to SR 417	East end of US 17 / US 92 / SR 15 / SR 600 overlap
Seminole	Sanford	24.331	39.157	CR 425 south (Sanford Avenue) – Orlando-Sanford International Airport	
Seminole	Sanford	27.492	44.244	SR 415 north / Lake Mary Boulevard – New Smyrna Beach, Daytona Beach, Osteen, Airport	
Seminole	Geneva	34.871	56.119	CR 426 west – Oviedo, Winter Park	
St. Johns River		39.924– 40.155	64.251– 64.623		
Volusia	No major junctions				
Brevard		51.20	82.40	I-95 (SR 9) – Jacksonville, Miami	I-95 exit 223
Brevard	Mims	52.752	84.896	US 1 (SR 5) – New Smyrna Beach, Titusville	Eastern terminus of eastern segment
1.000 mi = 1.609 km; 1.000 km = 0.621 mi: Concurrency terminus; Electronic toll collection

== Related routes ==
=== County Road 46 ===
County Road 46
- Location: Mount Dora

County Road 46 is a county extension of State Road 46 in Mount Dora in Lake County in Florida. It runs along East First Avenue from CR Old 441 in the west to a diamond interchange with U.S. Route 441 and SR 46 in the east. West of Old CR 441, East First Avenue is a city street in Mount Dora.

=== State Road 46A and County Road 46A (Lake County) ===
State Road 46A and County Road 46A
- Location: Northeast of Mount Plymouth-Sorrento

State Road 46A and County Road 46A are a contiguous pair of suffixed routes of SR 46 along the southwest side of Seminole State Forest in Lake County. It runs along East First Avenue from State Road 44 northeast of Mount Dora and Eustis. The road transitions from county to state maintenance slightly north of the junction with SR 46 at the point where the divided median ends, and SR 46A continues to SR 429 northeast of Mount Plymouth. The entire road is signed as CR 46A.

=== County Road 46A (Seminole County) ===
County Road 46A
- Location: Paola-Sanford

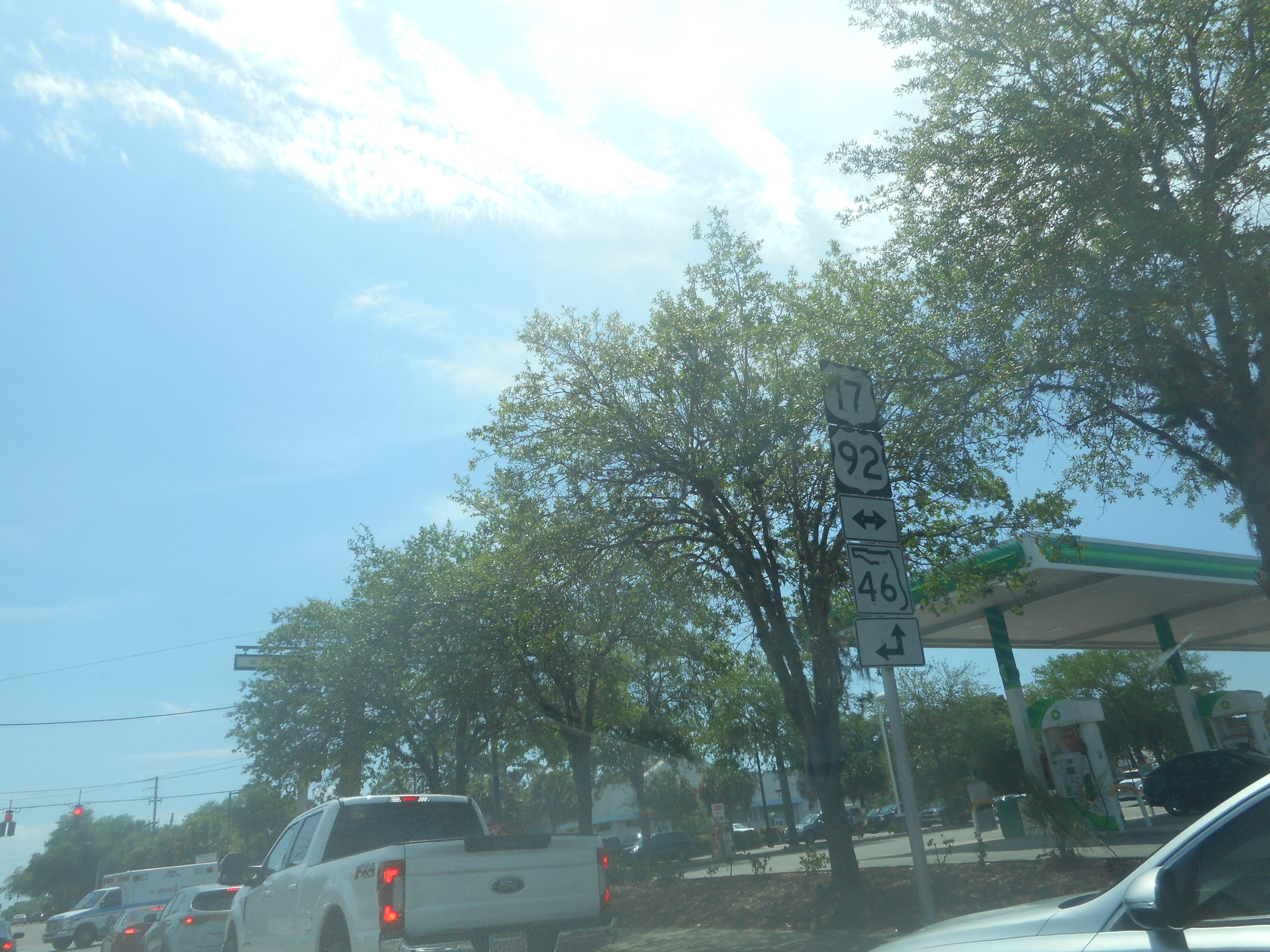
The eastern terminus of Seminole County Road 46A at the intersection of US 17-92 and the south (and west) end of the overlap with Florida State Road 46 in Sanford, Florida.

County Road 46A is another county suffixed route of SR 46 in Seminole County. It is signed along H.E. Thomas Jr. Parkway (former 25th Street) from CR 431 east to US 17/92 / SR 46 in Sanford. Along the way it crosses I-4 at Exit 101A and SR 417 at Exit 52.SR 46A was not part of the original 1945 plans, but it was added to the state highway system by the 1950s. It originally began at Paola, north of the west end of CR 46A, and, in Sanford, it followed Country Club Road and 20th Street to end 1/2 mile (0.80 km) north of CR 46A's east end. The more direct route along 25th Street was present by 1971. Maps do not indicate that SR 46A returned to SR 46 at its west end, but maps after 1980, when it became CR 46A, incorrectly show that route continuing west along Markham Road then north on Longwood Markham Road to SR 46 near the Wekiva River. Road signage properly shows west 46A ends at the intersection of H. E. Thomas Parkway and Orange Blvd in Heathrow (CR 431).

=== State Road 460 ===
State Road 460
- Location: Lake County
- Length: 0.119 mi (192 m)

State Road 460, known locally as Cypress Mill Road, is a road that runs 0.119 miles (0.192 km) from Red Hibiscus Court to Sleepy Bear Lane in unincorporated Lake County. The road is part of a realignment of Cypress Mill Road to the north as both it and what is now known as Red Hibiscus Court (former Cypress Mill Road) are part of the former alignment of SR 46 prior to the construction of the Wekiva Parkway.

=== State Road 461 ===
State Road 461
- Location: Lake County
- Length: 0.117 mi (188 m)

State Road 461, known locally as Old McDonald Road, is a road that runs 0.117 miles (0.188 km) from beneath the SR 46 overpass to eastbound Cypress Mill Road (former SR 46) in unincorporated Lake County. The road was constructed as part of the Wekiva Parkway project.

=== State Road 462 ===
State Road 462
- Location: Lake County
- Length: 0.129 mi (208 m)

State Road 462, part of Deerwood Farms Road, is 0.129 miles (0.208 km) long and runs to the south of SR 429. The road used to connect to the former alignment of SR 46, but ends where the westbound road used to exist. SR 467 exists slightly to the east.

=== State Road 463 ===
State Road 463
- Location: Lake County
- Length: 0.154 mi (248 m)

State Road 463, known as Cypress Mill Access Road, is a north-south 0.154 miles (0.248 km) road connecting SR 46 on the south end to the former alignment of SR 46 (Cypress Mill Road) at the north. It runs parallel east of SR 461.

=== State Road 465 ===
State Road 465
- Location: Lake County
- Length: 0.071 mi (114 m)

State Road 465, known locally as Tree Frog Lane, is a north-south 0.071 miles (0.114 km) long road running from SR 46 north to an intersection where Sleepy Bear Lane continues to the east.

=== State Road 466 ===
State Road 466
- Location: Lake County
- Length: 0.241 mi (388 m)

State Road 466, known locally as Bronson Road, is an east-west 0.241 miles (0.388 km) long road running from Wekiva River Road eastward until it dead ends. It runs parallel to the south of SR 46.

=== State Road 467 ===
State Road 467
- Location: Lake County
- Length: 0.092 mi (148 m)

State Road 467, part of Deerwood Farms Road, is a north-south 0.092 miles (0.148 km) road. It starts on the south end at the former alignment of SR 46, and heads north underneath the Wekiva Parkway, ending at SR 46.

=== State Road 469 ===
State Road 469
- Location: Lake County
- Length: 0.071 mi (114 m)

State Road 469, known as Bear Pond Access Road, is a north-south 0.071 miles (0.114 km) road. It starts at SR 46 and runs north to the former alignment of SR 46 on Bear Pond Drive.

== Pictures ==
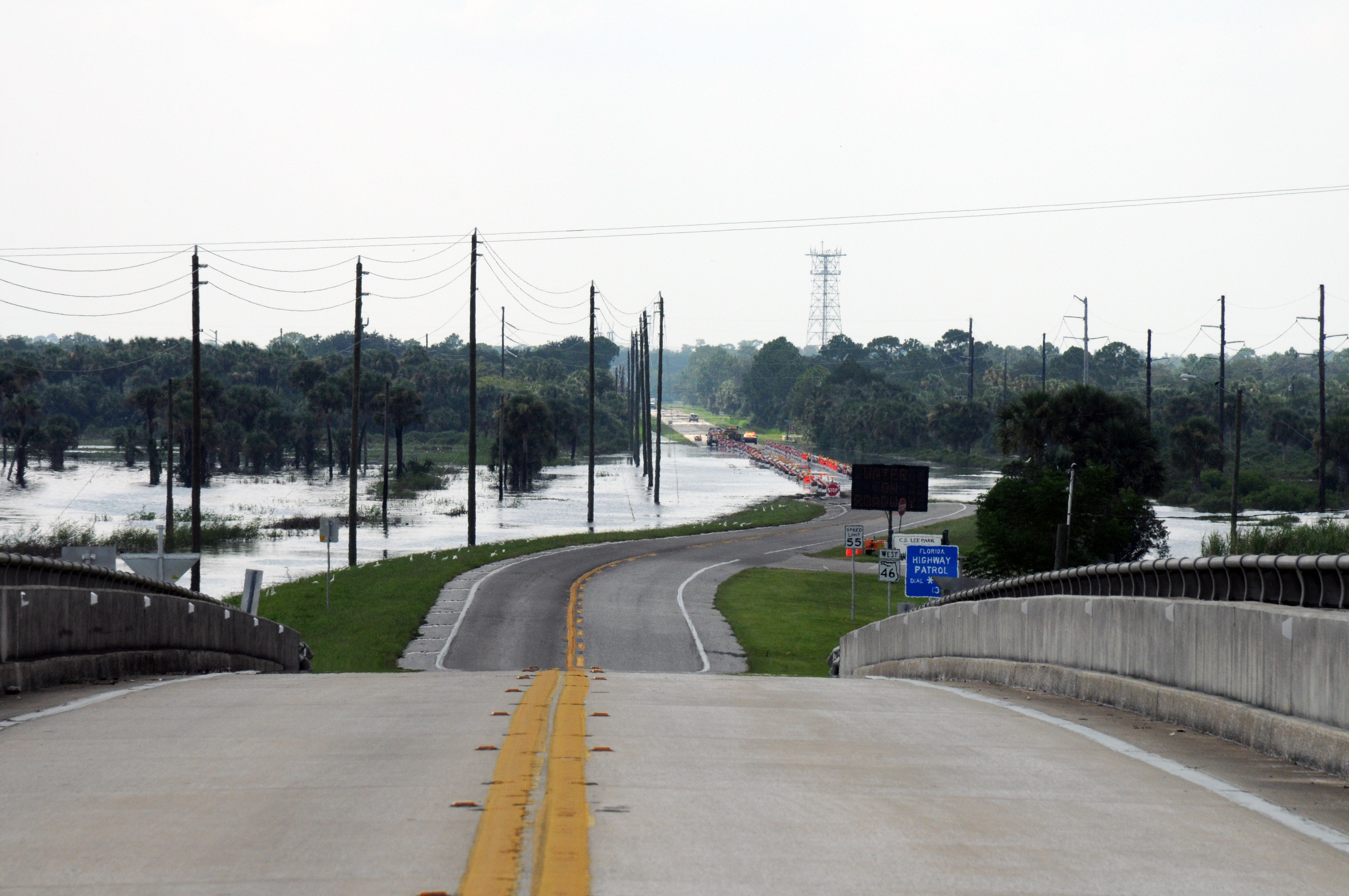
State Road 46 underwater due to Tropical Storm Fay
