= Lower Wekiva River Preserve State Park =

State park in Florida, United States

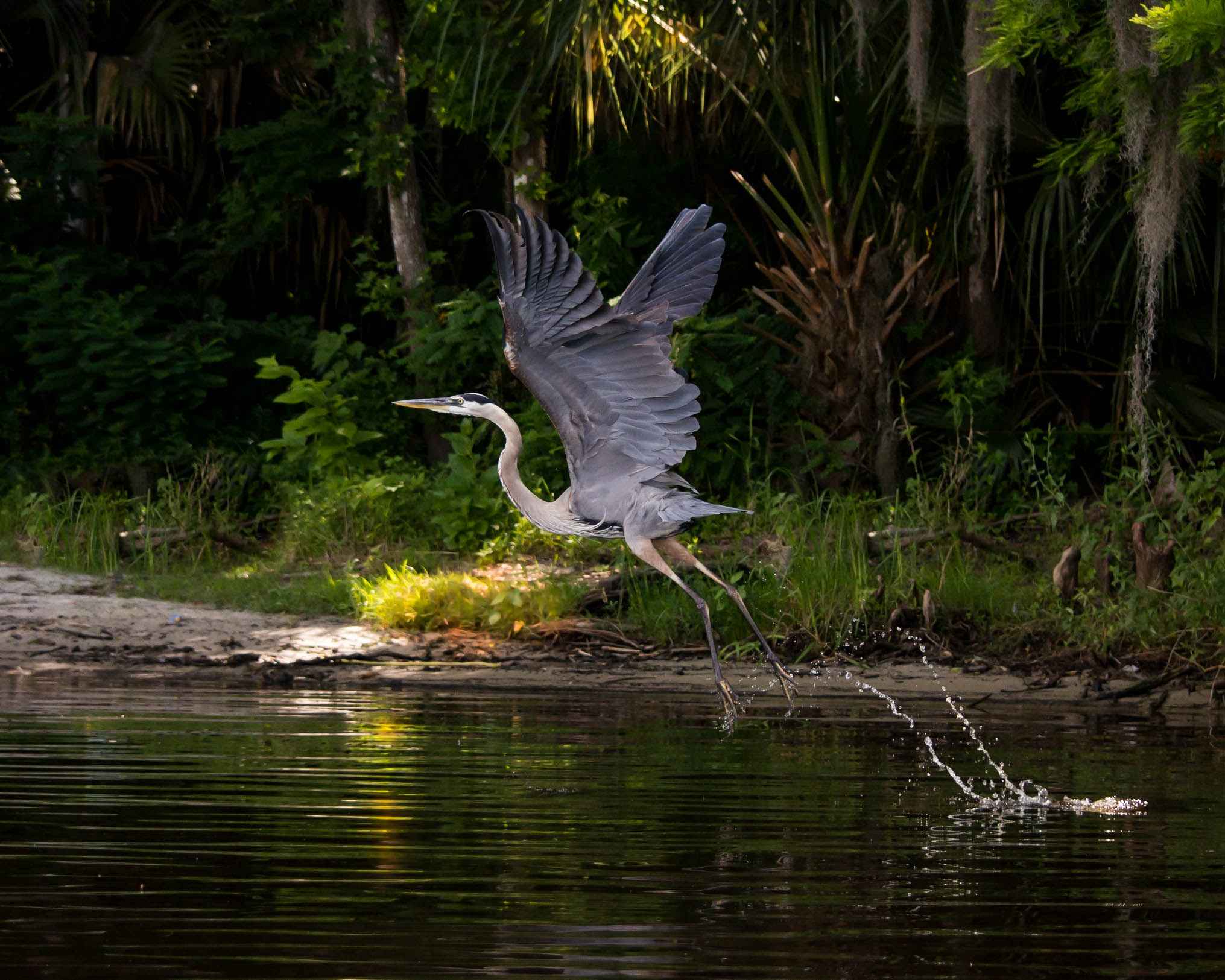
- A great blue heron takes flight from the Lower Wekiva River

- Location within Florida Location within the United States
- Interactive map of Lower Wekiva River Preserve State Park
- Location: Lake and Seminole counties, Florida, United States
- Nearest city: Sanford, Florida
- Coordinates: 28°52′01″N 81°22′05″W
- Area: 18,000 acres (7,300 ha)
- Governing body: Florida Department of Environmental Protection

Lower Wekiva River Preserve State Park is an 18,000-acre (7,300 ha) Florida State Park located on six miles (9.7 km) of the St. Johns River in Lake and Seminole counties. The park forms a wildlife corridor to the Ocala National Forest along the Wekiva and St. Johns Rivers.

== Fauna ==
Among the wildlife of the park are black bears, river otters, alligators, wood storks, and sandhill cranes.

== The park ==
There are two sections to the park, north and south. The northern section's entrance is in Pine Lakes, off S.R. 44. This entrance leads to the multiuse trails, primitive horse camping and backpack camping areas. The entrance to the southern section, off S.R. 46 nine miles (14 km) west of Sanford, provides access to 5,000 acres (2,000 hectares) of the park. There is no horseback riding in this part of the park.

Neither section provides water access. Although canoeists can travel the Wekiva River through the park, they must launch from outside.

== Recreational activities ==
Activities include equestrian camping, biking, canoeing, hiking, and wildlife viewing. Amenities include horse stalls and corrals and 18 miles (29 km) of multiuse trails.

== Hours ==
Florida state parks are open between 8 a.m. and sundown every day of the year (including holidays).

== Gallery ==
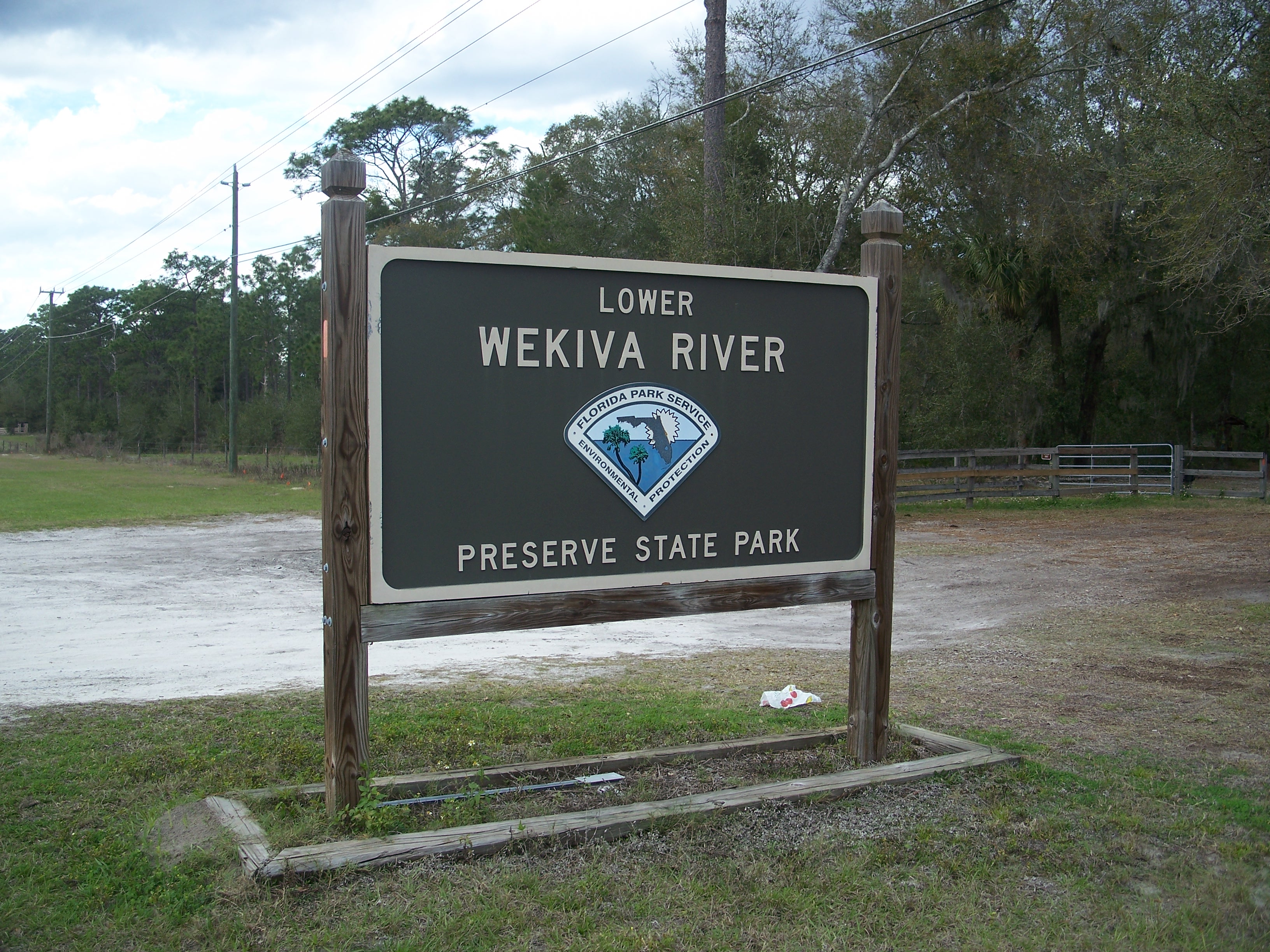
Park sign on SR 46

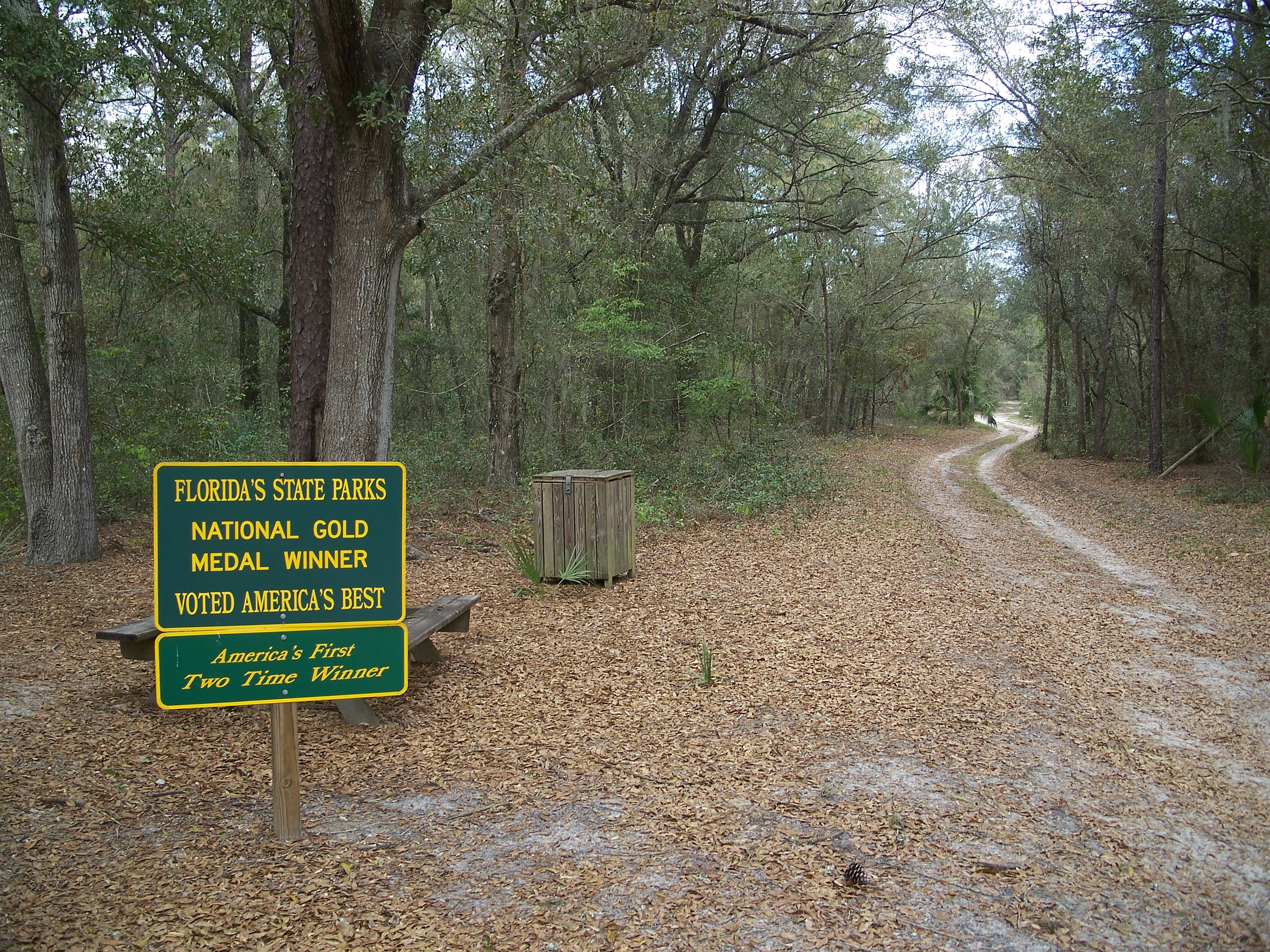
Path into the park, off SR 46

== References and external links ==
- Lower Wekiva River Preserve State Park at Florida State Parks
- Lower Wekiva River State Preserve at State Parks
- Lower Wekiva River State Preserve at Absolutely Florida
- Lower Wekiva River State Preserve at Wildernet
