= Taintsville, Florida =

Taintsville
- Unincorporated community
- Location within Seminole County, Florida
- Coordinates: 28°38′48″N 81°08′12″W
- Country: United States
- State: Florida
- County: Seminole

Population
  - Estimate: 80
- Time zone: UTC-5 (Eastern (EST))
  - Summer (DST): UTC-4 (EDT)
- Area codes: 407, 689 & 321

Taintsville is an unincorporated community in Seminole County, Florida, United States, located between Oviedo and Chuluota. On December 14, 1971, it was formally designated as the Village of Taintsville by Seminole County. The population is about 80 people.

The community's name was derived by residents saying "t ain't" Oviedo and "t ain't" Chuluota.
