= Florida State Road 419 =

State highway in Florida, United States

State Road 419 and County Road 419
- SR 419 in red, CR 419 in blue

Route information
- Maintained by FDOT
- Length: 9.330 mi (15.015 km)
- Existed: 1945 renumbering (definition)–present

Major junctions
- South end: SR 426 / SR 434 / CR 419 in Oviedo
- North end: US 17 / US 92 in Winter Springs

Location
- Country: United States
- State: Florida
- County: Seminole

Highway system
- Florida State Highway System; Interstate; US; State; Former; Pre‑1945; Toll; Scenic
← SR 417	→ SR 421

State Road 419 (SR 419) is a state highway in Seminole County, in Central Florida, United States.

== History ==
SR 203 was defined without a number by 1931 state law, chapter 14921, approved May 29, 1931:

That certain road beginning at a point on State Road 3, approximately three miles south of the City of Sanford, where the present paved road to Oviedo intersects said SR 3; thence along said paved road to the intersection of Broadway and Bay Streets in the Town of Oviedo, Florida; and thence running in a southeasterly direction along the paved road, as now located, and known as the Chuluota-Oviedo Road, to Chuluota, Florida; thence continuing south along the Section line between Sections 28, 29 and 32 and 33, Township 21, Range 32, in the County of Seminole to its intersection with the Orange County line; and thence continuing on the present paved road to the intersection of said road with State Road 22.

In the 1945 renumbering, SR 203 became State Road 419.

== Major intersections ==
The entire route is in Seminole County.

Location	mi	km	Destinations	Notes
Oviedo	0.000	0.000	SR 426 west / CR 419 south (Broadway Street / CR 426 east) SR 434 east (Central Avenue)	south end of SR 434 overlap
Oviedo	0.250	0.402	To CR 419 / Franklin Street	
Winter Springs	2.485	3.999	SR 417 – Sanford, Orlando	
Winter Springs	6.787	10.923	SR 434 west	north end of SR 434 overlap
Winter Springs	9.330	15.015	US 17 / US 92 (SR 15 / SR 600)	
1.000 mi = 1.609 km; 1.000 km = 0.621 mi: Concurrency terminus
