= Florida State Road 424 =

State highway in Florida, United States

State Road 424 and County Road 424
- County Road 424
- SR 424 in red, CR 424 in blue

Route information
- Length: 9.672 mi (15.566 km) 2.572 miles (4.139 km) as SR 424

Major junctions
- North end: SR 434 in Lockhart
- SR 423 in Orlando SR 426 in Fairview Shores
- South end: West Par Street in Orlando

Location
- Country: United States
- State: Florida
- County: Orange

Highway system
- Florida State Highway System; Interstate; US; State; Former; Pre‑1945; Toll; Scenic
← SR 423	→ SR 426

State Road 424 (FL 424) is a 2.572-mile-long (4.139 km) state highway in Orange County, Florida, that runs from State Road 434 and County Road 424 on the Orlando-Lockhart city line to West Par Street and Edgewood Drive in northern Orlando.

The road's historic terminus is an intersection with Plymouth Sorrento Road in Plymouth. The road has since been downgraded to a county road and bisected by State Road 414, the Apopka Expressway. The current designation of County Road 424 (CR 424) begins at U.S. Route 441 in Apopka, is briefly interrupted by SR 414, and continues east to meet SR 424 and SR 434 on the Orlando city line.

== Major intersections ==
The entire route is in Orange County.

Location	mi	km	Destinations	Notes
Apopka	0.0	0.0	US 441 (Main Street)	Road is unsigned SR 500; no northbound left turn
Gap in route, connection made via US 441 and Brownell Street
Orlando–Lockhart line	7.1 0.000	11.4 0.000	SR 434 (Forest City Road / John Young Parkway)	Transition from CR 424 to SR 424
Fairview Shores	0.660	1.062	SR 423 (Lee Road)	
Fairview Shores	1.395	2.245	SR 426 east (West Fairbanks Avenue)	Western terminus of SR 426
Orlando	2.572	4.139	West Par Street / Edgewater Drive south	Continues south without designation
1.000 mi = 1.609 km; 1.000 km = 0.621 mi: Concurrency terminus; Incomplete access

== Major intersections ==
The entire route is in Orange County.

Location	mi	km	Destinations	Notes
Apopka	0.0	0.0	US 441 (Main Street)	Road is unsigned SR 500; no northbound left turn
Gap in route, connection made via US 441 and Brownell Street
Orlando–Lockhart line	7.1 0.000	11.4 0.000	SR 434 (Forest City Road / John Young Parkway)	Transition from CR 424 to SR 424
Fairview Shores	0.660	1.062	SR 423 (Lee Road)	
Fairview Shores	1.395	2.245	SR 426 east (West Fairbanks Avenue)	Western terminus of SR 426
Orlando	2.572	4.139	West Par Street / Edgewater Drive south	Continues south without designation
1.000 mi = 1.609 km; 1.000 km = 0.621 mi: Concurrency terminus; Incomplete access
