= Slavia, Florida =

Slavia
- Unincorporated community
- Location within Seminole County, Florida
- Coordinates: 28°38′53″N 81°13′49″W
- Country: United States
- State: Florida
- County: Seminole
- Elevation: 39 ft (12 m)
- Time zone: UTC-5 (Eastern (EST))
  - Summer (DST): UTC-4 (EDT)
- Area codes: 407, 689 & 321
- GNIS feature ID: 291223

Slavia is an unincorporated community in Seminole County, Florida, United States. Slavia is located along State Road 426 near the southwest border of Oviedo.

== History ==
In 1911, Lutheran Slovaks originally from what at the time was the Austro-Hungarian Empire (now Slovakia) who were living in Cleveland, Ohio formed the Slavia Colony Company with the goal of establishing a colony in Florida.
