= Heathrow, Florida =

- Location in Seminole County and the state of Florida
- Coordinates: 28°46′31″N 81°22′19″W
- Country: United States
- State: Florida
- County: Seminole
- Founded: 1985; 41 years ago
- Founder: Jeno Paulucci

Area
  - Total: 3.16 sq mi (8.18 km^{2})
  - Land: 2.75 sq mi (7.11 km^{2})
  - Water: 0.41 sq mi (1.07 km^{2})
- Elevation: 43 ft (13 m)

Population (2020)
  - Total: 6,806
  - Density: 2,480.8/sq mi (957.86/km^{2})
- Time zone: UTC-5 (Eastern (EST))
  - Summer (DST): UTC-4 (EDT)
- ZIP code: 32746
- Area codes: 407, 689
- FIPS code: 12-29320
- GNIS feature ID: 2402574

Heathrow is a census-designated place and an unincorporated suburban community in Seminole County, Florida, United States. Heathrow is on the I-4 Corridor in Central Florida, 19 miles northeast of Orlando and 38 miles southwest of Daytona Beach.

Heathrow comprises a master-planned, private, gated residential community of approximately 2,200 homes, which is also called Heathrow, and the Heathrow International Business Center, an office park. Heathrow was founded in 1985 by Jeno Paulucci, a food business entrepreneur. The area had been a source of celery used in making his Chun King Foods American Chinese style food. As of the 2020 census, Heathrow had a population of 6,806. Heathrow is home to the national headquarters of the American Automobile Association (AAA).

Heathrow is part of the Orlando–Kissimmee–Sanford Metropolitan Statistical Area.

== Geography and transportation ==
According to the United States Census Bureau, the CDP has a total area of 3.3 square miles (8.5 km^{2}), of which 2.8 square miles (7.3 km^{2}) is land and 0.5 square miles (1.3 km^{2}) (16.01%) is water.

The main highway serving Heathrow is Interstate 4, which traverses the state from Daytona Beach in the east to Tampa in the west. County Road 46A, which is a spur of State Road 46, also passes here. International Parkway (not to be confused with Orlando's International Drive) also gives access to both SR 417 and SR 429. Until 2024, the two expressways were non-continuous. SR 429 is now extended via Wekiva Parkway to meet SR 417 in the Sanford/Heathrow area. It is exit 55B on both roads as SR 429 picks up its numbering from SR 417.

== Demographics ==
Historical population
Census	Pop.	Note	%±
2020	6,806		—
U.S. Decennial Census

=== 2020 census ===
As of the 2020 census, Heathrow had a population of 6,806. The median age was 44.3 years. 22.5% of residents were under the age of 18 and 19.9% of residents were 65 years of age or older. For every 100 females there were 94.9 males, and for every 100 females age 18 and over there were 91.3 males age 18 and over.

100.0% of residents lived in urban areas, while 0.0% lived in rural areas.

There were 2,729 households in Heathrow, of which 32.2% had children under the age of 18 living in them. Of all households, 62.5% were married-couple households, 12.4% were households with a male householder and no spouse or partner present, and 21.1% were households with a female householder and no spouse or partner present. About 23.1% of all households were made up of individuals and 8.5% had someone living alone who was 65 years of age or older.

There were 2,911 housing units, of which 6.3% were vacant. The homeowner vacancy rate was 1.4% and the rental vacancy rate was 6.8%.

Racial composition as of the 2020 census
Race	Number	Percent
White	4,372	64.2%
Black or African American	347	5.1%
American Indian and Alaska Native	16	0.2%
Asian	1,127	16.6%
Native Hawaiian and Other Pacific Islander	1	0.0%
Some other race	215	3.2%
Two or more races	728	10.7%
Hispanic or Latino (of any race)	817	12.0%

=== 2000 census ===
As of the 2000 census, there were 4,068 people, 1,770 households, and 1,258 families residing in the CDP. The population density was 1,466.6 inhabitants per square mile (566.3/km^{2}). There were 1,961 housing units at an average density of 707.0 units per square mile (273.0 units/km^{2}). The racial makeup of the CDP was 89.33% White, 3.69% African American, 0.12% Native American, 4.70% Asian, 0.98% from other races, and 1.18% from two or more races. Hispanic or Latino of any race were 6.12% of the population.

There were 1,770 households, out of which 25.1% had children under the age of 18 living with them, 64.9% were married couples living together, 4.2% had a female householder with no husband present, and 28.9% were non-families. 23.5% of all households were made up of individuals, and 4.8% had someone living alone who was 65 years of age or older. The average household size was 2.30 and the average family size was 2.72.

In the CDP, the population was spread out, with 19.9% under the age of 18, 3.7% from 18 to 24, 32.5% from 25 to 44, 31.8% from 45 to 64, and 12.1% who were 65 years of age or older. The median age was 41 years. For every 100 females, there were 95.8 males. For every 100 females age 18 and over, there were 93.0 males.

The median income for a household in the CDP was $84,241, and the median income for a family was $107,479. Males had a median income of $76,790 versus $41,820 for females. The per capita income for the CDP was $59,905. About 1.4% of families and 2.1% of the population were below the poverty line, including none of those under age 18 and 6.0% of those age 65 or over.

== Residential community ==
The Heathrow is a city residential community consists of 2061 homes in 30 different sub-developments. All of these sub-developments are part of the Heathrow Master Association. Each sub-development is also incorporated as part of its own Home Owner's Association, or is part of an association that includes more than one sub-development.

The following neighborhoods are part of the Heathrow residential community.

- Brampton Cove
- Bridgewater Neighborhood
  - East Camden
  - Bristol Park
  - Chestnut Hill
- Clubside
- Devon Green
- The Hamptons
- Heathrow Lakes Maintenance Association
  - Brookhaven Manor & Ridge
  - Burlington Oaks
  - Carrington Park
  - Cherry Ridge
  - Coventry
  - Heron Ridge
  - Keenwicke
  - Kentford Gardens
  - Lakeside
  - Reserve At Heathrow
  - Waters Edge
  - Wembley Park
  - Wyntree
- Muirfield Village
  - Muirfield Village
  - Breckenridge Heights
  - Lexington Green
- Regency Green
  - Regency Green
  - Stratford Gardens
- Racquet Club Villas
- Stonebridge
- Turnberry
- Westover (Bridgewater Club)
- Willowbrook

== Notable people ==
- Lee Corso, ESPN personality
- Chris DiMarco, professional golfer
- Dwight Howard, professional basketball player
- Cliff Kresge, professional golfer
- Tim Raines, baseball player
- Tim Raines Jr., baseball player
- Curly Neal, professional basketball player

== Economy ==
Heathrow is the national headquarters of the American Automobile Association (AAA).
