= CareerSource Central Florida =

CareerSource Central Florida (CSCF) is Central Florida region’s workforce board, responsible for workforce planning, programs, and the labor market for five Florida counties (Lake, Orange, Osceola, Seminole and Sumter) in the United States.

== Services for the unemployed ==
CareerSource Central Florida provides employment and training to local job seekers throughout offices in Orange, Osceola, Lake, Seminole and Sumter Counties. Services include:

- Job leads, placement services, resume writing assistance, career planning and counseling, training opportunities; information on filing for unemployment, veterans programs, information on community resources and agencies and brochures on how to find (and keep) a job and related topics
- An online job bank
- Job fairs, including virtual and in-office events with area employers
- Scholarships for training, available to those who qualify when receiving public assistance or after a layoff
- Resource Rooms, with no-cost access to employment resources; these include a fax machine, a copier, telephones, computers, printers, internet access, basic Microsoft Office software, an online resume-building tool, typing software, choice assessment (a career-interest checklist), job salary comparisons, information on growing industries in Central Florida, self-paced tutorials and training in programs such as Windows, Word, Excel, PowerPoint and Outlook.

== Services for employers ==
CareerSource Central Florida also provides no-cost recruitment, retention and training for employers, including:

- Training award programs which may pay for up 50% of a company’s direct training costs (up to $100,000)
- An online job bank, where employers can post job openings and reach job-seekers across the state
- Job fairs throughout the community, online and in CareerSource Central Florida offices
- A mobile unit, a transportable HR resource for pre-employment screening, testing, training or interviewing
- A lending Library, where employers can access training and human-resources materials
- Research and labor-market information which companies may use to make business decisions (such as current occupational wages, the available labor force and salary comparisons)

== Awards ==
CareerSource North Central Florida received a $10000 prize for its work on the Green Job Pipeline Advisor Council.
