= Florida State Road 436 =

Highway in Florida

State Road 436
- Semoran Boulevard; East Altamonte Drive

Route information
- Maintained by FDOT
- Length: 25.532 mi (41.090 km)
- Existed: 1945–present

Major junctions
- South end: SR 528 / Orlando International Airport in Orlando
- SR 408 in Orlando; US 17 / US 92 in Casselberry; I-4 in Altamonte Springs
- West end: US 441 in Apopka

Location
- Country: United States
- State: Florida
- Counties: Orange, Seminole

Highway system
- Florida State Highway System; Interstate; US; State; Former; Pre‑1945; Toll; Scenic
← SR 435	→ SR 437

State Road 436 (SR 436), known as Semoran Boulevard for most of its length and Altamonte Drive in Altamonte Springs, is a north-south road (east-west after US 17/92) in the Orlando area running from US 441 in Apopka to the Beachline Expressway near Orlando International Airport. Constructed in the late 1960s, the road passes through Seminole County, Florida and Orange County, Florida. Because of this, the common name for SR 436 is a portmanteau of the names of the two counties: "Sem" and "oran", hence "Semoran Boulevard." The common pronunciation of "Semoran" resembles that term of Cimarron.

== Route description ==
SR 436 is signed north-south south of Seminole County, while west of the county, it is signed east-west. The road without the state road number starts at SR 417. Then starting at the intersection with SR 528 at the Orlando International Airport, SR 436 runs north and intersects with SR 15 and SR 552. It then intersects Florida State Road 408 and then intersects with SR 50. Florida 436 then turns to the west after the interchange with US 17 and US 92 (U.S.17-92). This intersection was considered to be one of the deadliest intersections in the nation with an average of three traffic accidents per day. Heading west, the road enters Altamonte Springs, Florida and has an interchange with I-4 at exit 92. It then intersects SR 434 still heading west. The road then has intersections at Wekiva Springs Road and Sheeler Avenue before ending at US 441.

Lynx bus route 436N buses are used along this route from the Apopka Superstop off of US 441 in Apopka to the Fern Park Superstop in Fern Park. Lynx bus route 436S buses are used along this route from the Fern Park Superstop to the Orlando International Airport. Both routes were named for the state road.

== History ==
Construction began in October 2011 on a $24.5 million project to build a flyover ramp from eastbound SR 436 to Red Bug Lake Road in Casselberry in order to reduce congestion from motorists having to wait at a traffic light to turn onto Red Bug Lake Road. On February 1, 2014, the flyover ramp from eastbound SR 436 to Red Bug Lake Road opened to traffic. In late 2013, the Florida Department of Transportation began an $80 million project to construct a flyover interchange with US 17-92 traveling over SR 436 in Casselberry. This interchange was built to alleviate congestion at one of the busiest intersections in Florida. The flyover interchange was completed on April 6, 2015, with a ribbon-cutting ceremony held.

== Major intersections ==
County	Location	mi	km	Destinations	Notes
Orange	Apopka	0.000	0.000	US 441	Interchange; access to US 441 south via local roads; road is unsigned SR 500
Seminole	Altamonte Springs	4.939	7.949	SR 434	
Seminole	Altamonte Springs	6.85	11.02	I-4 – Orlando, Daytona Beach	Exit 92 on I-4 (SR 400)
Seminole	Altamonte Springs	8.268	13.306	CR 427 south (Maitland Avenue)	Western terminus of CR 427 concurrency
Seminole	Altamonte Springs	8.746	14.075	CR 427 north (Ronald Reagan Boulevard)	Eastern terminus of CR 427 concurrency
Seminole	Casselberry	9.799	15.770	US 17 / US 92 – Orlando, Sanford	Interchange; road is unsigned SR 15 / SR 600
Seminole	Casselberry	11.291	18.171	Red Bug Lake Road east	Intersection with eastbound flyover ramp
Orange		14.349	23.092	SR 426 (Aloma Avenue) – Winter Park, Goldenrod	
Orange		17.66	28.42	SR 50 (Colonial Drive)	Interchange
Orange	Orlando	18.87	30.37	SR 408 west – Downtown Orlando	Exit 14 on SR 408 (East-West Expressway)
Orange	Orlando	18.906	30.426	Lake Underhill Road (CR 526) to SR 408 east – Titusville	
Orange	Orlando	19.978	32.151	SR 552 (Curry Ford Road)	
Orange	Orlando	22.939	36.917	SR 15 (Hoffner Avenue)	
Orange	Orlando	24.987	40.213	SR 528 – Cocoa, Tampa	Turbine interchange; Exit 11 on SR 528 (Beachline Expressway)
Orange	Orlando	25.532	41.090	Orlando International Airport	Continues south as Jeff Fuqua Drive
Orange	Orlando	1.000 mi = 1.609 km; 1.000 km = 0.621 mi: Concurrency terminus; Tolled			
