= Florida State Road 426 =

State highway in Florida, United States

State Road 426 and County Road 426
- County Road 426
- SR 426 in red, CR 426 in blue

Route information
- Maintained by FDOT
- Length: 14.532 mi (23.387 km)
- Existed: 1945 renumbering (definition)–present

Major junctions
- West end: SR 424 in Fairview Shores
- I-4 in Winter Park; US 17 / US 92 in Winter Park; SR 436 in Winter Park; SR 551 in Goldenrod; SR 417 in Bertha; SR 419 / SR 434 in Oviedo
- East end: SR 46 in Geneva

Location
- Country: United States
- State: Florida
- County: Seminole

Highway system
- Florida State Highway System; Interstate; US; State; Former; Pre‑1945; Toll; Scenic
← SR 424	→ SR 429

State Road 426 (SR 426) is a major road in Orange and Seminole counties, entirely north of Orlando. Eastwards, the road continues as County Road 426 (CR 426) as a direct route to Mims and Scottsmoor, the census-designated places of Brevard County, terminating at SR 46.

SR 426 is signed east–west, but takes a diagonal path through the Orlando-Kissimmee, Florida, Metropolitan Statistical Area and rural Seminole County, by the Econlockhatchee River.

This also marks the start of the Cady Way Trail and the end of the Cross Seminole Trail.

== Route description ==
SR 426 starts at SR 424 as Fairbanks Avenue in Fairview Shores, and starts off as an undivided, 4 lane road. Shortly, it parallels Interstate 4 (I-4) for 0.2 miles (0.32 km). In an instant, I-4 forms a diamond interchange. Notice that Interstate 4 is running northwest–southeast. SR 426 leaves unincorporated Orange County and into Winter Park. At the corner of SR 426 and Denning Drive, a sinkhole comes in sight, however, it was turned into a man-made lake. SR 527 merges on Fairbanks Avenue as the northern terminus of SR 527, which leads to Kissimmee. It crosses 2 railroad tracks after the merge. SR 426 enters Historical Downtown Winter Park and changes names from Fairbanks Avenue to Aloma Avenue. SR 426 exits Winter Park and intersects SR 436 where it becomes a divided highway. Briefly passing through Goldenrod and the beginning of SR 551 it finally enters Seminole County and heads NNE. After the interchange of SR 417 it parallels that toll road for several miles. Just after Red Bug Lake Road, SR 426 turns into a 2+1 road. Entering Downtown Oviedo, SR 426 is two lanes wide, and intersects SR 434/SR 419. SR 426 forks off Broadway Street and becomes Geneva Road. SR 426 becomes County Road 426. Now leaving the Orlando-Kissimmee, Florida, Metropolitan Statistical Area and the City of Oviedo, it runs along the Econlockhatchee River for a short time. Entering Geneva, CR 426 ends at SR 46. Turning left leads to Sanford. Turning right leads to Mims and Scottsmoor.

== History ==
SR 202 was defined without a number by 1931 state law, chapter 14920, approved May 29, 1931: "That certain road beginning at the southwest corner of the southeast quarter of section 28, township 20, range 32, in Seminole County, Florida, where it intersects with State Road number 44, and running in a southwesterly direction along the paved road as now located and known as the Oviedo-Geneva Road to the intersection of Broadway and Bay Streets in Oviedo, Florida; and thence running west approximately five-eighths of a mile, thence in a southwesterly direction along the present paved road as now located and now known as the Oviedo-Winter Park Road, to its intersection with the Orange County line at the southwest corner of the southeast quarter of the southeast quarter of section 35, township 21, range 30, in the County of Seminole and State of Florida; thence continuing and following the present paved road to the point where said road intersects with the city limits of the Town of Winter Park, Florida."

In modern-day terms, this road is CR 426 and SR 426 from Old Mims Road south of Geneva to just east of Lakemont Avenue in Winter Park, with a few realignments in Oviedo.

SR 202 was extended west without a number in 1935 state law chapter 17306, filed May 29, 1935: "A certain road described as an extension of State Road No. 202, beginning at the East City limits of Winter Park, in Orange County, through Winter Park and on Fairbanks Avenue to the old Apopka Brick Road, thence northwesterly crossing the Seaboard Air Line Railroad, turning left and intersecting State Road No. 2, thence Westerly through Clarcona intersecting Apopka-Ocoee Road one-quarter mile South of Atlantic Coast Line Railroad."

This road is now known as SR 426 (with a slight change in downtown Winter Park), SR 424, CR 424, and Clarcona-Ocoee Road, ending at CR 437 (which was added to the State Road system as an extension of SR 24 in 1935).

In the 1945 renumbering, SR 202 east of Orange Avenue (then SR 3A, now SR 527) became part of SR 426. The rest was not given a number; parts later became SR 424A (now SR 426) and SR 424.

== Major intersections ==
County	Location	mi	km	Destinations	Notes
Orange	Fairview Shores	0.000	0.000	SR 424 (Edgewater Drive)	Western terminus of SR 426
Orange	Winter Park	1.09	1.75	I-4	Exit 87 on I-4 (SR 400)
Orange	Winter Park	2.131	3.430	US 17 / US 92 (Orlando Avenue)	Road is unsigned SR 15 / SR 600
Orange	Winter Park	2.673	4.302	Orange Avenue	Former northern terminus of SR 527
Orange	Aloma	5.942	9.563	SR 436 (Semoran Boulevard) – Casselberry, Orlando	
Orange	Goldenrod	7.128	11.471	SR 551 south (Palmetto Avenue) – Narcoossee, St. Cloud	Northern terminus of SR 551
Seminole		7.766	12.498	CR 426A south (Hall Road) / Howell Branch Road	Northern terminus of CR 426A
Seminole		9.14	14.71	SR 417 – Orlando, Sanford	Exit 38 on SR 417 (Central Florida GreeneWay)
Seminole		9.741	15.677	Dean Road (CR 425 south)	Northern terminus of CR 425
Seminole	Oviedo	14.532 0.0	23.387 0.0	SR 419 north / SR 434 (Central Avenue) / CR 419 south – Sanford, UCF	Transition from SR 426 to CR 426; termini of SR 419 and CR 419
Seminole	Geneva	7.9	12.7	SR 46 – Sanford, Mims	Eastern terminus of CR 426
1.000 mi = 1.609 km; 1.000 km = 0.621 mi: Tolled; Route transition
