= Southchase, Florida =

Unincorporated area in Florida, US

- Census-designated place
- Location in Orange County and the state of Florida
- Coordinates: 28°22′40″N 81°22′49″W
- Country: United States
- State: Florida
- County: Orange

Area
  - Total: 6.92 sq mi (17.92 km^{2})
  - Land: 6.92 sq mi (17.92 km^{2})
  - Water: 0 sq mi (0.00 km^{2})
- Elevation: 85 ft (26 m)

Population (2020)
  - Total: 16,276
  - Density: 2,352.1/sq mi (908.15/km^{2})
- Time zone: UTC-5 (Eastern (EST))
  - Summer (DST): UTC-4 (EDT)
- FIPS code: 12-67270
- GNIS feature ID: 2402883

Southchase is a census-designated place and an unincorporated area in Orange County, Florida, United States. The population was 16,276 at the 2020 census. It is part of the Orlando–Kissimmee–Sanford, Florida Metropolitan Statistical Area.

== Geography ==
According to the United States Census Bureau, the CDP has a total area of 6.8 square miles (17.7 km^{2}), all land.

== Demographics ==
Historical population
| Census | Pop. | Note | %± |
|---|---|---|---|
| 2020 | 16,276 | | — |
U.S. Decennial Census

=== 2020 census ===
As of the 2020 census, Southchase had a population of 16,276. The median age was 39.0 years. 22.0% of residents were under the age of 18 and 12.6% of residents were 65 years of age or older. For every 100 females there were 95.8 males, and for every 100 females age 18 and over there were 91.6 males age 18 and over.

100.0% of residents lived in urban areas, while 0.0% lived in rural areas.

There were 5,066 households in Southchase, of which 40.8% had children under the age of 18 living in them. Of all households, 56.3% were married-couple households, 14.3% were households with a male householder and no spouse or partner present, and 23.4% were households with a female householder and no spouse or partner present. About 12.7% of all households were made up of individuals and 3.9% had someone living alone who was 65 years of age or older.

There were 5,267 housing units, of which 3.8% were vacant. The homeowner vacancy rate was 0.7% and the rental vacancy rate was 4.5%.

Racial composition as of the 2020 census
| Race | Number | Percent |
|---|---|---|
| White | 4,615 | 28.4% |
| Black or African American | 2,096 | 12.9% |
| American Indian and Alaska Native | 66 | 0.4% |
| Asian | 1,712 | 10.5% |
| Native Hawaiian and Other Pacific Islander | 42 | 0.3% |
| Some other race | 3,148 | 19.3% |
| Two or more races | 4,597 | 28.2% |
| Hispanic or Latino (of any race) | 8,600 | 52.8% |

=== 2000 census ===
At the 2000 census there were 4,633 people, 1,377 households, and 1,218 families living in the CDP. The population density was 824.3/km^{2} (2,133.9/mi^{2}). There were 1,434 housing units at an average density of 255.1/km^{2} (660.5/mi^{2}). The racial makeup of the CDP was 59.27% White, 14.53% African American, 0.26% Native American, 9.15% Asian, 0.06% Pacific Islander, 11.55% from other races, and 5.18% from two or more races. Hispanic or Latino of any race were 33.82%.

Of the 1,377 households 52.1% had children under the age of 18 living with them, 75.0% were married couples living together, 9.9% had a female householder with no husband present, and 11.5% were non-families. 7.0% of households were one person and 1.4% were one person aged 65 or older. The average household size was 3.36 and the average family size was 3.52.

The age distribution was 31.8% under the age of 18, 7.2% from 18 to 24, 37.0% from 25 to 44, 19.1% from 45 to 64, and 4.9% 65 or older. The median age was 32 years. For every 100 females, there were 94.5 males. For every 100 females age 18 and over, there were 92.4 males.

The median household income was $61,707 and the median family income was $60,992. Males had a median income of $34,900 versus $28,670 for females. The per capita income for the CDP was $20,028. About 3.3% of families and 3.0% of the population were below the poverty line, including 3.1% of those under age 18 and none of those age 65 or over.
