= Lake Jesup =

Lake in the state of Florida, United States

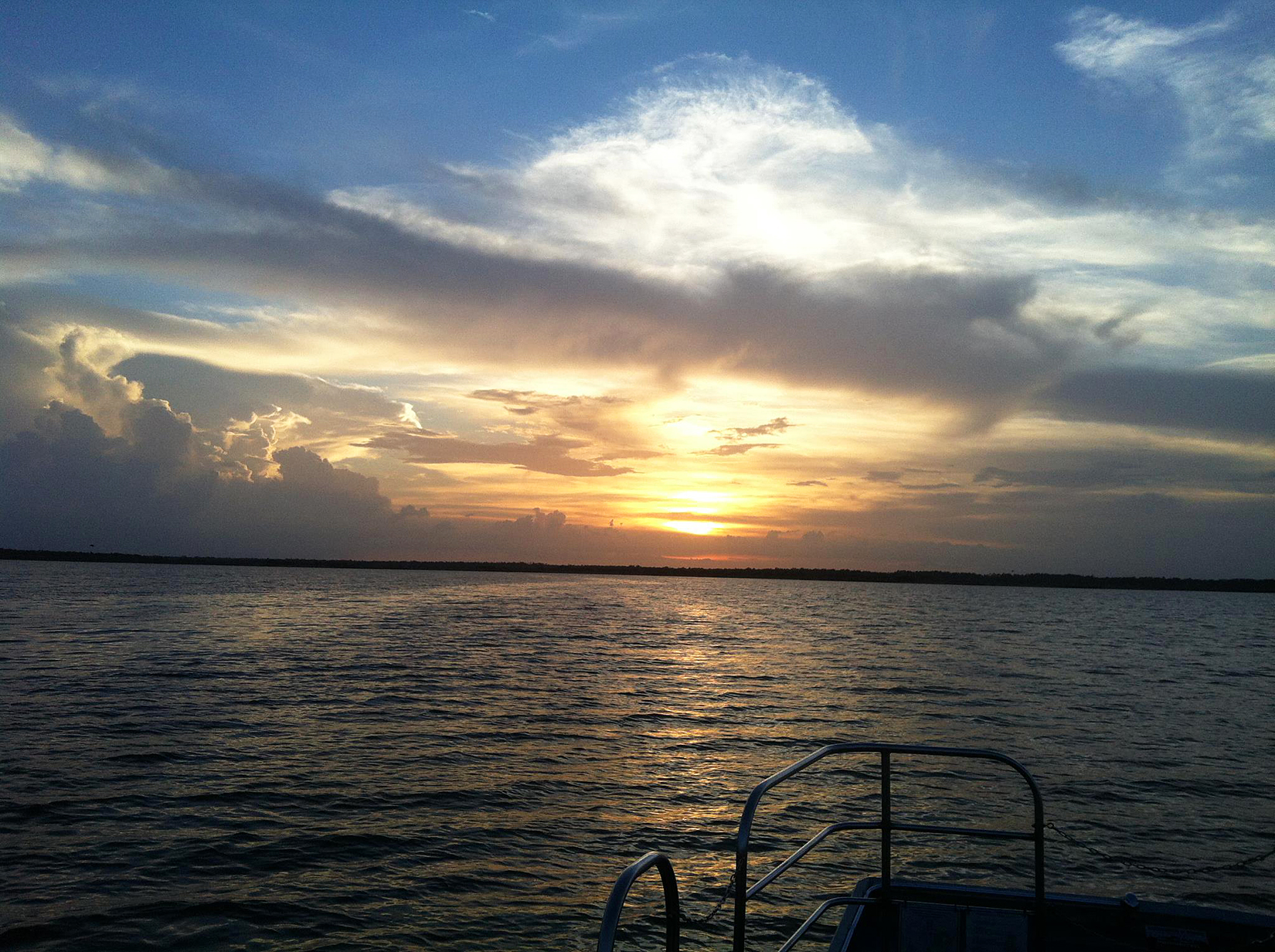
- The sunset as seen from Lake Jesup

- Location within Florida Location within the United States
- Location: Seminole County, Florida
- Coordinates: 28°43′N 81°13′W
- Primary inflows: St. Johns River
- Primary outflows: St. Johns River
- Basin countries: United States
- Max. length: 13 mi (21 km)
- Surface area: 16,000 acres (65 km^{2})
- Average depth: 6 ft (1.8 m)
- Max. depth: 10 ft (3.0 m)
- Surface elevation: 0 ft (0 m)
- Islands: (Bird Island, Hawking Island)

Lake Jesup is the largest lake in Seminole County, Florida, United States and is one of many that make up the St. Johns River. Located along the middle basin of the St. Johns, the lake encompasses an area of approximately 16,000 acres (65 km^{2}), including open water and floodplain. It is named in honor of Brigadier General Thomas Jesup, an American military officer who served in the Second Seminole War. The lake is bisected by one of the state's longest free-standing bridges, part of the Seminole County Expressway (SR 417).

The lake is home to a wide variety of species and is considered to support one of the state's densest populations of alligators. Drivers on the bridge across the lake are likely to see eagles (osprey and bald eagles) perched on the light posts watching for fish.

During the 1960s, the toll of decades of abuse and neglect was very apparent. Wastewater discharged directly into the lake, stormwater discharges from surrounding communities, the construction of berms that segregated the lake from parts of its floodplain, and a causeway that reduced the lake's connection with the St. Johns River all took their toll on the ecosystem. The discharges resulted in significant algae growth, fish kills, and a thick layer of muck more than 9½ feet deep in some areas sitting on the bottom of the lake that now averages only six feet in depth. The berm construction aggravated this problem by limiting the lake's ability to cleanse itself.

During the 1990s studies were conducted of water circulation patterns, storm-water runoff into the lake, the impacts of the State Road 417 bridge, sediments within the lake, and land management plans for adjacent public properties. With this data in hand, The Friends of Lake Jesup and the St. Johns River Water Management District staff worked closely with the Florida Department of Transportation and the Florida Fish and Wildlife Conservation Commission to develop a plan for restoring the lake.

The Friends and the District staff, working closely with the Florida Department of Transportation and the Florida Fish and Wildlife Conservation Commission, began to determine the most environmentally sound and economically feasible methods of restoring the lake.

Since that time the water district brought about 3,850 acres (15.6 km^{2}) around the lake into public ownership and has plans for acquiring an additional 4,700 acres (19 km^{2}) of floodplain around the lake as part of the restoration process and to ensure the health of the lake into the future.

In the spring of 1996 a 2-mile (3.2 km) berm on the north side of the lake was removed, reuniting 300 acres (1.2 km^{2}) of floodplain with the lake to act as a natural filter. The removal of this berm also increases the lake's flood buffering capacity as well as providing habitat to a wide variety of life.

In January 2008 the Army Corps of Engineers, the Florida Department of Transportation, and others contracted to have the State Road 46 bridge rebuilt. The re-opening of channel B and the removal of about a mile of causeway was designed to improve the flow of the St. Johns River into and out of the lake. Several other projects were also undertaken to improve the quality of the lake. The Friends of Lake Jesup was active in monitoring these projects and in bringing new areas of concern into focus. There are small businesses that operate lakeside restaurants, fish camps, and airboat tours in the vicinity of the lake.
