= Forest City, Florida =

- CDP
- Location in Seminole County and the state of Florida
- Coordinates: 28°39′43″N 81°26′40″W
- Country: United States
- State: Florida
- County: Seminole

Area
  - Total: 4.95 sq mi (12.81 km^{2})
  - Land: 4.30 sq mi (11.13 km^{2})
  - Water: 0.65 sq mi (1.68 km^{2})
- Elevation: 115 ft (35 m)

Population (2020)
  - Total: 14,623
  - Density: 3,401.8/sq mi (1,313.45/km^{2})
- Time zone: UTC-5 (Eastern (EST))
  - Summer (DST): UTC-4 (EDT)
- ZIP code: 32714, 32703
- Area codes: 407, 689
- FIPS code: 12-23375
- GNIS feature ID: 2402490

Forest City is a census-designated place and an area in Seminole County, Florida, United States. Its historic center is now in the City of Altamonte Springs. Data in this article deals only with the unincorporated section. As of the 2020 census, Forest City had a population of 14,623. It is part of the Orlando–Kissimmee Metropolitan Statistical Area.

== Geography ==
According to the United States Census Bureau, the CDP has a total area of 4.9 square miles (13 km^{2}), of which 4.3 square miles (11 km^{2}) is land and 0.6 square miles (1.6 km^{2}) (13.21%) is water.

== Demographics ==
Historical population
Census	Pop.	Note	%±
2020	14,623		—
U.S. Decennial Census

=== 2020 census ===
As of the 2020 census, Forest City had a population of 14,623. The median age was 39.8 years. 22.0% of residents were under the age of 18 and 16.5% of residents were 65 years of age or older. For every 100 females there were 96.3 males, and for every 100 females age 18 and over there were 92.8 males age 18 and over.

100.0% of residents lived in urban areas, while 0.0% lived in rural areas.

There were 5,362 households in Forest City, of which 33.7% had children under the age of 18 living in them. Of all households, 51.0% were married-couple households, 16.6% were households with a male householder and no spouse or partner present, and 25.0% were households with a female householder and no spouse or partner present. About 21.5% of all households were made up of individuals and 7.9% had someone living alone who was 65 years of age or older.

There were 5,677 housing units, of which 5.5% were vacant. The homeowner vacancy rate was 1.1% and the rental vacancy rate was 7.3%.

Racial composition as of the 2020 census
Race	Number	Percent
White	8,610	58.9%
Black or African American	1,436	9.8%
American Indian and Alaska Native	45	0.3%
Asian	702	4.8%
Native Hawaiian and Other Pacific Islander	4	0.0%
Some other race	1,168	8.0%
Two or more races	2,658	18.2%
Hispanic or Latino (of any race)	4,233	28.9%

=== 2000 census ===
As of the census of 2000, there were 12,612 people, 4,777 households, and 3,363 families residing in the CDP. The population density was 2,953.3 inhabitants per square mile (1,140.3/km^{2}). There were 4,976 housing units at an average density of 1,165.2 per square mile (449.9/km^{2}). The racial makeup of the CDP was 85.32% White, 4.86% African American, 0.25% Native American, 3.40% Asian, 0.04% Pacific Islander, 3.64% from other races, and 2.49% from two or more races. Hispanic or Latino of any race were 15.57% of the population.

There were 4,777 households, out of which 35.4% had children under the age of 18 living with them, 56.2% were married couples living together, 10.5% had a female householder with no husband present, and 29.6% were non-families. 23.7% of all households were made up of individuals, and 5.6% had someone living alone who was 65 years of age or older. The average household size was 2.62 and the average family size was 3.12.

In the CDP, the population was spread out, with 25.5% under the age of 18, 7.4% from 18 to 24, 33.3% from 25 to 44, 22.8% from 45 to 64, and 11.0% who were 65 years of age or older. The median age was 36 years. For every 100 females, there were 96.5 males. For every 100 females age 18 and over, there were 93.6 males.

The median income for a household in the CDP was $50,191, and the median income for a family was $55,109. Males had a median income of $40,669 versus $30,259 for females. The per capita income for the CDP was $24,464. About 4.2% of families and 6.0% of the population were below the poverty line, including 8.3% of those under age 18 and 9.2% of those age 65 or over.
