= Seminole County, Florida =

County in Florida, United States

- County
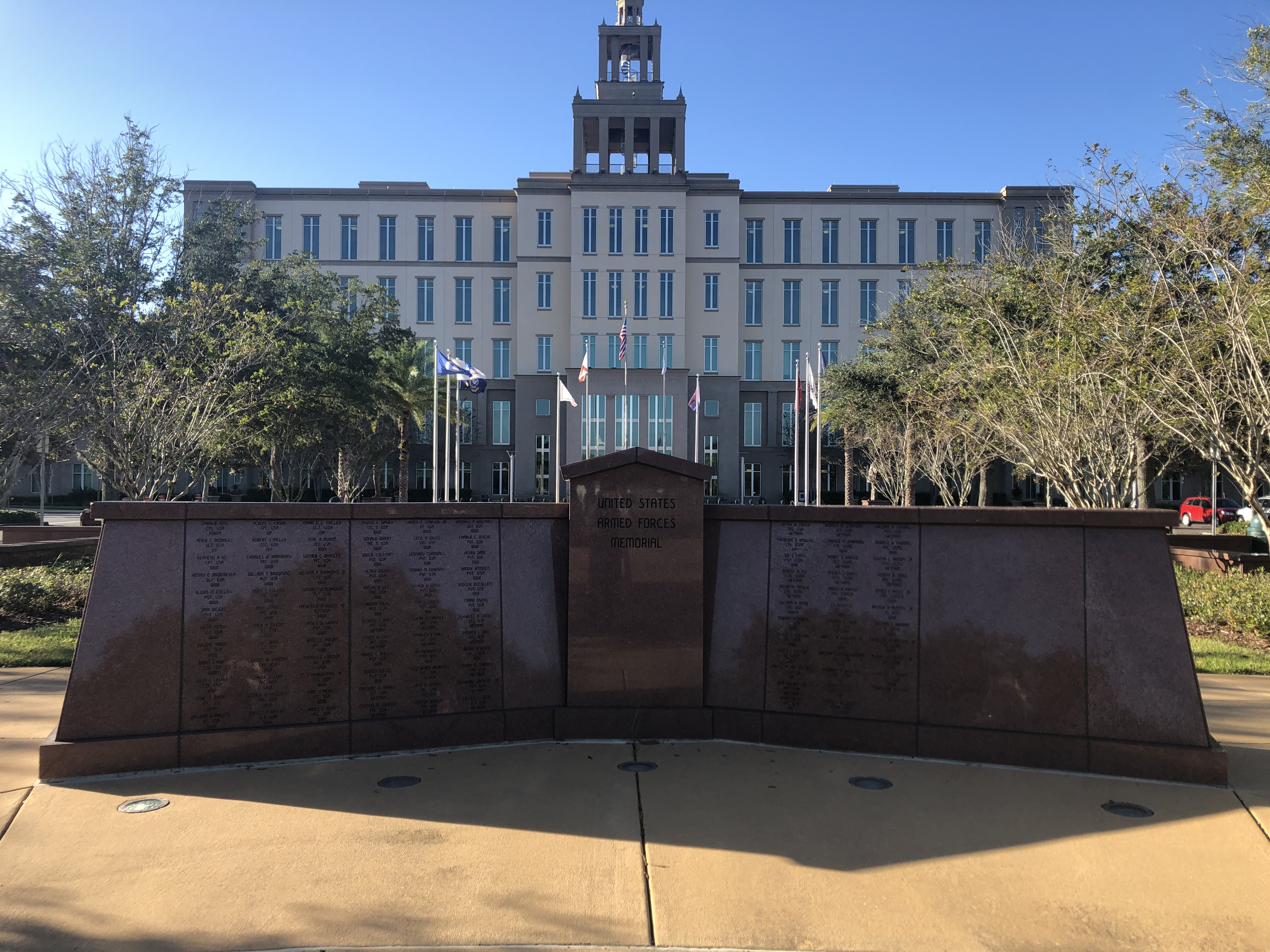
- Fallen Heroes Memorial at the Seminole County Criminal Justice Center

- Flag Seal

- Location within the U.S. state of Florida
- Coordinates: 28°43′N 81°14′W
- Country: United States
- State: Florida
- Founded: April 25, 1913
- Named for: Seminole people
- Seat: Sanford
- Largest city: Sanford

Area
  - Total: 345 sq mi (890 km^{2})
  - Land: 309 sq mi (800 km^{2})
  - Water: 36 sq mi (93 km^{2}) 10.4%

Population (2020)
  - Total: 470,856
  - Estimate (2025): 491,884 ▲
  - Density: 1,524/sq mi (588.6/km^{2})
- Time zone: UTC−5 (Eastern)
  - Summer (DST): UTC−4 (EDT)
- Congressional district: 7th
- Website: www.seminolecountyfl.gov

Seminole County (/ˈsɛmɪnoʊl/, SEM-i-nohl) is a county located in the central portion of the U.S. state of Florida. As of the 2020 census, the population was 470,856, making it the 13th-most populated county in Florida. Its county seat and largest city is Sanford. Seminole County is part of the Orlando-Kissimmee-Sanford, Florida Metropolitan Statistical Area.

== History ==
On July 21, 1821, two counties formed Florida: Escambia to the west and St. Johns to the east. In 1824, the area to the south of St. Johns County was designated Mosquito County, with its seat at Enterprise. The county's name was changed to Orange County in 1845 when Florida became a state, and over the next 70 years several other counties were created. Seminole County was one of the last to split.

Seminole County was created on April 25, 1913, out of the northern portion of Orange County by the Florida Legislature. It was named for the Seminole people who historically lived throughout the area. The name "Seminole" is thought to be derived from the Spanish word cimarron, meaning "wild" or "runaway".

== Geography ==
According to the U.S. Census Bureau, the county has an area of 345 square miles (890 km^{2}), of which 309 square miles (800 km^{2}) is land and 36 square miles (93 km^{2}) (10.4%) is water. It is Florida's fourth-smallest county by land area and third-smallest by total area.

Seminole County's location between Volusia County and Orange County has made it one of Florida's fastest-growing counties. The Greater Orlando Metropolitan District includes Seminole, Osceola, and the surrounding counties of Lake and Orange counties, together with neighboring Volusia and Brevard counties.

=== Adjacent counties ===
- Brevard County, Florida - east
- Volusia County, Florida - north and east
- Orange County, Florida - south and west
- Lake County, Florida - west

== Demographics ==
Historical population
Census	Pop.	Note	%±
1920	10,986		—
1930	18,735		70.5%
1940	22,304		19.0%
1950	26,883		20.5%
1960	54,947		104.4%
1970	83,692		52.3%
1980	179,752		114.8%
1990	287,529		60.0%
2000	365,196		27.0%
2010	422,718		15.8%
2020	470,856		11.4%
2025 (est.)	491,884	▲	4.5%
U.S. Decennial Census; 1790-1960 1900-1990; 1990-2000 2010-2019 2022

=== 2020 census ===
As of the 2020 census, the county had a population of 470,856. The median age was 39.4 years. 21.3% of residents were under the age of 18 and 16.3% of residents were 65 years of age or older. For every 100 females there were 92.9 males, and for every 100 females age 18 and over there were 90.2 males age 18 and over.

The racial makeup of the county was 61.5% White, 11.4% Black or African American, 0.3% American Indian and Alaska Native, 5.4% Asian, 0.1% Native Hawaiian and Pacific Islander, 6.6% from some other race, and 14.7% from two or more races. Hispanic or Latino residents of any race comprised 22.6% of the population.

96.8% of residents lived in urban areas, while 3.2% lived in rural areas.

There were 182,420 households in the county, of which 31.4% had children under the age of 18 living in them. Of all households, 47.6% were married-couple households, 17.0% were households with a male householder and no spouse or partner present, and 28.1% were households with a female householder and no spouse or partner present. About 24.5% of all households were made up of individuals and 9.3% had someone living alone who was 65 years of age or older.

There were 193,790 housing units, of which 5.9% were vacant. Among occupied housing units, 63.0% were owner-occupied and 37.0% were renter-occupied. The homeowner vacancy rate was 1.5% and the rental vacancy rate was 7.5%.

As of 2020, the Seminole County School District was the 12th largest school district in Florida and 60th nationally with more than 67,000 students and 10,000 employees.

=== Racial and ethnic composition ===
Seminole County, Florida – Racial and ethnic composition Note: the US Census treats Hispanic/Latino as an ethnic category. This table excludes Latinos from the racial categories and assigns them to a separate category. Hispanics/Latinos may be of any race.
Race / Ethnicity (NH = Non-Hispanic)	Pop 1980	Pop 1990	Pop 2000	Pop 2010	Pop 2020	% 1980	% 1990	% 2000	% 2010	% 2020
White alone (NH)	154,815	239,612	274,682	280,452	264,072	86.13%	83.33%	75.21%	66.34%	56.08%
Black or African American alone (NH)	17,867	23,801	33,688	44,196	50,276	9.94%	8.28%	9.22%	10.46%	10.68%
Native American or Alaska Native alone (NH)	316	754	906	995	765	0.18%	0.26%	0.25%	0.24%	0.16%
Asian alone (NH)	1,294	4,588	8,992	15,451	25,164	0.72%	1.60%	2.46%	3.66%	5.34%
Native Hawaiian or Pacific Islander alone (NH)	x	x	144	194	243	x	x	0.04%	0.05%	0.05%
Other race alone (NH)	303	168	743	1,202	2,975	0.17%	0.06%	0.20%	0.28%	0.63%
Mixed race or Multiracial (NH)	x	x	5,310	7,771	20,822	x	x	1.45%	1.84%	4.42%
Hispanic or Latino (any race)	5,157	18,606	40,731	72,457	106,539	2.87%	6.47%	11.15%	17.14%	22.63%
Total	179,752	287,529	365,196	422,718	470,856	100.00%	100.00%	100.00%	100.00%	100.00%

=== 2000 census ===
As of the census of 2000, there were 365,196 people, 139,572 households, and 97,281 families residing in the county. The population density was 1,185 inhabitants per square mile (458/km^{2}). There were 147,079 housing units at an average density of 477 per square mile (184/km^{2}). The racial makeup of the county was 82.4% White, 9.5% Black or African American, 0.3% Native American, 2.5% Asian, <0.1% Pacific Islander, 3.1% from other races, and 2.2% from two or more races. 11.2% of the population were Hispanic or Latino of any race.

There were 139,572 households, out of which 33.9% had children under the age of 18 living with them, 54.3% were married couples living together, 11.5% had a female householder with no husband present, and 30.3% were non-families. 22.9% of all households were made up of individuals, and 6.6% had someone living alone who was 65 years of age or older. The average household size was 2.59 and the average family size was 3.07. The Department of Education states that in 2003, school enrollment was approximately 72,630. As of 2006, the Seminole County School District was the 52nd largest in the nation.

Population was distributed with 25.4% under the age of 18, 8.4% from 18 to 24, 32.0% from 25 to 44, 23.6% from 45 to 64, and 10.6% who were 65 years of age or older. The median age was 36 years. For every 100 females, there were 95.90 males. For every 100 females age 18 and over, there were 92.90 males.

The median income for a household in the county was $49,326, and the median income for a family was $56,895. Males had a median income of $40,001 versus $28,217 for females. The per capita income for the county was $24,591. About 5.1% of families and 7.4% of the population were below the poverty line, including 8.6% of those under age 18 and 6.6% of those age 65 or over. As of March 2009, according to Workforce Central Florida, the unemployment rate for Seminole County is 9.2 percent.

=== Religion ===
The following reflects the latest year available for religious statistics, which was 2000.

Religion	Number
Did not claim a religious affiliation	230,901
Catholic	60,191
Evangelical Protestant	48,430
Mainline Protestant	19,713
Other	5,487
Orthodox	474

== Economy ==
In June 2026, the largest employers were Seminole County Public Schools with 6,675 employees, AdventHealth with 6,500 employees, Publix with 4,055 employees, Orlando Health with 3,970 employees and Walmart with 2,326 employees.

== Government and politics ==
Seminole County is part of the strongly Republican belt of central and southwest Florida that was the first portion of the state to politically distance itself from the "Solid South", until Joe Biden carried the county in 2020; the last Democratic Party candidate to win the county in a presidential election had been Harry Truman in 1948, and the last Democrat to win a majority of votes in the county being Franklin D. Roosevelt in 1944. As of October 31, 2024, Republicans outnumbered Democrats 122,489 to 113,260, in registered voters.

United States presidential election results for Seminole County, Florida
Year	Republican		Democratic		Third party(ies)	
Year	No.	%	No.	%	No.	%
1916	155	15.56%	706	70.88%	135	13.55%
1920	767	32.28%	1,485	62.50%	124	5.22%
1924	372	23.46%	945	59.58%	269	16.96%
1928	1,788	58.89%	1,187	39.10%	61	2.01%
1932	948	30.68%	2,142	69.32%	0	0.00%
1936	897	25.80%	2,580	74.20%	0	0.00%
1940	1,369	30.29%	3,150	69.71%	0	0.00%
1944	1,352	31.50%	2,940	68.50%	0	0.00%
1948	1,665	33.25%	2,261	45.16%	1,081	21.59%
1952	4,683	60.02%	3,120	39.98%	0	0.00%
1956	5,841	65.15%	3,125	34.85%	0	0.00%
1960	8,936	64.63%	4,891	35.37%	0	0.00%
1964	10,078	52.48%	9,125	47.52%	0	0.00%
1968	10,821	44.69%	6,120	25.27%	7,275	30.04%
1972	27,658	80.84%	6,503	19.01%	51	0.15%
1976	26,655	56.94%	19,609	41.89%	549	1.17%
1980	39,989	66.16%	17,443	28.86%	3,007	4.98%
1984	56,244	75.91%	17,795	24.02%	53	0.07%
1988	60,401	72.20%	22,635	27.06%	622	0.74%
1992	57,101	48.57%	35,660	30.33%	24,799	21.09%
1996	59,797	52.04%	45,058	39.21%	10,049	8.75%
2000	75,790	55.00%	59,227	42.98%	2,788	2.02%
2004	108,172	58.10%	76,971	41.34%	1,052	0.56%
2008	105,070	50.90%	99,335	48.12%	2,021	0.98%
2012	109,943	52.57%	96,445	46.12%	2,732	1.31%
2016	109,443	48.10%	105,914	46.55%	12,169	5.35%
2020	125,241	47.89%	132,528	50.67%	3,764	1.44%
2024	129,735	51.13%	120,717	47.58%	3,275	1.29%

The government operates under a County Charter adopted in 1989 and amended in November 1994. Policymaking and the legislative authority are vested in the Board of County Commissioners, a five-member board elected to four-year terms in partisan, countywide elections and from single member districts. The board adopts the county budget, levies property taxes and other fees, and hires the county manager and county attorney. In addition to the board, five constitutional officers are elected to partisan, four-year terms in accordance with the constitution of the State of Florida.

The constitutional officers, clerk of the circuit and county courts, sheriff, tax collector, property appraiser, and supervisor of elections, maintain separate accounting records and budgets. The board funds a portion or, in certain instances, all of the operating budgets of the county's constitutional officers.

The county provides a full range of services: the construction and maintenance of the county's infrastructure, public safety, recreation, health and human services, and development and protection of the physical and economic environment.

In addition to the county government described above, there are other political entities which are controlled by the county, but have their own appointed boards; the Seminole County Expressway Authority, the Seminole County Port Authority, the Fred R. Wilson Memorial Law Library and the US 17-92 Community Redevelopment Agency.

=== County elected officials ===
Republicans control all of Seminole County's partisan elected offices. In 2020, despite Joe Biden narrowly winning Seminole County in the presidential election, Republican candidates for county office won by wide margins over their Democratic opponents.

Seminole County Officials
Position	Incumbent	Next election
District 1 Commissioner	Bob Dallari	2028
District 2 Commissioner	Jay Zembower	2026
District 3 Commissioner	Lee Constantine	2028
District 4 Commissioner	Amy Lockhart	2026
District 5 Commissioner	Andria Herr	2028
Clerk of Courts and Comptroller	Grant Maloy	2028
Sheriff	Dennis Lemma	2028
Property Appraiser	David Johnson	2028
Tax Collector	J. R. Kroll	2028
Supervisor of Elections	Amy Pennock	2028
18th Judicial Circuit State Attorney	Phil Archer	2028
18th Judicial Circuit Public Defender	Blaise Trettis	2028

=== Secondary officials ===
==== Seminole Soil and Water Conservation District ====
The Seminole Soil and Water Conservation District serves as an administrative role to conserve the environment within the county.

The following officers are elected as indicated:

Seminole County Soil and Water Conservation District Officers
Group	Name	Position	Election Year
Group 1	Jennifer Webb	Vice Chair & Public Relations	2024
Group 2	Karen Hariot	Chairperson	2026
Group 3	Megan Betche	Secretary	2024
Group 4	Gabbie Milch	Treasurer	2026
Group 5	Vacant	TBD	2024

=== Law enforcement ===
Seminole County Sheriff's Office
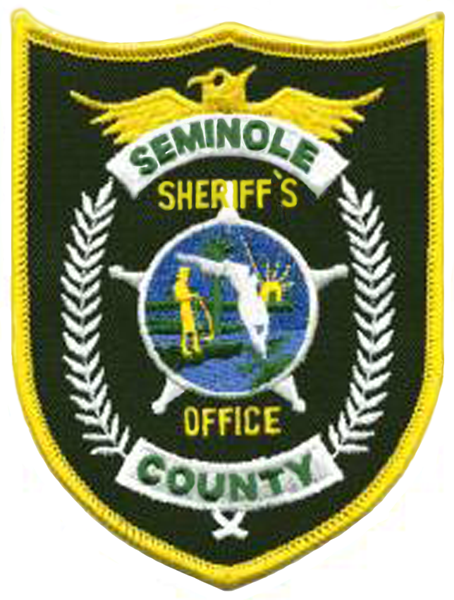
- Abbreviation: SCSO

Agency overview
- Formed: 1913

Jurisdictional structure
- General nature: Local civilian police

Operational structure
- Headquarters: Sanford, Florida
- Agency executive: Dennis M. Lemma, Sheriff

Facilities
- Stations: 4

Website
- www.seminolesheriff.org

The Seminole County Sheriff's Office is the law enforcement agency for unincorporated areas of Seminole County. As of 2022 the current sheriff is Dennis M. Lemma, who took office in 2017.

The Seminole County Sheriff's Office is currently accredited by eight independent bodies:

- American Correctional Association (ACA)
- American Society of Crime Lab Directors Lab Accreditation Board (ASCLD/LAB)
- Commission for Florida Law Enforcement Accreditation (CFA)
- Commission on Accreditation for Law Enforcement Agencies, Inc. (CALEA)
- Florida Corrections Accreditation Commission (FCAC)
- National Commission on Correctional Health Care (NCCHC)
- National Emergency Management Accreditation Program (EMAP)
- Public Safety Communications Accreditation

== Libraries ==
The library system was founded in 1978 by the Seminole County Board of County Commissioners. It contains 500,000 volumes and has a circulation of 2.5 million books annually. There are five branches, located in the cities of Casselberry, Sanford, Lake Mary, Oviedo, and Longwood.

An online catalog is available including access to e-books and audio books. Library cards are restricted to county residents, property owners, students (enrolled in a county public school), or employed by the county government.

== Education ==
Seminole County Public Schools operates public schools.

== Transportation ==
=== Interstates and expressways ===
- I-4
- SR 417 (Seminole Expressway)
- SR 429 (Wekiva Parkway)

=== Surface roads ===
- US 17 / US 92 (French Avenue/Orlando Drive)
- SR 46
- CR 46A
- SR 414
- SR 415
- SR 419
- SR 426
- CR 427
- SR 434
- SR 436

=== Airports ===
- Orlando Sanford International Airport

=== Passenger rail ===
The Amtrak Auto Train service, which transports both passengers and cars, has its southern terminus in Seminole County at the Sanford Amtrak station. (Note: Sanford has separate Amtrak and SunRail stations) The train offers daily service between the Sanford station and a northern terminus in Lorton, Virginia.

The SunRail commuter rail service has stops in four counties in Central Florida, including Seminole County. Seminole County itself contains four SunRail stations: Altamonte Springs, Longwood, Lake Mary, and Sanford.

=== Public transportation ===
LYNX provides public bus service to three counties in Central Florida, including Seminole County. As of January 2026, LYNX operates 3 bus routes in the southern part of the county.

In 2025, the county introduced a microtransit service, dubbed Scout, which replaced most of the county's LYNX routes in early 2026. Scout offers on-demand service in five designated zones across the county, as well as to the University of Central Florida in neighboring Orange County. The service costs $4-14 per ride, depending on the number of zone boundaries crossed during a trip.

== Communities ==
=== Cities ===
- Altamonte Springs
- Casselberry
- Lake Mary
- Longwood
- Oviedo
- Sanford
- Winter Springs

=== Census-designated places ===
- Black Hammock
- Chuluota
- Fern Park
- Forest City
- Geneva
- Goldenrod (with Orange County)
- Heathrow
- Midway
- Wekiwa Springs

=== Unincorporated communities ===
- Bertha
- Indian Mound Village
- Lake Monroe
- Slavia
- Sanlando Springs
- Taintsville
- Tuskawilla

=== Former communities ===
- Markham
- Osceola
- Goldsboro

== See also ==
- Little Big Econ State Forest
- National Register of Historic Places listings in Seminole County, Florida
