= Goldenrod, Florida =

Unincorporated area in Florida, US

- Census-designated place
- Location in Orange County and the state of Florida
- Coordinates: 28°37′02″N 81°17′40″W
- Country: United States
- State: Florida
- Counties: Orange, Seminole

Area
  - Total: 2.68 sq mi (6.95 km^{2})
  - Land: 2.53 sq mi (6.54 km^{2})
  - Water: 0.16 sq mi (0.42 km^{2})
- Elevation: 85 ft (26 m)

Population (2020)
  - Total: 13,431
  - Density: 5,320.7/sq mi (2,054.32/km^{2})
- Time zone: UTC-5 (Eastern (EST))
  - Summer (DST): UTC-4 (EDT)
- ZIP code: 32733
- Area codes: 407, 689
- FIPS code: 12-26475
- GNIS feature ID: 2402536

Goldenrod is a census-designated place (CDP) in Orange and Seminole counties in the U.S. state of Florida. As of the 2020 census, Goldenrod had a population of 13,431. It is part of the Orlando–Kissimmee–Sanford, Florida Metropolitan Statistical Area.

== Geography ==
According to the United States Census Bureau, the CDP has a total area of 7.0 km^{2} (2.7 mi^{2}), of which 6.7 km^{2} (2.6 mi^{2}) is land and 0.3 km^{2} (0.1 mi^{2}) (4.78%) is water.

== Demographics ==
Historical population
Census	Pop.	Note	%±
1980	13,682		—
1990	12,362		−9.6%
2000	12,871		4.1%
2010	12,039		−6.5%
2020	13,431		11.6%

=== 2020 census ===
As of the 2020 census, Goldenrod had a population of 13,431. The median age was 33.5 years. 17.7% of residents were under the age of 18 and 13.6% of residents were 65 years of age or older. For every 100 females there were 105.9 males, and for every 100 females age 18 and over there were 104.1 males age 18 and over.

100.0% of residents lived in urban areas, while 0.0% lived in rural areas.

There were 5,737 households in Goldenrod, of which 23.1% had children under the age of 18 living in them. Of all households, 33.9% were married-couple households, 27.1% were households with a male householder and no spouse or partner present, and 29.0% were households with a female householder and no spouse or partner present. About 30.2% of all households were made up of individuals and 7.9% had someone living alone who was 65 years of age or older.

There were 6,114 housing units, of which 6.2% were vacant. The homeowner vacancy rate was 0.8% and the rental vacancy rate was 7.8%.

Racial composition as of the 2020 census
Race	Number	Percent
White	8,046	59.9%
Black or African American	1,211	9.0%
American Indian and Alaska Native	47	0.3%
Asian	576	4.3%
Native Hawaiian and Other Pacific Islander	18	0.1%
Some other race	1,397	10.4%
Two or more races	2,136	15.9%
Hispanic or Latino (of any race)	3,920	29.2%

=== 2000 census ===
At the 2000 census there were 12,871 people, 5,398 households, and 3,152 families living in the CDP. The population density was 1,918.7/km^{2} (4,963.2/mi^{2}). There were 5,575 housing units at an average density of 831.1/km^{2} (2,149.8/mi^{2}). The racial makeup of the CDP was 82.43% White, 5.53% African American, 0.47% Native American, 2.86% Asian, 0.09% Pacific Islander, 5.38% from other races, and 3.25% from two or more races. Hispanic or Latino of any race were 17.83%.

Of the 5,398 households 26.2% had children under the age of 18 living with them, 42.6% were married couples living together, 11.1% had a female householder with no husband present, and 41.6% were non-families. 28.5% of households were one person and 5.5% were one person aged 65 or older. The average household size was 2.37 and the average family size was 2.98.

The age distribution was 21.4% under the age of 18, 14.6% from 18 to 24, 33.8% from 25 to 44, 20.0% from 45 to 64, and 10.2% 65 or older. The median age was 32 years. For every 100 females, there were 103.1 males. For every 100 females age 18 and over, there were 101.7 males.

The median household income was $41,173 and the median family income was $47,570. Males had a median income of $32,177 versus $25,425 for females. The per capita income for the CDP was $19,830. About 6.6% of families and 10.9% of the population were below the poverty line, including 10.1% of those under age 18 and 4.1% of those age 65 or over.
