= Winter Springs, Florida =

- City
- City of Winter Springs
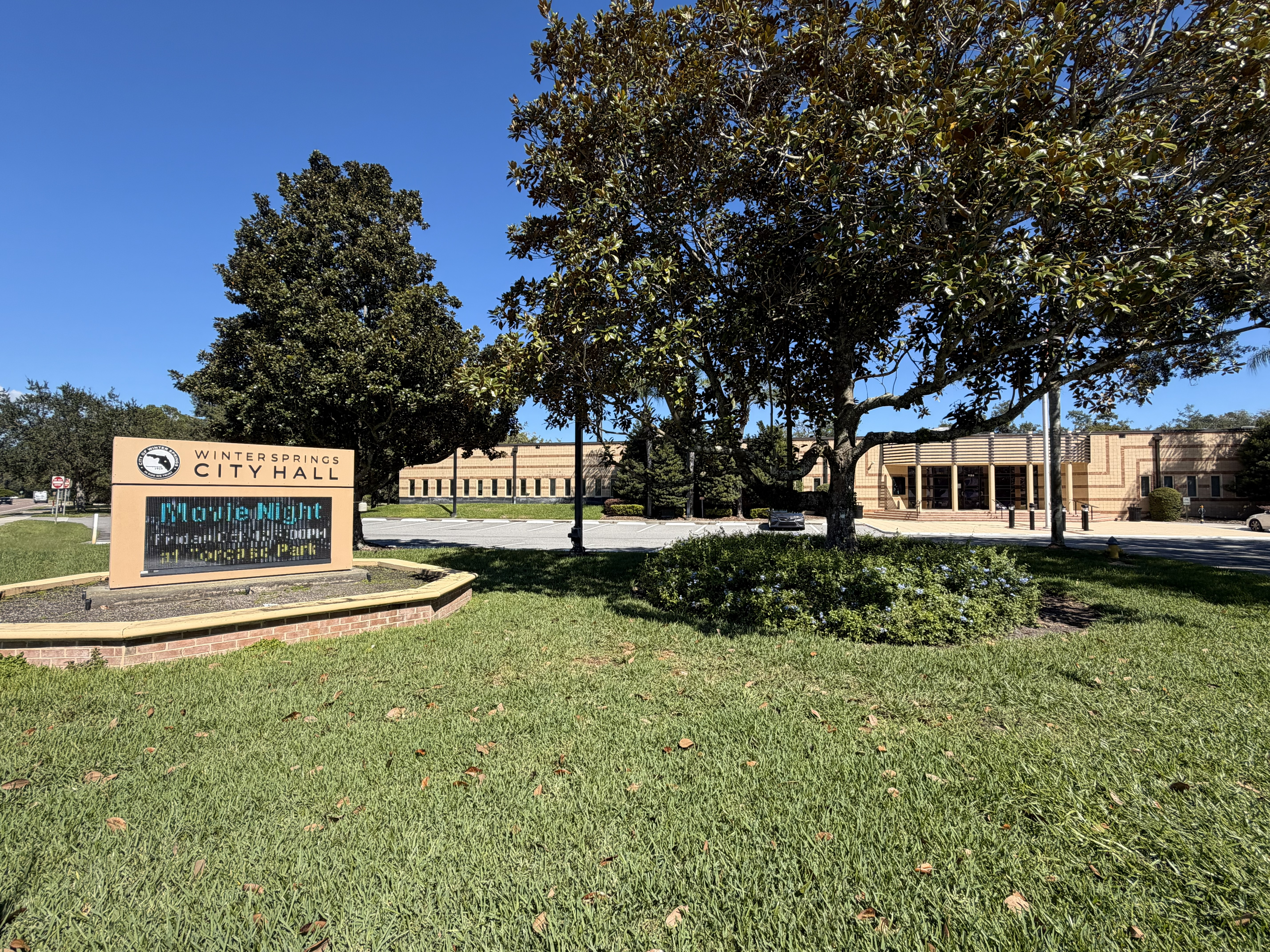
- Winter Springs City Hall

- Seal
- Motto: "In God We Trust"
- Location in Seminole County and the state of Florida
- Coordinates: 28°41′12″N 81°15′10″W
- Country: United States
- State: Florida
- County: Seminole
- Settled (Tuskawilla): c. 1865–1874
- Incorporated (City of North Orlando): 1959
- Incorporated (City of Winter Springs): 1972

Government
  - Type: Commission–Manager

Area
  - Total: 14.99 sq mi (38.83 km^{2})
  - Land: 14.86 sq mi (38.48 km^{2})
  - Water: 0.13 sq mi (0.34 km^{2})
- Elevation: 20 ft (6.1 m)

Population (2020)
  - Total: 38,342
  - Density: 2,580.4/sq mi (996.29/km^{2})
- Time zone: UTC-5 (Eastern (EST))
  - Summer (DST): UTC-4 (EDT)
- ZIP codes: 32708, 32719
- Area codes: 407, 689, 321
- FIPS code: 12-78325
- GNIS feature ID: 2405775
- Website: City of Winter Springs

Winter Springs is a city in Seminole County, Florida, United States. It is part of the Orlando–Kissimmee–Sanford Metropolitan Statistical Area. The population was 38,342 at the 2020 census.

The City of Winter Springs was ranked by the August 2011 issue of Money Magazine as the 97th best place to live in the United States.

== History ==
Around 1865, the city was originally settled as the community of "Tuskawilla", and was officially incorporated as the "City of North Orlando," in 1959. Because it was not adjacent to the City of Orlando, which led to some confusion, it was renamed the "City of Winter Springs", in 1972.

== Geography ==
The City of Winter Springs is located in the central southwest part of Seminole County.

=== Climate ===
The climate in this area is characterized by hot, humid summers and generally mild winters. According to the Köppen climate classification, the City of Winter Springs has a humid subtropical climate zone (Cfa).

== Demographics ==
Historical population
Census	Pop.	Note	%±
1960	609		—
1970	1,161		90.6%
1980	10,475		802.2%
1990	22,151		111.5%
2000	31,666		43.0%
2010	33,282		5.1%
2020	38,342		15.2%
U.S. Decennial Census

=== Racial and ethnic composition ===
Winter Springs racial composition (Hispanics excluded from racial categories) (NH = Non-Hispanic)
Race	Pop 2010	Pop 2020	% 2010	% 2020
White (NH)	25,099	24,825	75.41%	64.75%
Black or African American (NH)	1,672	2,329	5.02%	6.07%
Native American or Alaska Native (NH)	63	53	0.19%	0.14%
Asian (NH)	838	1,366	2.52%	3.56%
Pacific Islander or Native Hawaiian (NH)	15	22	0.05%	0.06%
Some other race (NH)	81	223	0.24%	0.58%
Two or more races/Multiracial (NH)	536	1,660	1.61%	4.33%
Hispanic or Latino (any race)	4,978	7,864	14.96%	20.51%
Total	33,282	38,342	100.00%	100.00%

=== 2020 census ===
As of the 2020 census, Winter Springs had a population of 38,342. The median age was 41.5 years. 20.8% of residents were under the age of 18 and 18.6% of residents were 65 years of age or older. For every 100 females there were 89.6 males, and for every 100 females age 18 and over there were 87.1 males age 18 and over.

100.0% of residents lived in urban areas, while 0.0% lived in rural areas.

There were 15,196 households in Winter Springs, of which 30.9% had children under the age of 18 living in them. Of all households, 52.1% were married-couple households, 13.9% were households with a male householder and no spouse or partner present, and 27.4% were households with a female householder and no spouse or partner present. About 23.0% of all households were made up of individuals and 10.8% had someone living alone who was 65 years of age or older.

There were 15,996 housing units, of which 5.0% were vacant. The homeowner vacancy rate was 1.6% and the rental vacancy rate was 7.3%.

Racial composition as of the 2020 census
Race	Number	Percent
White	26,839	70.0%
Black or African American	2,572	6.7%
American Indian and Alaska Native	101	0.3%
Asian	1,390	3.6%
Native Hawaiian and Other Pacific Islander	28	0.1%
Some other race	2,157	5.6%
Two or more races	5,255	13.7%
Hispanic or Latino (of any race)	7,864	20.5%

=== Income and poverty ===
In 2020, the median household income was $78,969 and the per capita income for the city was $41,803. About 6.5% of the population were below the poverty line.

=== 2010 census ===
As of the 2010 United States census, there were 33,282 people, 11,852 households, and 8,782 families residing in the city.

== Education ==
The local high school is Winter Springs High School.

== Notable people ==
- Denee Benton, Tony Award-winning actress
- Caskey, rapper
- Ocky Clark, former track and field runner for the Pan American Games
- A. J. Cole, professional MLB baseball player
- Kirby Grant, actor
- Ryan Mountcastle, professional MLB baseball player
- Brooklynn Prince, actress
- Zachary "Sneaky" Scuderi, professional League of Legends player
- Riley Greene, professional MLB baseball player, 2x MLB all-star (2024-2025)
