= Chuluota, Florida =

- CDP
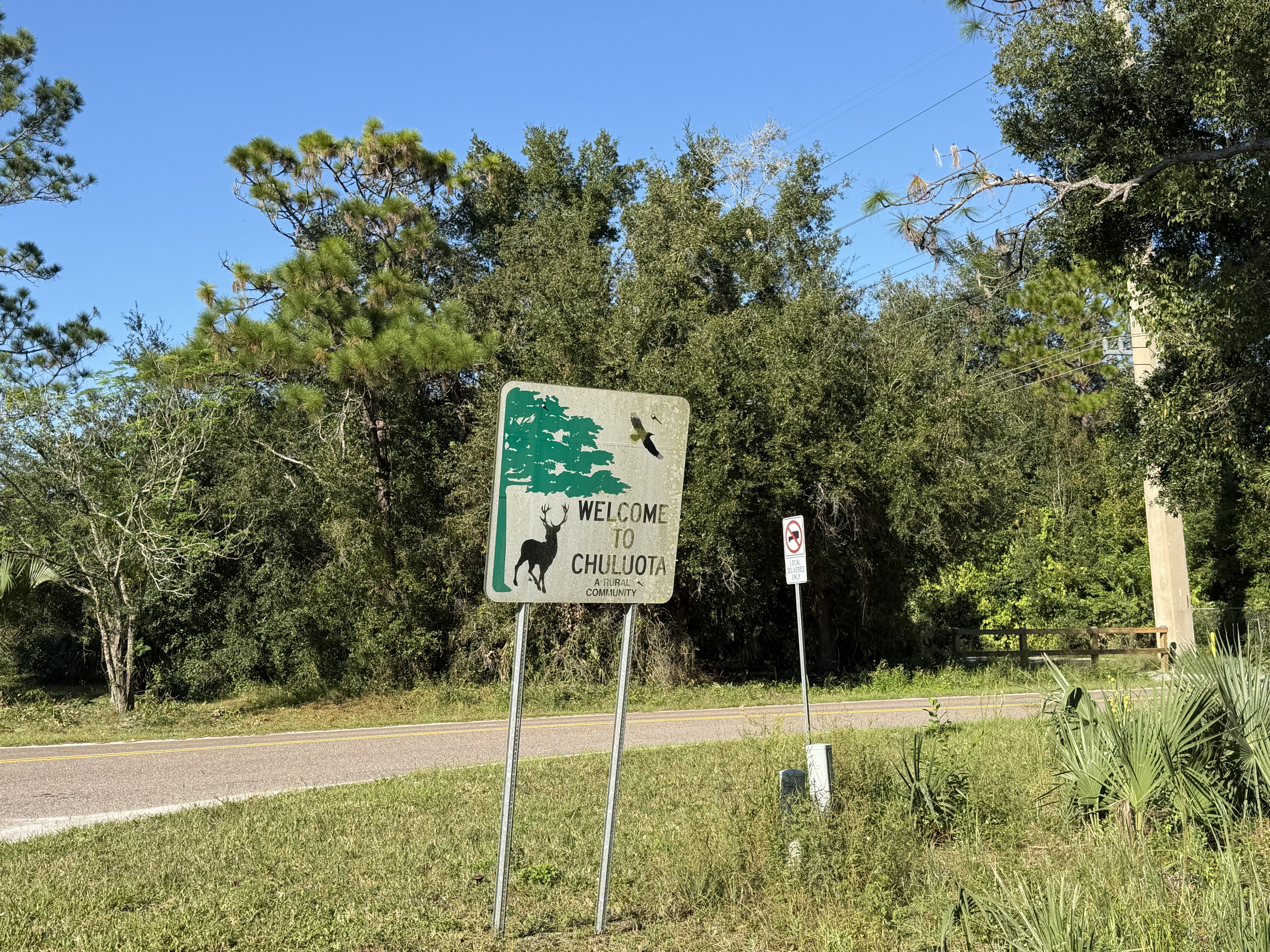
- Chuluota Welcome Sign

- Location in Seminole County and the state of Florida
- Coordinates: 28°38′20″N 81°07′25″W
- Country: United States
- State: Florida
- County: Seminole

Area
  - Total: 2.46 sq mi (6.36 km^{2})
  - Land: 2.04 sq mi (5.29 km^{2})
  - Water: 0.42 sq mi (1.08 km^{2})
- Elevation: 46 ft (14 m)

Population (2020)
  - Total: 2,524
  - Density: 1,236.1/sq mi (477.26/km^{2})
- Time zone: UTC-5 (Eastern (EST))
  - Summer (DST): UTC-4 (EDT)
- ZIP code: 32766
- Area codes: 407, 689, 321
- FIPS code: 12-12275
- GNIS feature ID: 2402773
- Website: Chuluota Community

Chuluota (/tʃuːliˈoʊtə/ choo-lee-OH-tə) is a census-designated place and an unincorporated area in Seminole County, Florida, United States. The population was 2,524 at the 2020 Census. It is part of the Orlando–Kissimmee Metropolitan Statistical Area.

== Geography ==
According to the United States Census Bureau, the CDP has a total area of 5.7 km^{2} (2.2 sq mi), of which 4.7 km^{2} (1.8 sq mi) is land and 1.0 km^{2} (0.39 sq mi) (17.73%) is water.

== Demographics ==
Historical population
Census	Pop.	Note	%±
2020	2,524		—
U.S. Decennial Census

=== 2020 census ===
As of the 2020 census, Chuluota had a population of 2,524. The median age was 39.4 years. 22.7% of residents were under the age of 18 and 13.9% of residents were 65 years of age or older. For every 100 females there were 111.9 males, and for every 100 females age 18 and over there were 107.0 males age 18 and over.

95.4% of residents lived in urban areas, while 4.6% lived in rural areas.

There were 926 households in Chuluota, of which 37.8% had children under the age of 18 living in them. Of all households, 58.2% were married-couple households, 16.3% were households with a male householder and no spouse or partner present, and 17.1% were households with a female householder and no spouse or partner present. About 18.8% of all households were made up of individuals and 7.5% had someone living alone who was 65 years of age or older.

There were 972 housing units, of which 4.7% were vacant. The homeowner vacancy rate was 0.9% and the rental vacancy rate was 8.8%.

Racial composition as of the 2020 census
Race	Number	Percent
White	1,998	79.2%
Black or African American	42	1.7%
American Indian and Alaska Native	8	0.3%
Asian	62	2.5%
Native Hawaiian and Other Pacific Islander	7	0.3%
Some other race	90	3.6%
Two or more races	317	12.6%
Hispanic or Latino (of any race)	397	15.7%

=== 2000 census ===
As of the census of 2000, there were 1,921 people, 701 households, and 532 families residing in the CDP. The population density was 412.1 people/km^{2} (1,067 people/mi^{2}). There were 727 housing units at an average density of 155.9 units/km^{2} (404 units/mi^{2}). The racial makeup of the CDP was 94.53% White, 0.36% African American, 0.88% Native American, 0.57% Asian, 0.05% Pacific Islander, 1.56% from other races, and 2.03% from two or more races. Hispanic or Latino of any race were 5.62% of the population.

There were 701 households, out of which 40.9% had children under the age of 18 living with them, 57.5% were married couples living together, 13.1% had a female householder with no husband present, and 24.0% were non-families. 17.3% of all households were made up of individuals, and 6.1% had someone living alone who was 65 years of age or older. The average household size was 2.74 and the average family size was 3.08.

In the CDP, the population was spread out, with 27.9% under the age of 18, 8.4% from 18 to 24, 34.6% from 25 to 44, 19.5% from 45 to 64, and 9.7% who were 65 years of age or older. The median age was 34 years. For every 100 females, there were 93.1 males. For every 100 females age 18 and over, there were 96.9 males.

The median income for a household in the CDP was $42,105, and the median income for a family was $46,000. Males had a median income of $33,854 versus $23,575 for females. The per capita income for the CDP was $16,641. About 4.1% of families and 5.1% of the population were below the poverty line, including 7.7% of those under age 18 and none of those age 65 or over.

== Schools ==
=== Elementary ===
- Walker Elementary School

Private Schools:

- Double R Private School (Pk-8) (Secular)

== History ==
Chuluota is pronounced "Choo-lee-oh-tah", meaning "Isle of Pines", "Pine Island", or "Land of Lakes and Pines" or "beautiful place", depending upon whom you ask. The pronunciation is a derivative of the Creek Indian word "Chuluoto".

Chuluota was first settled soon after the Civil War. Some of the area's first white residents were from North Carolina who came here by ox cart seeking refuge from the war, and undoubtedly encountered Seminole Indians when they arrived. They found an area teeming with fish, deer, and wild hogs. Orange groves, cattle ranches, a sawmill and turpentine production from the forests of pines were developed by settlers. A railroad provided transportation for passengers and goods.

Robert A. Mills, one of the early developers of the community, is credited with choosing the lyrical Indian name of Chuluota, which was possibly the name of the original Seminole village. Circa 1892, the name was continued by Henry Flagler, who created the Chuluota Land Company to sell land acquired by his Florida East Coast Railroad. Chuluota was originally laid out by Flagler and his Chuluota Land Company to compete with Orlando as the center of trade in the area. Following Flagler's death, the land plats were mainly unused until the 1950s, when a post-war housing boom began to take place. The houses were generally small, and were used by working class Americans seeking affordable living.

The Chuluota School was established in 1898 as a wooden one-room schoolhouse. In 1925, a more modern elementary school was built and was closed in June 1948. This became the volunteer fire station; since 1996, it has served as the home of Veterans of Foreign Wars Post 10139 and is generally considered the community center.

Chuluota's survival was challenged by several events. First, the Great Freeze of 1894-1895 virtually decimated the thriving citrus industry. Next, development was stalled by the bust of the Florida land boom in the 1920s and Flagler's death, and was finally devastated by the Great Depression of the 1930s. Bit by bit, the population of the hamlet dwindled. By the 1960s, new developers made plans to revitalize the community.

It is estimated that one thousand new homes have been built in the area since 2003.
