= List of toll roads in Florida =

- Turnpike and State Toll Road shields

System information
- Notes: State Roads are generally state-maintained.

Highway names
- Interstates: Interstate X (I-X)
- US Highways: U.S. Highway X (US X)
- State: State Road X (SR X)
- County: County Road X (CR X)

System links
- Florida State Highway System; Interstate; US; State; Former; Pre‑1945; Toll; Scenic

As of May 2025, the state of Florida contains 29 toll roads, 8 tolled express lanes, and 13 toll bridges totaling 734 miles (1,181 km).

Toll roads in the state can be operated by the state government (through Florida's Turnpike Enterprise), a local tolling authority (such as Central Florida Expressway Authority, Greater Miami Expressway Agency, or Tampa Hillsborough Expressway Authority), or a county government. Toll roads that are part of the Florida State Highway System (i.e. are numbered state roads) have a unique shield indicating their status as toll roads.

Almost all toll facilities Florida accept payment via toll-by-plate or electronic toll collection (ETC). (Note: Two toll bridges (Hammock Dunes Bridge and Gasparilla Island Bridge) only accept cash tolls) There are three ETC systems in Florida: SunPass (operated by Florida's Turnpike Enterprise), E-PASS (operated by Central Florida Expressway Authority), and LeeWay (operated by Lee County). These systems are fully interoperable within Florida, though support for and by ETC systems in other states (such as E-ZPass) varies. Cash tolls in the state have been phased out on all toll roads and all but three toll bridges.

== Toll roads ==
Number	Length (mi)	Length (km)	Southern or western terminus	Northern or eastern terminus	Local names	Formed	Removed	Notes
I-75	83.91	135.04	CR 951 near Golden Gate	US 27 in Weston	Alligator Alley / Everglades Parkway	1968	current	Operated by FDOT
Florida's Turnpike	264.67	425.95	I-95/US 441/SR 826 in Miami Gardens	I-75 near Wildwood	Ronald Reagan Turnpike (Note: Officially designated as SR 91)	1957	current	Operated by FTE
SR 23	33	53	US 90 in Baldwin	US 17 near Green Cove Springs	First Coast Expressway / Cecil Commerce Center Parkway	2009	current	Operated by FTE; Extension to I-95 proposed
SR 112	4.13	6.65	Miami International Airport in Miami	I-95 in Miami	Airport Expressway	1961	current	Operated by GMX; Continues east of I-95 without tolls as I-195
SR 293	10.77 (Note: Does not include the Mid-Bay Bridge)	17.33	Mid-Bay Bridge at Choctawhatchee Bay	SR 85 in Niceville	Walter Francis Spence Parkway	2011	current	Operated by FDOT on behalf of the Mid-Bay Bridge Authority
SR 408	22.11	35.58	Florida's Turnpike in Gotha	SR 50 in Alafaya	Spessard L. Holland East-West Expressway	1973	current	Operated by FTE and CFX
SR 414	9.38	15.10	SR 429/US 441 in Apopka (Note: concurrent with SR 429 for 3.4 miles (5.5 km))	US 441 in Lockhart	John Land Apopka Expressway	2009	current	Operated by CFX; Continues east without tolls
SR 417	54.06	87.00	I-4 in Celebration	I-4/SR 429 in Sanford	Seminole Expressway / Central Florida GreeneWay / Southern Connector / Orlando East Bypass	1988	current	Operated by FTE and CFX
SR 429	53.61	86.28	I-4 in Four Corners	I-4/SR 417 in Sanford	Daniel Webster Western Beltway / Wekiva Parkway	2000 (Note: final segment opened in 2024)	current	Operated by FTE, CFX, and FDOT
SR 451	1.87	3.01	SR 414/SR 429 in Apopka	US 441 in Apopka	Apopka Connector	2013	current	Operated by CFX
SR 452	1.6	2.6	SR 417 in Sanford	Lake Mary Boulevard and Red Cleveland Boulevard in Sanford	Seminole Connector	proposed	—	To be operated by CFX; Scheduled to begin construction in 2031; SFB Access Road
SR 453	3.36	5.41	SR 429 in Apopka	SR 46 in Mount Dora	Mount Dora Connector	2018	current	Operated by CFX
SR 516	4.40	7.08	US 27 in Clermont	SR 429 in Horizon West	Lake-Orange Connector	proposed	—	To be operated by CFX; Completion estimated in 2029
SR 528	53.50	86.10	I-4 near Williamsburg	I-95/SR 407 in Cocoa	Martin Andersen Beachline Expressway / Bee Line Expressway	1974	current	Operated by FTE and CFX
SR 538	7.22	11.62	Polk/Osceola in Loughman	CR 580 in Poinciana	Poinciana Parkway	2016	current	Operated by CFX; Continues northwest without tolls Extension to Florida's Turnpike and Interstate 4 proposed
SR 568	3.04	4.89	SR 589 in Northdale	SR 597 in Cheval	Veterans Expressway	2001	current	Operated by FTE; Formerly part of SR 589
SR 570	24.38	39.24	I-4 in Lakeland	I-4 near Polk City	Polk Parkway	1999	current	Operated by FTE
SR 570B	6.50	10.46	SR 570 near Auburndale	US 17/SR 35 in Bartow	Central Polk Parkway	proposed	—	To be operated by FTE; Completion estimated for 2029; Extension to I-4 proposed
SR 589	67.50	108.63	I-275/SR 60 in Tampa	SR 44 near Lecanto	Suncoast Parkway / Veterans Expressway	1994	current	Operated by FTE; Extension to US 19/US 98 proposed
SR 618	14.13	22.74	US 92 in Tampa	I-75 in Brandon	Lee Roy Selmon Expressway	1976	current	Operated by THEA
SR 686A	1.44	2.32	Bayside Bridge in Largo	SR 690 in Pinellas Park	Gateway Expressway	2024	current	Operated by FDOT; In median of non-freeway SR 686
SR 690	3.10	4.99	US 19 in Pinellas Park	I-275 in St. Petersburg	Gateway Expressway	2024	current	Operated by FTE
Florida's Turnpike Extension	47.86	77.02	US 1 in Florida City	Florida's Turnpike in Miramar	Homestead Extension of Florida's Turnpike (Note: Officially designated as SR 821)	1973	current	Operated by FTE
SR 836	14.20	22.85	SR 825 in Tamiami	I-95 in Miami	Dolphin East–West Expressway	1969	current	Operated by GMX; Continues east of I-95 without tolls as I-395
SR 869	21.84	35.15	I-75/I-595 in Sunrise	Florida's Turnpike in Coconut creek	Sawgrass Expressway	1986	current	Operated by FTE
SR 874	7.03	11.31	Florida's Turnpike Extension in Three Lakes	SR 826 in Glenvar Heights	Don Shula Expressway	1973	current	Operated by GMX
SR 878	2.66	4.28	SR 874 in Sunset	US 1 in South Miami	Snapper Creek Expressway	1980	current	Operated by GMX
SR 924	5.38	8.66	I-75/SR 826 in Miami Lakes	SR 953 in Opa-Locka	Gratigny Parkway	1992	current	Operated by GMX
CR 522	6.20	9.98	SR 417 near Celebration	US 17/US 92 near Kissimmee	Osceola Parkway	1995	current	Operated by Osceola County and tolled by CFX
CR 0344	5.20	8.37	CR 0361 near Tallahassee	CR 155/CR 0342 near Tallahassee	Orchard Pond Parkway	2016	current	Operated by Leon County on behalf of Orchard Pond Plantation
Goldenrod Road Extension	2.50	4.02	SR 528 in Orlando	SR 15/SR 551 in Orlando	Goldenrod Road Extension (Note: Unsigned segment of SR 551)	2003	current	Operated by CFX
I-4/Selmon Expressway Connector	2.00	3.22	SR 618 in Tampa, Florida	I-4 in Tampa, Florida	I-4/Selmon Expressway Connector / Crosstown Connector	2014	current	Operated by FTE
Proposed and unbuilt

== Express lanes ==
Logo for FDOT-operated express lanes

In Florida, seven highways feature tolled express lanes for a total of 95.9 miles (154.3 km). Most express lanes in the state are operated by the Florida Department of Transportation. (Note: The Lee Roy Selmon Reversible Express Lanes (SR 618A) are operated by the Tampa-Hillsborough Expressway Authority)

All express lanes in the state utilize open road tolling, requiring the use of a SunPass-compatible transponder. Toll-by-plate is supported only by the Lee Roy Selmon Reversible Express Lanes (SR 618A); on all other highways, drivers without a transponder are subject to a fine.

Number	Length (mi)	Length (km)	Southern or western terminus	Northern or eastern terminus	Local names	Formed	Removed	Notes
I-4	21	34	SR 435 in Orlando	SR 434 in Longwood	I-4 Express	2022	current	Two lanes per direction Extensions to SR 472 and US 27 proposed
I-75	15	24	SR 826 in Miami Lakes	I-595/SR 869 in Sunrise	I-75 Express Lanes	2018	current	Two lanes per direction; connects to Palmetto Expressway (SR 826) express lanes and I-595 express lanes
I-95	21	34	I-395/SR 836 in Miami	SR 842 in Fort Lauderdale	95 Express	2008	current	Two lanes per direction; low-emission vehicles and carpools may register for toll exemption; Extension to Palm Beach County currently being completed
I-295	9.6	15.4	W: I-95 in Jacksonville; E: SR 9B in Jacksonville	W: SR 13 in Jacksonville; E: SR 202 in Jacksonville	I-295 Express Lanes	2019	current	Two discontinuous segments; both two lanes per direction
I-595	9.5	15.3	I-75/SR 869 in Sunrise	I-95 in Fort Lauderdale	595 Express	2014	current	Three reversible lanes; connects to I-75 express lanes
SR 618A	10.8	17.4	Meridian Avenue in Tampa	I-75 in Brandon	Lee Roy Selmon Reversible Express Lanes	2006	current	Three reversible lanes
SR 826	9	14	SR 968 near Miami	I-75 Express in Miami Lakes	Palmetto Express	2019	current	Two lanes per direction; connects to I-75 express lanes

== Toll bridges and causeways ==
Bridges and causeways use open-road tolling and toll-by-plate unless otherwise specified. Listed base tolls are for two-axle vehicles paid by a supported transponder (usually SunPass, E-Pass, or LeeWay)

Bridge/Causeway	Length	S/W Terminus	N/E Terminus	Crossing	Opened	Base toll	Notes
Bob Sikes Bridge	0.7 miles (1.1 km)	CR 399 in Pensacola Beach	US 98 in Gulf Breeze	Santa Rosa Sound	1973	$1.00	Operated by the Santa Rosa Island Authority; Only tolled southbound
Broad Causeway	0.8 mi (1.3 km)	US 1 in North Miami	SR A1A in Surfside	Biscayne Bay	1951	$1.50	Operated by the Bay Harbor Islands municipality
Cape Coral Bridge	0.64 miles (1.03 km)	Del Prado Boulevard in Cape Coral	SR 867 in McGregor	Caloosahatchee River	1997	$2.00	Operated by Lee County; Only tolled westbound
Card Sound Bridge	0.5 mi (0.80 km)	CR 905 in North Key Largo	US 1 in Florida City	Card Sound	1926	$2.08	Operated by the Card Sound Toll Authority
Garcon Point Bridge	3.5 mi (5.6 km)	US 98 in Midway	CR 191 in Garcon Point	East Bay	1999	$2.30	Operated by Florida's Turnpike Enterprise (Note: Originally constructed by Santa Rosa Bay Bridge Authority; transferred to FDOT in 2022)
Boca Grande Causeway	2.5 mi (4.0 km)	Gulf Shores Drive near Boca Grande	Placida Road near Placida	Gasparilla Sound	1958	$6.00	Operated by the Gasparilla Island Bridge Authority; Only tolled southbound Cash only
Hammock Dunes Bridge	0.5 mi (0.80 km)	Palm Harbor Drive in Palm Coast	SR A1A in Hammock Dunes	Matanzas River	1988	$3.00	Operated by the Dunes Community Development District; Only tolled eastbound Cash only
Mid-Bay Bridge	3.6 miles (5.8 km)	US 98 near Destin	SR 20 near Bluewater Bay	Choctawhatchee Bay	1993	$3.00	Operated by the Mid-Bay Bridge Authority; Accepts cash
Midpoint Memorial Bridge	1.25 miles (2.01 km)	Del Prado Boulevard in Cape Coral	SR 867 in Fort Myers	Caloosahatchee River	1997	$2.00	Operated by Lee County; Only tolled westbound
Pinellas Bayway	4.0 mi (6.4 km)	S: Anderson Boulevard in Fort De Soto Park; E: Leeland Street in Bayway Isles; W: SR 699 in St. Pete Beach	S: Shores Boulevard in Tierra Verde; E: I-275/US 19 in St. Petersburg; W: Bahia Del Mar Boulevard in St. Petersburg	Boca Ciega Bay	1962	S: $0.28; W/E: $0.58	Operated by the Florida Department of Transportation; System of three toll bridges, each tolled only one way
Rickenbacker Causeway	5.6 mi (9.0 km)	US 1 in North Miami	Harbor Drive in Key Biscayne	Biscayne Bay	1947	$2.25	Operated by Miami-Dade County; Only tolled southbound
Sanibel Causeway	3 miles (4.8 km)	Periwinkle Way in Sanibel	CR 867 in Punta Rassa	San Carlos Bay	1963	$6.00	Operated by Lee County; Only tolled westbound
Sunshine Skyway Bridge	5.5 miles (8.9 km)	US 19 near Terra Ceia	Pinellas Point Drive in St. Petersburg	Lower Tampa Bay	1987	$1.16	Operated by the Florida Department of Transportation
Venetian Causeway	2.5 miles (4.0 km)	US 1 in Miami	SR 907 in Miami Beach	Biscayne Bay	1925	$2.25	Operated by Miami-Dade County

=== Former toll bridges ===
Bridge/Causeway	Length	S/W Terminus	N/E Terminus	Crossing	Opened	Toll removed	Base toll	Notes
Navarre Beach Causeway	0.11 miles (0.18 km)	CR 399 in Navarre Beach	US 98 in Navarre	Santa Rosa Sound	1960	2004	$0.50	Toll was removed when operation passed from FDOT to Santa Rosa County; Reintroduction of tolls has been proposed
