= Florida State Road 538 =

Highway in Florida

State Road 538
- Poinciana Parkway
- SR 538 highlighted in red

Route information
- Maintained by CFX
- Length: 7.22 mi (11.62 km)
- Existed: April 30, 2016–present

Major junctions
- West end: Kinney Harmon Road in Loughman
- East end: CR 580 in Poinciana

Location
- Country: United States
- State: Florida
- Counties: Osceola, Polk

Highway system
- Florida State Highway System; Interstate; US; State; Former; Pre‑1945; Toll; Scenic
← SR 536	→ SR 539

State Road 538 (SR 538), also known as the Poinciana Parkway, is a 7.2-mile (11.6 km) controlled-access toll road built in Osceola and Polk Counties, Florida. Construction began in 2013 and was completed in 2016. The road had been planned for decades to provide a traffic outlet from Poinciana northwest to US 17/US 92 and Interstate 4. Costs skyrocketed after land along the planned route was converted to a mitigation bank, requiring a bridge to span most of the 1.2 miles (1.9 km) stretch through the restored wetland. The road was originally planned to be built by Avatar—the primary developer of Poinciana—as a four-lane, limited-access highway; after the decision was made to build the bridge across the mitigation bank a toll was planned for the bridge segment of the road, but the collapse of the 2000s housing bubble and increased costs forced Avatar to abandon their plans to build the private toll road. About the same time, Osceola County formed the Osceola County Expressway Authority to build a loop road around the Kissimmee-St.Cloud area, which would include the Poinciana Parkway.

== Route description ==
The Poinciana Parkway is a two-lane freeway, designed to be expanded to a four-lane freeway, that runs between the Polk-Osceola County line and the Cypress Parkway (CR 580) (Note: This road is not a limited-access road as the name may suggest.) in Poinciana, with a large section crossing undeveloped swampland. The highway is contiguous with Kinney Harmon Road in Polk County, which connects the Poinciana Parkway with US 17/US 92 in Loughman. Across US 17/92, the road continues as Ronald Reagan Parkway (former County Road 54), which provides indirect access from the Poinciana Parkway to Interstate 4.

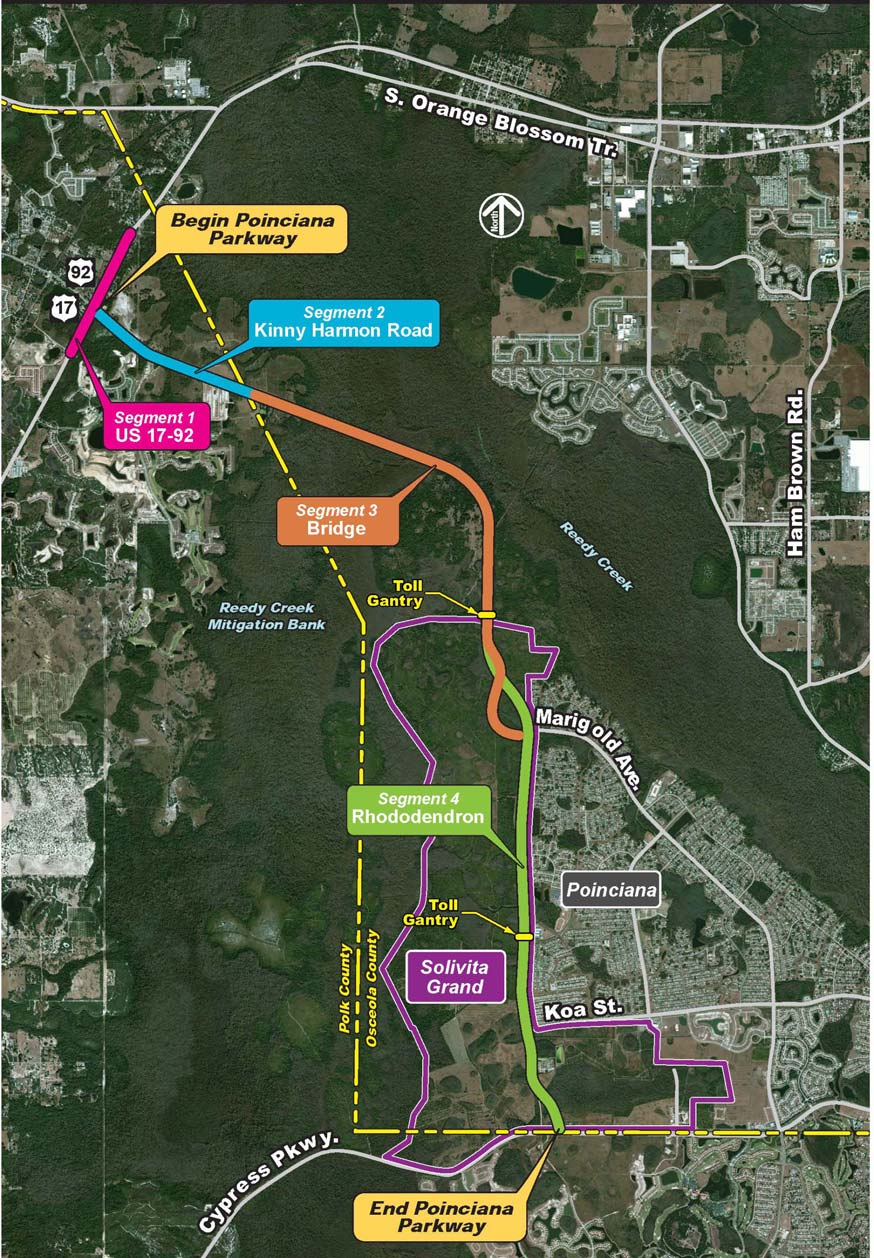
Overview of the Poinciana Parkway's route (orange & green). Solivita Grand (purple outline) is a large, planned residential development.

From the northwest, the road passes through the Reedy Creek Mitigation Bank—a conserved area of wetlands—where it crosses a 6,200-foot (1,900 m) bridge, then makes a turn to the south. South of the bridge, the parkway has grade-separated partial intersections (southbound exits, northbound entrances) with Marigold Avenue and KOA Street and terminates at an at-grade T-intersection with Cypress Parkway. Electronic-only toll gantries are located between the RCMB bridge and Marigold Avenue and between Marigold Avenue and KOA Street; all tolls are collected using either wireless transponders (SunPass or E-Pass) or using "pay by plate" billing, in which a photo of the license plate is captured and the vehicle owner is sent a bill by mail for the appropriate toll.

With a SunPass or E-Pass transponder, a $1.75 toll is charged at a toll gantry north of Marigold Avenue to cross the RCMB and an additional $0.50 toll is charged between Marigold Avenue and KOA Street; the tolls using the pay-by-plate billing system are $1.95 and $0.70, respectively.

== History ==
The Poinciana Parkway is a long-conceived road to provide access on the northwest side of the planned urban development of Poinciana. The first plans for the new community were made around 1970 to develop tens of thousands of acres of rural land along the border between Osceola and Polk Counties. Parker-Poinciana Properties, the developer owning the land on which Poinciana was built, envisioned a bedroom community of 250,000, minutes away from jobs and entertainment (plans to build nearby Disney World were announced in 1966). In the past, the proposed highway has also been called the "Parker Highway Project" and "Parker-Poinciana Highway".

However, development proceeded slowly through the 1980s and early 1990s, in part due to inadequate planning. One significant problem that has limited development is limited road access to the area; Poinciana is surrounded by extensive wetlands and lakes with few arterial roads leading out of the community. In the late 1970s, Polk County built an unrelated road also named "Poinciana Parkway" leading south and the Cypress Parkway was built leading west to Haines City. In 1981, Poinciana Boulevard was extended to US 192 to improve access to I-4 and Kissimmee. In 1998, Pleasant Hill Boulevard was widened to four lanes. In the 2000s, a housing boom led to a huge increase in the town's population, from 13,647 in 2000 to 53,193 in 2010. Since Poinciana is intended to be a bedroom community, improved road access is seen as essential to the community's future; prior to the construction of the Poinciana Parkway, the average commute was 45 minutes, which was among the highest commute times for small cities in the US.

Avatar—one of the main developers of Poinciana—had long planned to connect Kinney Harmon Road with the Cypress Parkway in order to relieve congestion along Poinciana and Pleasant Hill Boulevards. However, the highway would not be built until the company was able to develop the community according to plan. Despite being included in the comprehensive land use plans of both Polk and Osceola Counties, the Polk County Commission voted in 1997 to vacate right-of-way along Kinney Harmon Road to a developer to build a 495-lot mobile home park, a move that would effectively block construction of the Poinciana Parkway. The commissioners noted that the road had been discussed for years, but there were still no plans to build it at the time. Avatar sued the county and the 10th Judicial Circuit ruled that the commissioners did not explain why vacating the right-of-way would be in the public interest when making their decision. Osceola County had objected the commissioners' decision and helped Avatar in the case, but did not join the lawsuit.

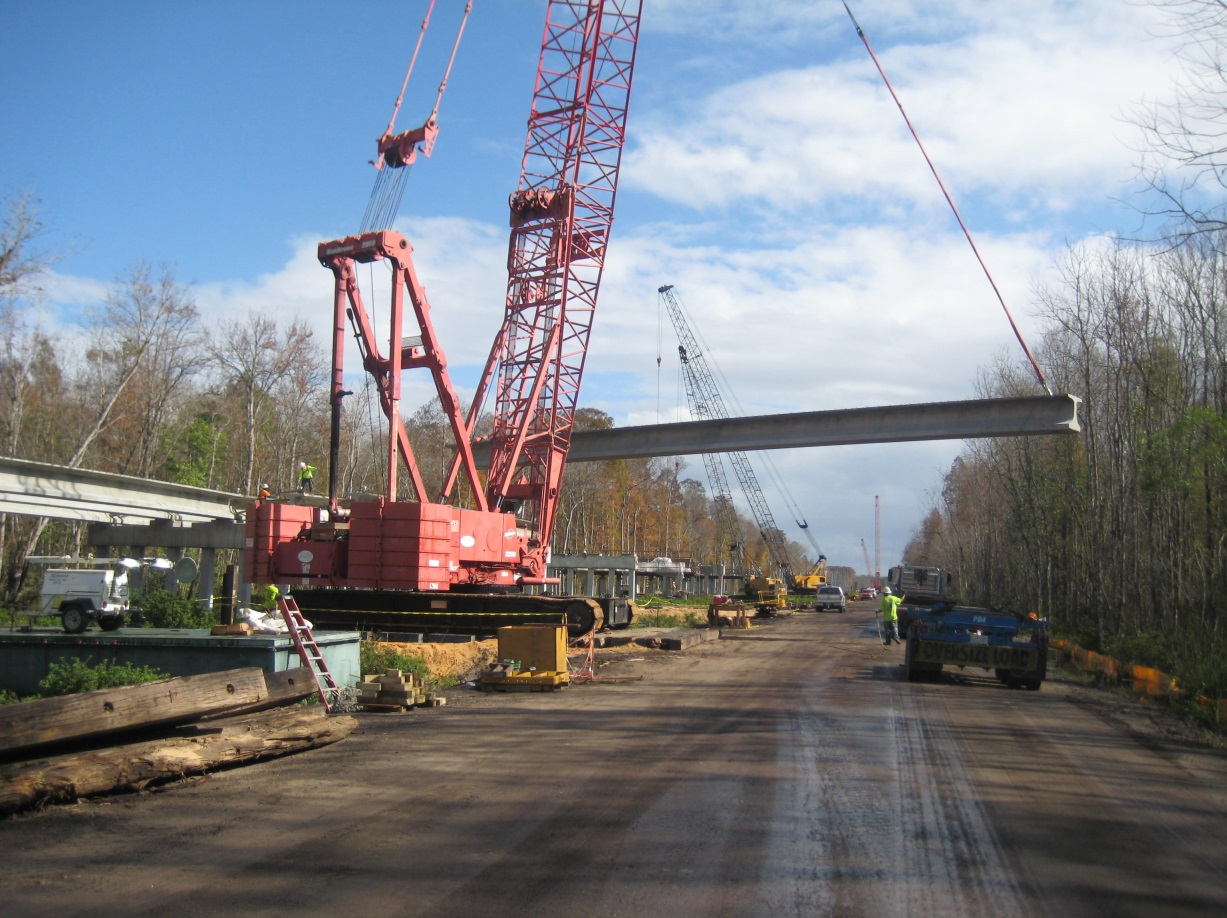
Bridge being built across the Reedy Creek Mitigation Bank and the temporary access road. The expensive mile-long (1.6 km) bridge was required by the U.S. Army Corps of Engineers to mitigate damage to the protected wetlands.

In 1994, Avatar spent $1.5 million for a conceptual permit from the South Florida Water Management District and also received permission from the US Army Corps of Engineers to construct a road across wetland to the northwest of Poinciana, even though they did not own that land at the time. In 1997, private investors received a permit from SFWMD to establish the Reedy Creek Mitigation Bank (RCMB) in the same area. The RCMB is a 3,500-acre (1,400 ha) mitigation bank to restore wetlands, which would then be protected in perpetuity by state and federal law. The investors receive credits from the state for restoring and protecting the wetlands. Developers purchase the credits to offset the destruction of wetlands elsewhere. The Poinciana Parkway would cross 1.2 mi (1.9 km) of the RCMB.

The establishment of the RCMB despite previous plans for the road became a barrier to the Poinciana Parkway's construction. There was concern of setting a precedent of allowing development in conservation areas that are supposed to be protected from development. In order to preserve the wetland habitat, officials wanted a bridge over the wetland habitat, while Avatar contended that bridging the wetland would be too expensive and proposed short bridges or culverts for water and animals to pass. In 2008, the Army Corps of Engineers determined that the road could only be built if it included two 2,000 ft (610 m) bridges, adding $20–40 million to the project's cost or remove the land north of the wetlands from the bank, compensating the bank's owners. The Corps also considered other alignments that would avoid the bank, but concluded that they were worse logistically, environmentally, or traffic-wise.

In 1997, the highway was estimated to cost $8 million to connect the end of Kinney Harmon Road with the end of Marigold Avenue. The RCMB saga skyrocketed cost estimates to construct the four-lane highway from $22 million in 2004 to $140–200 million in 2008. Avatar planned to build 10 miles (16 km) of road, retaining 4.15 mi (6.68 km) of the highway to operate as a toll road and donate the rest to Osceola County. In early 2008, Avatar planned to build the highway in 2009. Avatar had originally planned to construct a four-lane divided expressway within a right-of-way that would allow expansion to a six-lane expressway with a frontage road. The company had also planned to convert Marigold Avenue into a limited-access road as part of the Poinciana Parkway project.

However, the 2000s housing bubble that drove significant growth of Poinciana collapsed and Avatar was unable to justify the costs or finance construction of the highway. Around 2010, Avatar decided not to build the highway while at the same time, the state established the Osceola County Expressway Authority (OCX) to develop and built a series of toll road segments in Osceola County. The 2040 Master Plan developed by OCX has a loop route around the south and east sides of the Kissimmee-St.Cloud area. The Poinciana Parkway is a natural part of the proposed loop road.

In 2012, an agreement was reached between Orange County, Polk County, OCX, and Avatar to construct the highway. Avatar donated approximately $48 million worth of right-of-way, studies/engineering work, construction plans, and permits and gave Polk County a 9.8-acre (4.0 ha) parcel of land designated as a "public safety site" (future fire station and communications tower). Osceola County agreed to provide $6 million and cover any shortfall between the cost of construction and the sale of bonds plus Polk County's contribution. Polk County agreed to contribute $6 million to the project (of which $3 million was to be reimbursed by FDOT), but is not obligated to contribute to any further expansion of the highway.

=== Construction ===
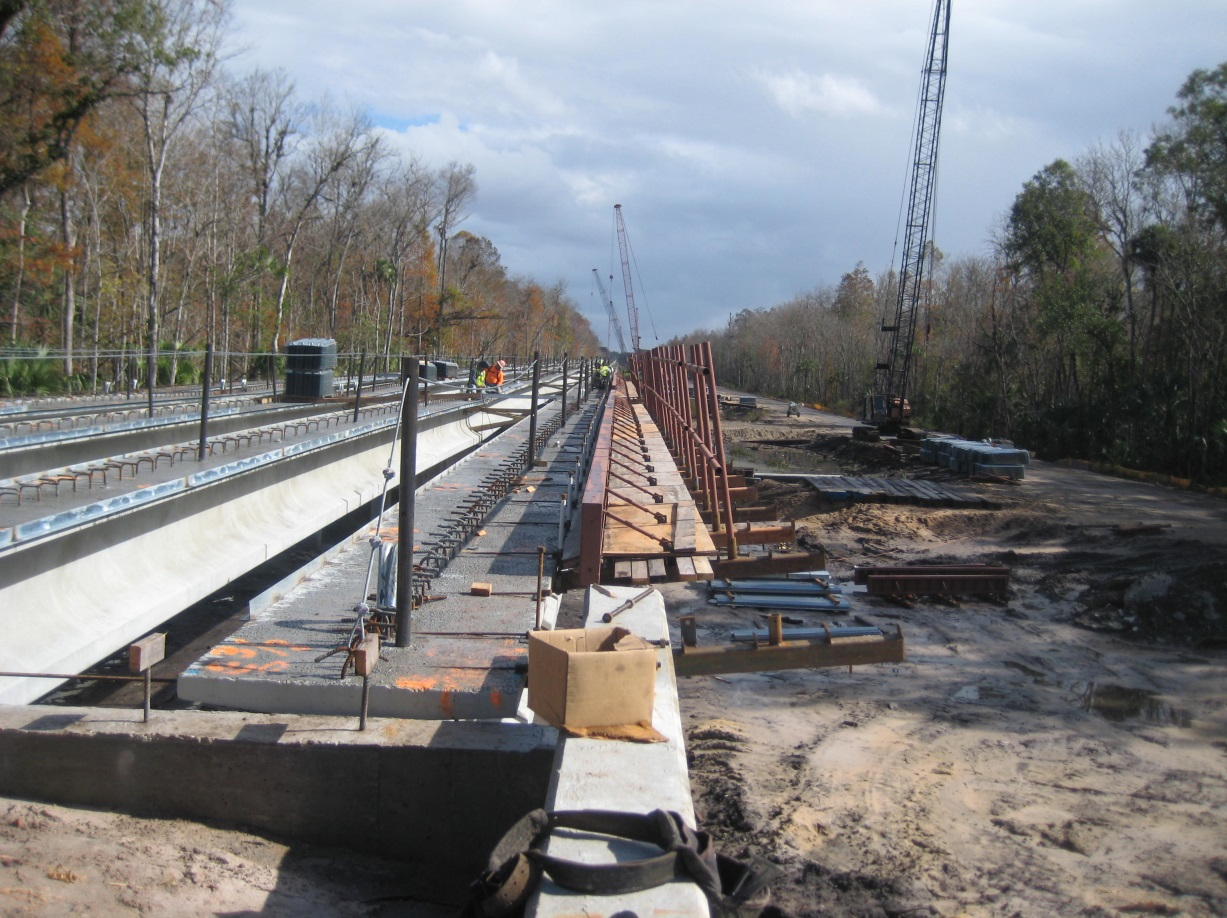
West end of the bridge over the RCMB as it is being built.

The construction of the Poinciana Parkway included the realignment/reconstruction of Kinney Harmon Road in Polk County and improvements to US 17/92 around the intersection with Kinney Harmon Road, improvements to the Cypress Parkway around the new intersection with the southern terminus of the Poinciana Parkway, and short extension of KOA Road.

Soon after its establishment, OCX decided to limit construction costs to $70 million, a figure which is in addition to approximately $50 million of plans, permits, and right-of-way donated by Avatar, who will not be reimbursed. Because of the cost limit, the decision was made to build a two-lane highway initially, using a design that will easily permit the road to be widened to a four- or six-lane expressway in the future. In July 2013, a design-build contract for the highway was awarded to Jr. Davis Construction Company, based in Kissimmee. The total contract amount was $69,013,443.76, representing $68,788,000.00 for the original contract and $225,443.76 for changes to the project after bidding.

The second-place bidder, Lane Construction Corporation, sued OCX after an appeal of the decision was rejected by the OCX board. Lane alleged that scoring of the bids were improperly skewed in Jr. Davis' favor and that the latter was not properly licensed. Lane's bid was cheaper, at $62 million, but OCX determined that the Jr. Davis bridge design was superior. Lane did not succeed with the lawsuit and a notice to proceed, authorizing construction to begin, was issued in December 2013. To construct the bridge, a temporary haul road was constructed across the RCMB. The northern segment of the Poinciana Parkway, from US17/US92 to Marigold Avenue, opened to traffic on April 30, 2016; the southern segment of the Poinciana Parkway, from Marigold Avenue to the Cypress Parkway, opened on November 18, 2016.

== OCX and financing ==
OCX logo

Construction of the highway was primarily financed by the sale of municipal bonds by OCX, backed financially by Osceola County. About $42 million of the bonds were purchased by Vanguard. Standard & Poor's gave the bonds a BBB- rating, just one level above junk bond status, calling OCX traffic expectations "aggressive." The traffic projection for supporting the bond sale was 8,992 vehicles per day. The first full week without a holiday after the opening of the entire highway, November 28-December 2, 2016, an average of 6,896 vehicles per day traveled the highway.

The rating may affect the proposed merger of OCX with the Central Florida Expressway Authority (CFX), which succeeded the Orlando Orange County Expressway Authority (OOCEA) in 2014. The state legislature has considered merging the two agencies to form a regional expressway authority that would also include Lake and Seminole Counties. In early 2014, prior to the creation of the CFX, OOCEA bonds had identical "A"/"A2" (from Fitch/Moody's) credit ratings and there was concern that the poorly-rated OCX bonds would impact the finances of a combined agency and OOCEA bondholders. The OOCEA's chairman Walter Ketcham remarked that the OCX bonds were so poorly rated "we wouldn't touch them with gloves". In September 2016, CFX agreed to study future road projects in Osceola County, in order to determine which are viable for financing and construction, on behalf of OCX for an 18-month period. Legislation passed by the Florida legislature in 2014 envisions the CFX and OCX merging by 2018 and the agreement is a step towards that plan.

The OCX contracted with the CFX to collect all toll revenues and place them in a trust indenture. As trustees of the trust indenture, BB&T is responsible for allocating receipts into nine different funds.

== Future ==
External images
- Alignments under study for I-4 Connector
- Alignments under study for Southport Connector

The Osceola County Expressway Authority's 2040 master plan includes the Poinciana Parkway in a belt route around the Kissimmee area in northwest Osceola County. Both a connection to I-4, known as the I-4 Poinciana Parkway Connector, and a connection to Florida's Turnpike, a segment known as the Southport Connector, are undergoing alignment and environmental studies, which are expected to be completed in mid-2020. The 2040 master plan includes an extension from the intersection of the Southport Connector and Florida's Turnpike around to the east end of the existing Osceola Parkway, including a connection with SR 417 and Orlando International Airport.

== Exit list ==
The entire route is in Poinciana, Osceola County.

mi	km	Exit	Destinations	Notes
		1	I-4 – Orlando, Tampa SR 429 north (Western Expressway) – Apopka	Future western end of FL 538; continue onto FL 429
		Proposed Toll Gantry		
		2	CR 532 (Osceola Polk Line Road)	Future eastbound exit and westbound entrance
		3	US 17 / US 92 (Orange Blossom Trail)	Future diverging-diamond interchange (DDI)
0.00	0.00	–	Kinney Harmon Road	Current western terminus; to US 17 / US 92; continuation into Polk County
0.49– 1.66	0.79– 2.67	Reedy Creek Mitigation Bank bridge		
2.98	4.80	Marigold Mainline Toll Gantry		
3.97	6.39	9	Marigold Avenue	
5.50	8.85	Toll Gantry		
6.37	10.25	11	Koa Street	Eastbound exit and westbound entrance; future full interchange
7.22	11.62	–	CR 580 (Cypress Parkway) / Solivita Boulevard	Current eastern terminus; at-grade intersection; future interchange
		Proposed Toll Gantry		
			Solivita Boulevard / Marigold Avenue / Cypress Branch Road	Future interchange
		Proposed Toll Gantry		
			Pleasant Hill Road / Old Pleasant Hill Road	Future interchange; westbound exit and eastbound entrance
			"Interchange A"	Future interchange
		Proposed Toll Gantry		
			"Interchange B"	Future interchange
		Proposed Toll Gantry		
			"Interchange C"	Future interchange
			Florida's Turnpike – Miami, Ocala	Partial stack interchange; eastbound exit and westbound entrance
			CR 523 (Canoe Creek Road)	Future eastern terminus; at-grade intersection
1.000 mi = 1.609 km; 1.000 km = 0.621 mi: Electronic toll collection; Incomplete access; Unopened

== See also ==
- Central Florida Expressway Authority
- Florida State Highway System
- List of toll roads in Florida
