= Florida State Road 516 =

Proposed state highway in Florida

State Road 516
- Lake–Orange Expressway

Route information
- Maintained by CFX
- Length: 4.4 mi (7.1 km)

Major junctions
- West end: US 27
- CR 455
- East end: SR 429 in Horizon West

Location
- Country: United States
- State: Florida
- Counties: Lake, Orange

Highway system
- Florida State Highway System; Interstate; US; State; Former; Pre‑1945; Toll; Scenic
← SR 514	→ SR 517

State Road 516 (SR 516) is a toll road under construction by the Central Florida Expressway Authority (CFX). Once completed, it will serve an important transportation link between US Highway 27 (US 27) in Lake County and SR 429 in Orange County. It will also contain a full interchange with the planned County Road 455 (CR 455) extension providing access to nearby Schofield Road, and a partial interchange with Valencia Parkway featuring an eastbound exit and westbound entrance ramps. The expressway would contain two 12-foot (3.7 m) travel lanes in each direction, and two 12-foot (3.7 m) shoulders on each side of the roadway in each direction. It also is planned to feature a recreational trail along the south side of the expressway that would extend from US 27 and ending its alignment with SR 516 at the CR 455 interchange. It also is going to be part of a pilot project with ASPIRE in pavement charging of electric vehicles. As part of construction, US 27 would slightly be shifted eastward in the area to avoid disruption to the Lake Louisa State Park on the western side of the roadway.

The first projects went to bid in late 2022. Construction began in May 2024 with completion estimated for 2029. It would serve as a capacity reliever to both SR 50 to the north and US 192 to the south.

Groundbreaking for segment 3 began on April 4, 2024, with a completion year of 2027. This segment runs from SR 429 to the Orange–Lake county line. Construction for segments 1 and 2 will break ground in 2026 with a completion year of 2029.

== Exit list ==
County	Location	mi	km	Exit	Destinations	Notes
Lake	Clermont	0.0	0.0	0	US 27 (SR 25) – Clermont, Haines City	Western terminus
Lake	Four Corners	2.8	4.5	2	CR 455 (County Road 455 Extension)	Located in Segment 2
Orange	Horizon West			3A	Valencia Parkway	Partial dumbbell interchange under construction; Westbound entrance and eastbound exit only; located in Segment 3
Orange	Horizon West	4.4	7.1	3B	SR 429	Eastern terminus; SR 429 exit 13A
1.000 mi = 1.609 km; 1.000 km = 0.621 mi: Incomplete access
