= Florida State Road 414 =

State highway in Florida

State Road 414
- Tolled section in green, free section in red

Route information
- Maintained by FDOT and CFX
- Length: 15.837 mi (25.487 km)
- Existed: 2009–present

Major junctions
- West end: US 441 / SR 429 in Apopka
- SR 451 in Apopka; US 441 in Lockhart; SR 434 in Altamonte Springs; I-4 in Maitland
- East end: US 17 / US 92 in Maitland

Location
- Country: United States
- State: Florida

Highway system
- Florida State Highway System; Interstate; US; State; Former; Pre‑1945; Toll; Scenic
← SR 408	→ SR 415

State Road 414 (SR 414) is a Florida state highway in Central Florida. The 15.837-mile (25.487 km) highway extends from US 441/SR 429 in Apopka to US 17/US 92 in Maitland.

The road consists of two main segments, which are separated at the road's junction with US 441 in Lockhart. The 9.38-mile (15.10 km) western segment, John Land Apopka Expressway, is a tolled controlled-access highway operated by the Central Florida Expressway Authority. The 6.46-mile (10.40 km) eastern segment, Maitland Boulevard, is an untolled arterial road operated by the Florida Department of Transportation.

== Route description ==
=== Free section ===
The free section is an expressway, with few at-grade intersections at minor roads, and interchanges at major roads. The road was once numbered State Road 426A. From east to west, the road begins at an interchange with U.S. Route 17 and U.S. Route 92 in Maitland, Florida. It then intersects County Road 427. The road then widens to six lanes briefly at the Interstate 4 Interchange, and enters the business center of Maitland Summit. The road then briefly travels through Seminole County, Florida and the city of Altamonte Springs, with an interchange with State Road 434 before ending at U.S. Highway 441 in Lockhart, Florida in Orange County, Florida. The road previously ended here prior to the opening of the toll road section further west.

=== Toll road ===
A freeway extension to the west has been built around the south side of Apopka and back to U.S. Highway 441 (SR 500) via State Road 429. During planning and construction, it was called the Apopka Bypass or the Maitland Boulevard Extension. It was named after Apopka mayor John Land in December 2005. The tollway is owned and operated by the Central Florida Expressway Authority (CFX).

Phase 1 of the toll road section runs from U.S. Highway 441 at an interchange, widens to 6 lanes west and continues west. Passing by exits with Hiawassese Road and limited access Keene Road, A Sunpass/Epass supported toll area, and an interchange with State Road 451 and State Road 429 (Western Beltway) south of Apopka. Ground broke on the project on January 19, 2007 at the southeast corner of SR 414 and US 441. Construction ran way ahead of schedule and the roadway from Exit 4 to Exit 8 was opened on February 14, 2009 for vehicles with SunPass and E-Pass transponders. Exit 6 was not included in the early opening. The entire road opened for all vehicles on May 15, 2009. On signage, the eastbound control city is Maitland and the westbound control city is Apopka.

Some of the additions and modifications in Phase 1 include:

- Nearly the entire toll road is elevated.
- The intersection of SR 414 and US 441 was shifted slightly southward and turned into a grade-separated half-folded diamond interchange. SR 414 passes over US 441. The 7-11 at the southeast corner of the interchange was demolished to accomplish this.
- The Florida Central Railroad bridge over US 441 just to the north of the intersection with State Road 414 was demolished during June 2007. Railroad tracks that had continued east to Forest City, Florida were removed. This location is the site of westbound exit and entrance ramps with US 441.
- Apopka Blvd. (CR 424) was broken where SR 414 passes through. Before construction, Apopka Blvd. ran parallel to US 441 to its west, but 20 feet (6.1 m) above US 441's grade. The north side was diverted to end at US 441 at SR 414's new westbound off ramps, with a cul-de-sac sticking out briefly to the south. The south side simply ends in a cul-de-sac.
- SR 414 is six lanes, three in each direction over the entire currently constructed distance.
- A SPUI interchange was constructed at Hiawassee Road, with SR 414 passing to the south of the recently opened Wekiva High School (Orange County Public Schools).
- A westbound off-ramp to, and an eastbound on-ramp from Keene Road has been built.
- Coral Hills Road, a side-street to the west of Clarcona Road (CR 435), was closed where SR 414 passes through and ends in cul-de-sacs on both sides. This is the location of the only mainline toll plaza in Phase 1 of SR 414.
- The mainline toll is $1.25 cash, less for those with a transponder.

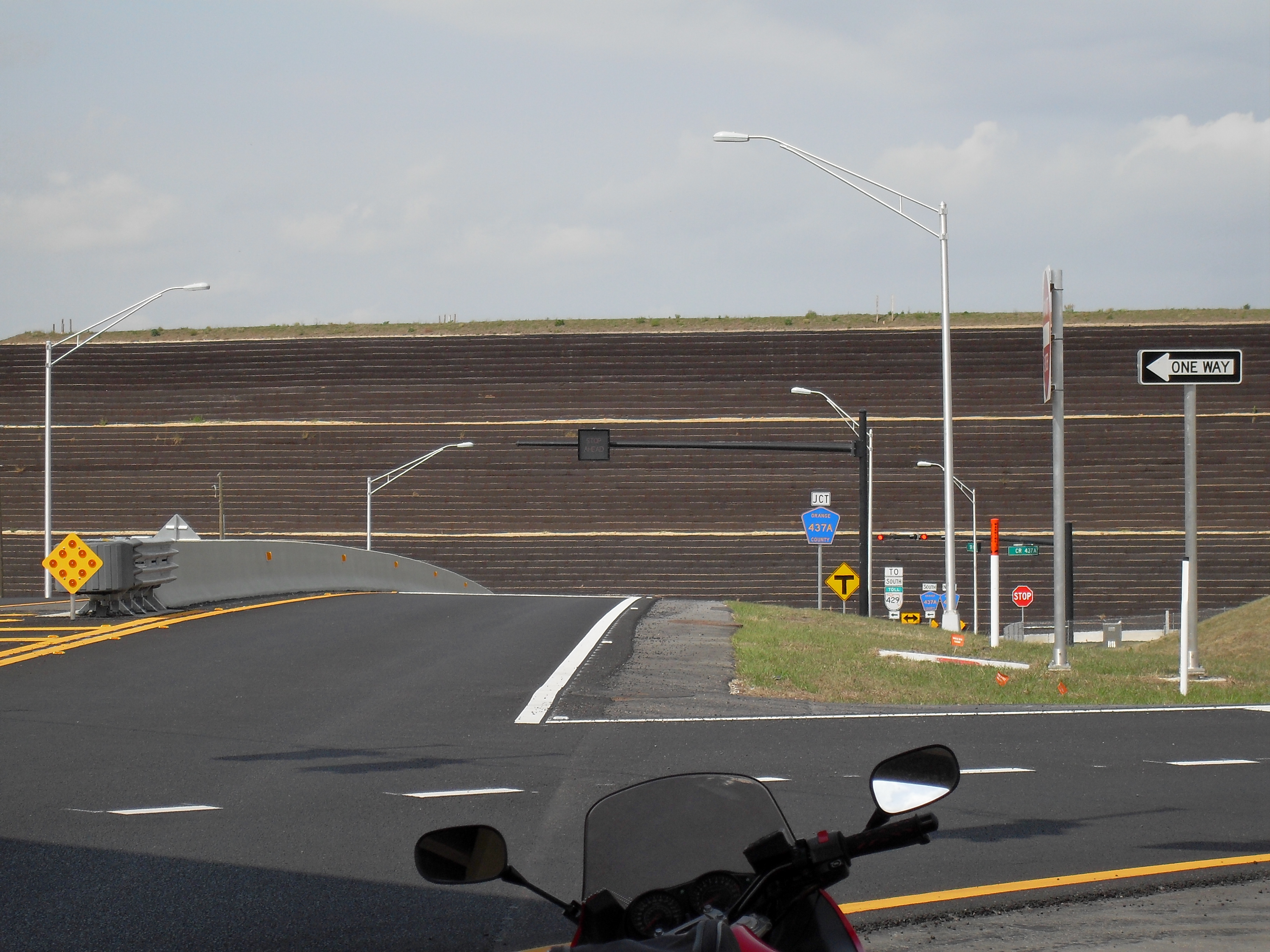
Original westbound terminus of SR 414 at CR 437A. This was replaced with an interchange with a rerouted SR 429 in 2013.

SR 414 originally ended at the interchange at SR 429. When the toll road first opened, SR 429 northbound could be accessed directly through a ramp, but SR 429 southbound required exiting onto Ocoee Apopka Road (CR 437A) and traveling 1/4 mile (0.40 km) south to an SR 429 on-ramp. Similarly, southbound traffic on SR 429 could access SR 414 directly, but northbound traffic required exiting on Ocoee Apopka Road. This arrangement remained until May 14, 2012, when the construction of SR 429's new Exit 31 fully linked the two roads.

=== Phase 2 ===
Construction on Phase 2 began with earth movement during June, 2010 at the former western terminus of SR 414 and opened on January 19, 2013. The new section is signed concurrently as both SR 414 and SR 429 and continues west and then north to an interchange a quarter-mile north of Plymouth-Sorrento Road at U.S. Route 441 where the SR 414 designation ends. A surface road has been built at that location connecting to US 441 and Plymouth-Sorrento Road. SR 414 terminates here although the road continues signed only as SR 429.

There are no exit or entrance ramps on the Phase 2 section. There are no toll facilities on the Phase 2 section however it is impossible to travel on Phase 2 without paying a toll elsewhere. Half-mile Markers correspond with SR 429 only. What was previously SR 429 north of the current SR 414 junction has been resigned as State Road 451. However, there are no direct connections from SR 451 southbound to SR 429 northbound nor from SR 429 southbound to SR 451 northbound. The road is entirely concurrent until the SR 414 designation ends at an access road for US 441. SR 429 extends further north, and will eventually reach Interstate 4 and SR 417.

Plans for further extension, eventually to meet Interstate 4 in Sanford, are part of a corridor known as the Wekiva Parkway, part of SR 429.

== Future ==
As part of an I-4 Ultimate project, SR 414 was entirely reconstructed between the I-4 interchange and Maitland Summit Boulevard. The project is effectively completed except for some final work on the pedestrian overpass.

CFX is also looking at extending the tolled section of SR 414 eastward from US 441 (Orange Blossom Trail) to SR 434, meeting the existing freeway section of SR 414. The toll lanes are proposed to be elevated above the median, while existing at-grade lanes will be maintained for local access.

== Exit list ==
County	Location	mi	km	Exit	Destinations	Notes
Orange	Apopka	0.0	0.0	–	SR 429 north	Continuation north
Orange	Apopka	0.0	0.0	34	To US 441 (Orange Blossom Trail) / CR 437 (Plymouth-Sorrento Road)	Single-point urban interchange; access via connector road; US 441 is unsigned SR 500
Orange	Apopka	3.4	5.5	30 (EB); 4A (WB)	SR 429 south – Orlando, Tampa, Ocoee, Winter Garden	Directional T interchange; eastern terminus of SR 429 overlap
Orange	Apopka	4.2	6.8	4B	SR 451 north – Apopka	Half-Y interchange; westbound exit and eastbound entrance; southern terminus of SR 451
Orange	Apopka	4.5	7.2	5	Marden Road	Half dumbbell interchange; westbound exit and eastbound entrance
Orange	Apopka	5.81	9.35	Coral Hills Mainline Plaza		
Orange	Apopka–Clarcona line	6.49	10.44	6	Keene Road	Half-Y interchange; westbound exit and eastbound entrance (tolled); to CR 435 (Clarcona Road)
Orange	Clarcona	7.93	12.76	8	Hiawassee Road	Single-point urban interchange; tolled westbound exit and eastbound entrance
Orange	Lockhart	9.38	15.10	9	US 441 (Orange Blossom Trail)	Trumpet/partial cloverleaf interchange; road is unsigned SR 500
Orange	Lockhart			Eastern end of freeway section		
Seminole	Altamonte Springs	11.80	18.99	–	SR 434 (Forest City Road) – Seminole State College	Single-point urban interchange
Seminole	Altamonte Springs	12.0	19.3	–	Gateway Drive	Westbound exit only
Orange	Maitland	12.670	20.390	–	Maitland Summit Boulevard	Diamond interchange; eastbound exit to Keller Road
Orange	Maitland	13.010	20.938	–	Keller Road to Lake Destiny Road	Half diamond interchange; westbound exit and eastbound entrance
Orange	Maitland	13.75	22.13	–	I-4 – Tampa, Daytona Beach	Cloverstack interchange; exit 90 on I-4 (SR 400)
Orange	Maitland	13.87	22.32	–	Hope Road to Wymore Road	No westbound access to Hope Road south
Orange	Maitland	15.157	24.393	–	CR 427 (Maitland Avenue)	At-grade intersection
Orange	Maitland	15.837	25.487	–	US 17 / US 92	Trumpet interchange with Orlando Avenue (also unsigned SR 15 / SR 600)
1.000 mi = 1.609 km; 1.000 km = 0.621 mi: Concurrency terminus; Electronic toll collection; Incomplete access; Route transition

== See also ==
- Central Florida Expressway Authority
