= Central Florida Expressway Authority =

Highway authority in Florida

Agency overview
- Formed: 2014
- Preceding agency: Orlando-Orange County Expressway Authority
- Type: Toll road
- Jurisdiction: Orange, Seminole, Lake, Brevard, Osceola and Polk counties
- Headquarters: Orlando, Florida
- Website: www.cfxway.com

The Central Florida Expressway Authority (CFX) is a highway authority responsible for construction, maintenance and operation of toll roads in five counties in the Greater Orlando area (specifically Lake, Orange, Osceola, Polk, Seminole, and Brevard Counties). As of May 2025, the agency operates all or part of 10 toll roads in the area, totaling 125 miles (201 km).

The authority was created in 2014 as the legal successor of the Orlando–Orange County Expressway Authority (OOCEA), which only had authority in Orange County, and it was merged with the Osceola County Expressway Authority in 2018. CFX is not the only operator in the region; other toll roads are built directly by the state government through Florida's Turnpike Enterprise.

CFX operates an electronic toll collection system known as E-PASS, one of the first systems of its kind in the United States, whose transponders are free and fully interoperable with SunPass, Peach Pass, and NC QuickPass. Since 2018, CFX also accepts E-ZPass transponders and offers its own E-ZPass-compatible transponder, Uni, for an additional charge.

== Jurisdiction ==
CFX officially defines its system as eight toll roads in the Central Florida area, with an additional road currently under construction. Tolls on any system roads are used to fund construction and maintenance projects throughout the entire system.

On some roads, CFX only has jurisdiction on certain segments; the rest of the road is controlled by Florida's Turnpike Enterprise (if tolled) or the Florida Department of Transportation (if non-tolled). The table below concerns only the CFX-controlled portions of the roads.

Number	Length (mi)	Length (km)	Southern or western terminus	Northern or eastern terminus	Local names	Formed	Removed	Notes
SR 408	21.06	33.89	SR 50 in Ocoee	SR 50 in Alafaya	Spessard L. Holland East–West Expressway	1973	current	SR 408 continues 0.89 mi (1.43 km) west to Florida's Turnpike under FTE
SR 414	9.38	15.10	SR 429/US 441 in Apopka	US 441 in Lockhart	John Land Apopka Expressway	2009	current	Concurrent with SR 429 for 3.4 mi (5.5 km); SR 414 continues 6.46 mi (10.40 km) east without tolls to US 17/US 92
SR 417	31.47	50.65	World Center Drive in Lake Buena Vista	Orange/Seminole county line in Bertha	Central Florida GreeneWay	1988	current	SR 417 continues 5.10 mi (8.21 km) west and 16.41 mi (26.41 km) northwest under FTE; both segments end at I-4
SR 429	30.79	49.55	Seidel Road in Horizon West	CR 435 near Mount Plymouth	Daniel Webster Western Beltway / Wekiva Parkway (Note: SR 429 is known as Wekiva Parkway north of US 441 and Western Beltway south of it)	2000	current	SR 429 continues 9.84 mi (15.84 km) south under FTE and 12.98 mi (20.89 km) northeast under FDOT; both segments end at I-4
SR 451	1.87	3.01	SR 414 in Apopka	US 441 in Apopka		2013	current	Originally built as a segment of SR 429
SR 452	1.6	2.6	SR 417 in Sanford	Lake Mary Boulevard and Red Cleveland Boulevard in Sanford	Seminole Connector	proposed	—	Proposed two-lane connector to the Orlando-Sanford International Airport; scheduled to begin construction in 2031
SR 453	3.36	5.41	SR 429 in Apopka	SR 46 in Mount Dora	Mount Dora Connector	2018	current	
SR 516	4.4	7.1	US 27 in Clermont	SR 429 in Horizon West	Lake/Orange Expressway	proposed	—	Completion estimated for 2029
SR 528	22.70	36.53	SR 482 in Belle Isle	SR 520 in eastern Orange County	Martin Andersen Beachline Expressway (Note: formerly Bee Line Expressway)	1974	current	SR 528 continues 8.14 mi (13.10 km) west to I-4 under FTE and 22.66 mi (36.47 km) east without tolls to SR A1A
SR 538	7.22	11.62	Polk/Osceola county line in Loughman	CR 580 in Poinciana	Poinciana Parkway	1974	current	Road continues north without tolls to US 17/US 92
Proposed and unbuilt

=== Non-system ===
In addition to the above tollways, CFX operates toll plazas on two "non-system" roads. These roads are managed under special agreements with a local governmental body, and tolls collected on them only fund the specific road.

Number	Length (mi)	Length (km)	Southern or western terminus	Northern or eastern terminus	Local names	Formed	Removed	Notes
SR 551	2.5	4.0	SR 528 in Orlando	SR 15 in Orlando	Goldenrod Road Extension	2003	current	Unsigned; SR 551 continues 8.79 mi (14.15 km) north without tolls to SR 426
CR 522	6.2	10.0	SR 417 in Celebration	US 17/US 92 in Kissimmee	Osceola Parkway	1995	current	CFX operates tolls on Osceola Parkway (Note: CFX operates a mainline toll plaza at Shingle Creek and a toll booth at the on-ramp connecting SR 417 to Osceola Parkway) on behalf of Osceola County; road continues in both directions without tolls

== History ==
CFX was founded in 1963 for the purpose of building the Bee Line Expressway, and soon built the East-West Expressway.

Many sections of the current expressway system, such as the connection of SR 528 from Sand Lake Road to I-4, the sections of SR 417 in Seminole and Osceola counties, and SR 429 south of Seidel Road, were built by the Florida's Turnpike Enterprise, and their toll facilities are managed by the same.

Beginning in 2007, CFX began transitioning its signage from FHWA Series E modified typeface to signs that use the new Clearview typeface.

The newest addition to the CFX system is an extension of Maitland Boulevard (State Road 414) known as the John Land Apopka Expressway. The expressway opened on May 15, 2009. The project was inherited from the Florida Department of Transportation, which referred to it as the "Apopka Bypass". Planning is also underway for an extension of State Road 429 known as the Wekiva Parkway. In addition, SR 408 underwent a massive overhaul, including the relocation of its two main toll plazas, large sections of widening, and expansion of a bridge over Lake Underhill.

In 2010, CFX was attempting to keep the average toll to $0.11 per mile.

The current 25-year plan, the "2040 Master Plan", was approved in May 2016. Included are two new toll connections to Brevard County (including an extension of SR 408), a southern bypass of SR 417 to Florida's Turnpike south of St. Cloud, a connection bypassing the three remaining signalized intersections on SR 414, and a connection from the Western Beltway to U.S. Highway 27 south of Clermont.

A 2013 grand jury investigation into the CFX, found a "culture of corruption," involving gifts and campaign donations. CFX was criticized for firing the Director who was attempting to stop this corruption, replacing him with a legislator with no experience of running a toll operation. The job paid over $175,000 annually.

=== Canceled projects ===
The Central Connector, known by the Florida Department of Transportation as State Road 529 (SR 529), was a proposed tollway planned to parallel Orange Avenue (SR 527) between downtown Orlando and the Beachline Expressway. The project was canceled in 1991 after much local opposition.
