= Lake Hancock (Orange County, Florida) =

Coordinates: 28.46009°N 81.61263°W

- Location within Florida Location within the United States
- Location: Orange County, Florida
- Type: Natural freshwater lake
- Basin countries: United States
- Max. length: 2.09 mi (3.36 km)
- Max. width: 0.61 mi (0.98 km)
- Surface area: 481 acres (195 ha)
- Surface elevation: ca. 100 ft (30 m)

Lake Hancock is a swampy natural freshwater lake on the west side of Orlando, Florida, in Orange County, Florida, United States. This lake is long and winding. To the west side of the lake is Florida State Road 429, a toll highway. Residential housing surrounds all but the east end of the lake.

This lake has no public boat docks nor public swimming areas. There is no public access to this lake.
