= Lake Hartley =

Lake in Florida, United States

- Location within Florida
- Location: Orange County, Florida
- Coordinates: 28.476538°N 81.6205001°W
- Type: Natural freshwater lake
- Basin countries: United States
- Max. length: (Note: This lake has such an irregular shape that assigning a length and width to it would be meaningless.)
- Surface area: 54.34 acres (21.99 ha)
- Surface elevation: ca. 95 ft (29 m)
- Islands: 1 islet

Lake Hartley is a natural freshwater lake on the west side of Orlando, Florida, in Orange County, Florida. This lake, with some swampy shore areas, is long and winding. To the west side of the lake is Florida State Road 429, a toll highway. Residential housing, a private school and a retail area border parts of the lake. Citrus groves also border parts of it. The entire lake is surrounded by private property, so there is no public access to this lake.
