= Florida's Turnpike Enterprise =

State-owned enterprise operating toll roads in Florida

Agency overview
- Formed: April 11, 2002
- Preceding agency: Florida State Turnpike Authority (1957–1969)
- Type: Toll road
- Jurisdiction: State of Florida
- Headquarters: Ocoee, Florida
- Agency executive: Nicola Liquori
- Parent agency: Florida Department of Transportation
- Website: floridasturnpike.com

Florida's Turnpike Enterprise (FTE) is a unit of the Florida Department of Transportation that operates toll roads in Florida. The current executive director is Nicola Liquori.

== History ==
The Florida State Turnpike Authority was authorized by the Florida Legislature and signed into law by Gov. Dan McCarty as the Turnpike Authority Act on June 11, 1953. The Authority was reorganized and incorporated into the newly formed Florida Department of Transportation (FDOT) in July 1969. The Turnpike's functions became part of the FDOT pursuant to the reorganization of the State Government Act. At that time, individual FDOT Districts managed the Turnpike work program, operations, and maintenance in their areas. In 1988, the Florida Legislature created the Office of Florida's Turnpike.

In 1990, the Legislature passed Senate Bill 1316, authorizing the expansion of Florida's Turnpike to include construction of non-contiguous road projects as an alternative to assist in meeting the state's backlog of needed highway facilities. The Legislature set environmental and financial feasibility standards, authorized toll increases on the existing system, and allowed higher rate per mile tolls on the new projects through Chapter 339.2275(3) of the Florida Statutes. The Legislature approved expansion projects and new interchanges subject to verification of economic feasibility, determination that the projects are consistent, to the maximum extent feasible, with approved local government comprehensive plans were projects are located, and completion of a statement of the project's significant environmental impacts. Fifty road projects were submitted for consideration and, ultimately, ten new roads were identified for possible construction, subject to meeting the feasibility requirements, and 15 new interchanges.

On April 11, 2002, Gov. Jeb Bush signed House Bill 261, creating Florida's Turnpike Enterprise, and directing the Turnpike to pursue innovation and best private-sector business practices, to improve cost-effectiveness and timeliness in project delivery, to increase revenues and expand its capital program, and to improve quality of service to its customers. At that time, the Office of Toll Operations, formerly a separate division of the State of Florida, was folded into the FTE and is exempt from FDOT policies, procedures, and standards, subject to the secretary having the authority to apply any such policies, procedures, and standards to the FTE from time to time as deemed appropriate.

== Jurisdiction ==
=== Florida's Turnpike System ===
Florida's Turnpike System consists of the Turnpike mainline and eleven other highways for a total length of 515 miles (829 km). Roads in the system are operated directly by FTE, and tolls collected on system roads fund the entire system. On some roads, FTE only has jurisdiction on certain segments; the table below concerns only the FTE-controlled portions of the roads.

Number	Length (mi)	Length (km)	Southern or western terminus	Northern or eastern terminus	Local names	Formed	Removed	Notes
Florida's Turnpike	264.67	425.95	I-95/SR 826/US 441 in Miami Gardens	I-75 near Wildwood	Ronald Reagan Turnpike	1957	current	Officially designated as SR 91
Florida's Turnpike Extension	47.86	77.02	US 1 in Florida City	Florida's Turnpike in Miramar	Homestead Extension	1973	current	Officially designated as SR 821
SR 23	33.6	54.1	US 17 near Green Cove Springs	I-10/US 90 in Jacksonville	First Coast Expressway	2004	current	13 mi (21 km) extension to I-95 proposed
SR 281	7.09	11.41	US 98 in Midway	CR 191 in Garcon Point	Garcon Point Bridge	1999 (Note: transferred from Santa Rosa Bay Bridge Authority to FDOT in 2022 and added to the Turnpike system in 2024)	current	SR 281 continues 8.88 mi (14.29 km) north to US 90
SR 407	6.80	10.94	SR 528 near Port St. John	SR 405 in Titusville	Challenger Memorial Parkway	1972	current	Untolled; operated by FTE as a segment of Beachline East Expressway (SR 528)
SR 417	22.59 (Note: FTE operates a 17.49 mi (28.15 km) northern segment and a 5.10 mi (8.21 km) southern segment of SR 417)	36.36	N: Orange/Seminole county line in Bertha; S: I-4 in Four Corners	N: I-4/SR 417 in Sanford; S: World Center Drive in Lake Buena Vista	N: Seminole County Expressway; S: Southern Connector Extension	1988	current	FTE operates two discontinuous segments; CFX operates a 31.47 mi (50.65 km) segment between them
SR 429	9.84	15.84	I-4 in Four Corners	Seidel Road in Horizon West	Daniel Webster Western Beltway	2000	current	SR 429 continues 43.77 mi (70.44 km) north to I-4 with segments under CFX and FDOT
SR 528	23.25 (Note: FTE operates a 8.14 mi (13.10 km) western segment and a 15.11 mi (24.32 km) eastern segment of SR 528)	37.42	W: I-4 in Orlando; E: SR 520 in eastern Orange County	W: SR 482 in Belle Isle; E: US 1/SR A1A in Cocoa	Beachline West Expressway / Beachline East Expressway	1973	current	FTE operates two discontinuous segments; CFX operates a 22.70 mi (36.53 km) segment between them; eastern segment is untolled; SR 528 continues 7.54 mi (12.13 km) concurrent with SR A1A
SR 568	3.04	4.89	SR 589 in Northdale	SR 597 in Cheval	Veterans Expressway	1994	current	Originally built as a segment of SR 589
SR 570	24.38	39.24	I-4 in Lakeland	I-4 in Polk City	Polk Parkway	1999	current	
SR 570B	6.50	10.46	SR 570 near Auburndale	US 17/SR 35 in Bartow	Central Polk Parkway	proposed	—	Completion estimated for 2029; multi-phase extension to I-4 proposed
SR 589	68.0	109.4	I-275 in Tampa	SR 44 in Lecanto	Veterans Expressway / Suncoast Parkway (Note: SR 589 is known as Suncoast Parkway north of SR 568 and Veterans Expressway south of it)	1994	current	Multi-phase 13 mi (21 km) extension to US 19/US 98 in Red Level proposed
SR 869	21.24	34.18	I-75/I-595 in Sunrise	Florida's Turnpike in Coconut Creek	Sawgrass Expressway	1986	current	SR 869 continues 2.75 mi (4.43 km) east without tolls to I-95 in Deerfield Beach
I-4/Selmon Expressway Connector	2.01	3.2	Selmon Expressway (SR 618) in Tampa	I-4 in Tampa	I-4/Selmon Expressway Connector	2014	current	The Selmon Expressway proper is operated by THEA
Proposed and unbuilt

=== Non-system ===
In addition to the System, FTE operates toll facilities on roads and bridges that are owned or operated by the Florida Department of Transportation (FDOT). FTE does not manage the road proper, and tolls collected on these roads only fund the respective road.

Number	Length (mi)	Length (km)	Southern or western terminus	Northern or eastern terminus	Local names	Formed	Removed	Notes
I-75	77.79	125.19	CR 951 near Golden Gate	US 27 in Weston	Alligator Alley (Note: Originally named Everglades Parkway)	1968	current	Previously designated SR 84
I-275	4.14	6.66	US 19 near Terra Ceia	Pinellas Point Drive in St. Petersburg	Sunshine Skyway Bridge	1987	current	
SR 293	15.4	24.8	US 98 in Destin	SR 85 in Niceville	Walter Francis Spence Parkway / Mid-Bay Bridge / Danny Wuerffel Way	1993	current	SR 293 is operated by FDOT on behalf of the Mid-Bay Bridge Authority
SR 429	12.98	20.89	CR 435 near Mount Plymouth	I-4/SR 417 in Sanford	Wekiva Parkway	2022	current	SR 429 continues 40.63 mi (65.39 km) south to I-4 with segments under CFX and the Turnpike System
SR 679	9.96	16.03	Anderson Boulevard in Fort De Soto Park	SR 682 in St. Petersburg	Pinellas Bayway / Fort De Soto Recreation Trail	1962	current	Part of the Pinellas Bayway System
SR 682	3.72	5.99	SR 699 in St. Pete Beach	US 19 in St. Petersburg	Bayway Trail	1962	current	Part of the Pinellas Bayway System; previously designated SR A19A
SR 686A	1.44	2.32	CR 611 in Largo	SR 690 in Pinellas Park	Gateway Expressway	2024	current	Express lanes for non-toll SR 686
SR 690	3.1	5.0	US 19 in Pinellas Park	I-275 in St. Petersburg	Gateway Expressway	2024	current	

== See also ==
- SunPass, an electronic toll collection system operated by FTE
