= Lake Roberts (Winter Garden, Florida) =

- Location within Florida
- Location: Winter Garden, Florida
- Coordinates: 28.5179122°N 81.5708685°W
- Type: Natural freshwater lake
- Basin countries: United States
- Max. length: 3,150 ft (960 m)
- Max. width: 1,875 ft (572 m)
- Surface area: 116 acres (47 ha)
- Average depth: 15 ft (4.6 m)
- Water volume: 582,100,992 US gal (2.20349195×10^{9} L; 484,700,469 imp gal)
- Surface elevation: ca. 108 ft (33 m)

Lake Roberts, just south of Florida State Road 429, is a natural freshwater lake on the west side of Orlando, Florida, in Orange County, Florida. This lake is almost entirely surrounded by residential housing. It has a swampy area on its northeast and the only public access is along a short stretch of McKinnon Road that runs along a very small part of the southeast shore of the lake. As that stretch is brushy it would probably even be unsuitable for fishing.
