= Hickorynut Lake =

Coordinates: 28.42696°N 81.64430°W

- Location within Florida
- Location: Orange County, Florida
- Type: Natural freshwater lake
- Basin countries: United States
- Max. length: (Note: Providing a set length and width for this lake is not feasible, as it has a very irregular shape and parts of it are so shallow as to be dry much of the time.)
- Surface area: 417 acres (169 ha)
- Max. depth: 20 ft (6.1 m)
- Surface elevation: 95 ft (29 m)
- Islands: Various islands and islets

Hickorynut Lake, also known sometimes as Little Hickorynut, is a natural freshwater lake on the northwest side of Walt Disney World, in Orange County, Florida. This lake has an irregular shape and much of it is surrounded by land that floods easily. On the east side of the lake is Florida State Road 429, a toll highway. Some residential areas are now bordering it.

This lake has no public boat docks, no public swimming areas and only a little public access from two roads that border it.
