= Lake Ingram =

Coordinates: 28.46137°N 81.64327°W

- Location within Florida
- Location: Orange County, Florida
- Type: Natural freshwater lake
- Basin countries: United States
- Max. length: 2,400 ft (730 m)
- Max. width: 1,160 ft (350 m)
- Surface area: 42.57 acres (17.23 ha)
- Average depth: 9 ft (2.7 m)
- Water volume: 128,906,825 US gal (487,965,410 L; 107,337,385 imp gal)
- Surface elevation: 92 ft (28 m)

Lake Ingram, also sometimes spelled as Inghram, is a natural freshwater lake on the west side of Orlando, in Orange County, Florida, United States. This lake is shaped like an arrowhead and much of it is surrounded by land that floods easily. To the east side of the lake is Florida State Road 429, a toll highway. Some residential areas are now bordering it.

This lake has no public boat docks, no public swimming areas, and only a little public access from Avalon Road, which borders its eastern tip.
