= Florida State Road 453 =

State highway in Florida, United States

State Road 453
- SR 453 highlighted in red

Route information
- Maintained by CFX
- Length: 3.36 mi (5.41 km)
- Existed: March 31, 2018–present

Major junctions
- South end: SR 429 in Apopka
- North end: SR 46 near Mount Dora

Location
- Country: United States
- State: Florida
- Counties: Orange, Lake

Highway system
- Florida State Highway System; Interstate; US; State; Former; Pre‑1945; Toll; Scenic
← SR 451	→ SR 464

State Road 453 (SR 453), part of the Wekiva Parkway system, is a controlled-access toll road built and maintained by the Central Florida Expressway Authority (CFX). SR 453 connects SR 429 to SR 46, and it opened on March 31, 2018.

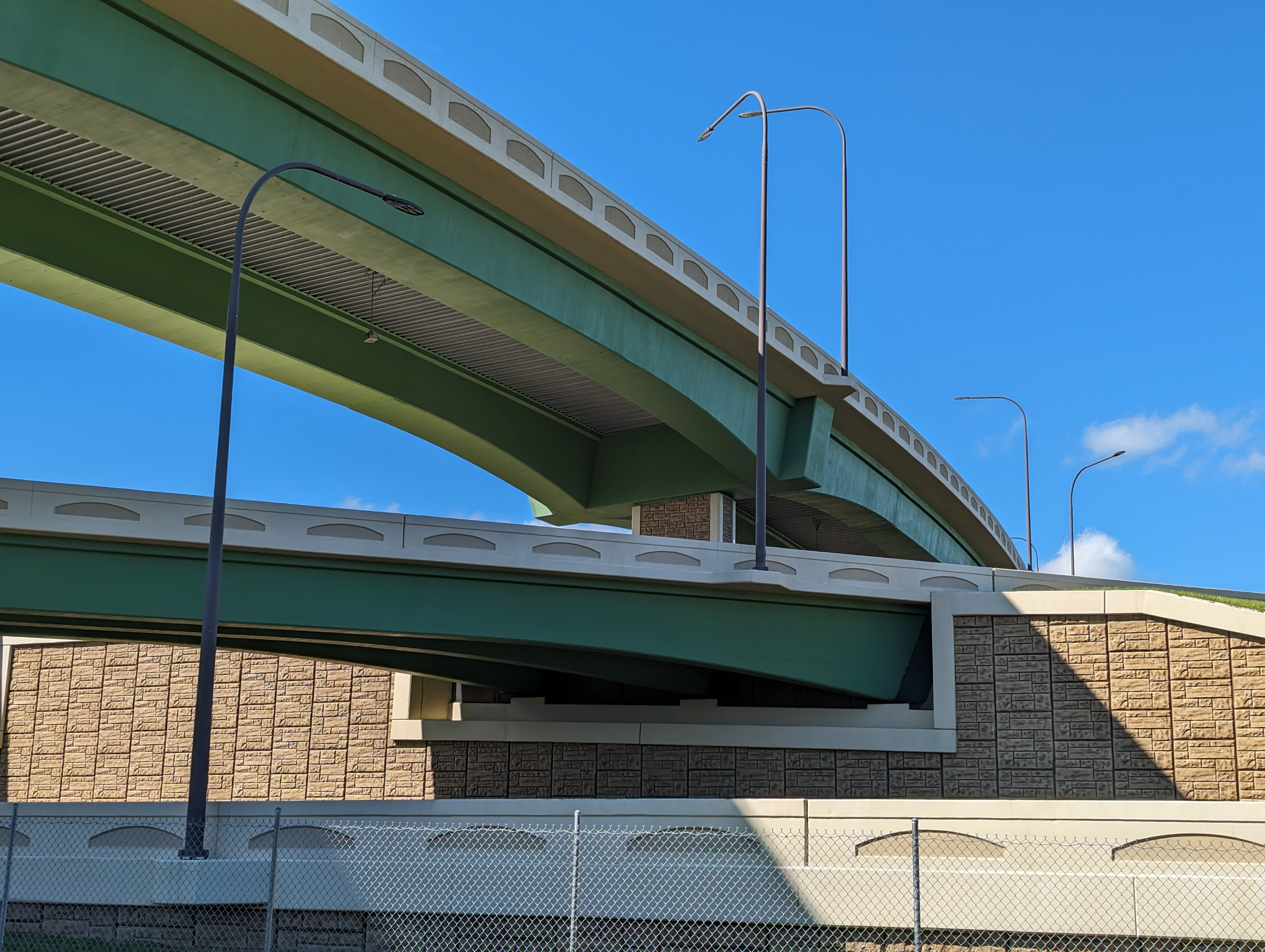
Florida State Road 453 & Florida State Road 429 flyover ramps from Ondich Road

== Route description ==
SR 453 heads northwest–southeast from exit 39 on SR 429 to a loop interchange with SR 46 near Mount Dora as a spur route of SR 429. There is a toll plaza between the Lake County line and the SR 46 interchange. There are no planned intermediate exits.

== History ==
SR 453 opened on March 31, 2018.

== Exit list ==
All exits are unnumbered.

County	Location	mi	km	Destinations	Notes
Orange	Apopka	0.00	0.00	SR 429 – Sanford, Daytona Beach, Orlando, Tampa	Directional T interchange; exit 39 on SR 429 (Wekiva Parkway)
Lake	Mount Dora	2.34	3.77	Coronado Mainline Toll Gantry	
Lake	Mount Dora	3.36	5.41	SR 46 west / Sorrento Avenue east – Mount Dora, Leesburg, Sorrento, Mount Plymouth	Partial trumpet interchange; at-grade intersection
1.000 mi = 1.609 km; 1.000 km = 0.621 mi: Electronic toll collection

== See also ==
- Central Florida Expressway Authority
- Florida State Road 429
