= Florida State Road 451 =

Highway in Florida

State Road 451
- SR 451 highlighted in red

Route information
- Maintained by CFX
- Length: 1.868 mi (3.006 km)
- Existed: 2013–present

Major junctions
- South end: SR 414 / SR 429 in Apopka
- North end: US 441 in Apopka

Location
- Country: United States
- State: Florida
- Counties: Orange

Highway system
- Florida State Highway System; Interstate; US; State; Former; Pre‑1945; Toll; Scenic
← SR 442	→ SR 453

State Road 451 (SR 451) is a 1.9-mile (3.1 km) controlled-access toll road connecting SR 414 (Apopka Expressway) and SR 429 (Western Expressway) north to US 441 (SR 500/Orange Blossom Trail). The entire route is within Apopka.

== Route description ==
The route begins at a large interchange with SR 414 and SR 429, continuing 2 miles (3.2 km) as a north-south route. The highway then has an at-grade intersection with U.S. Route 441 (US 441; Orange Blossom Trail). The highway then continues 0.85 miles (1.37 km) with no intermediate interchanges to its northern terminus an at-grade intersection with Old Dixie Highway. The highway then continues north as Vick Road.

The shortest numbered route within the CFX system, SR 451 is effectively a spur route of SR 429. While the short SR 451 itself has no toll facilities, it is not possible to drive the route (excluding the Vick Road Extension) without paying tolls either on SR 414 or SR 429.

== History ==
The route now designated as SR 451 was formerly SR 429. To allow the extension of SR 429 to its new terminus on US 441 as part of the Wekiva Parkway project, the road now known as SR 451 had to be given a new designation. The road originally would have been designated SR 429A, but it was changed to FL 451 in 2005. In 2012, OOCEA (predecessor to CFX) announced the new designation, which took effect in January 2013.

== Exit list ==
The entire route is in Apopka, Orange County.

mi	km	Destinations	Notes
0.000	0.000	SR 414 east / SR 429 south – Maitland, Orlando, Tampa, Ocoee, Winter Garden	Interchange; exit 30 on SR 429 (Western Beltway); exit 4B on SR 414 (Apopka Expressway)
1.868	3.006	US 441 (Orange Blossom Trail) / Vick Road north – Apopka	At-grade intersection; US 441 is unsigned SR 500; to AdventHealth Apopka
1.000 mi = 1.609 km; 1.000 km = 0.621 mi

== See also ==
- Central Florida Expressway Authority
