= Loughman, Florida =

- Census-designated place
- Location in Polk County and the state of Florida
- Coordinates: 28°14′43″N 81°34′32″W
- Country: United States
- State: Florida
- County: Polk

Area
  - Total: 3.76 sq mi (9.73 km^{2})
  - Land: 3.47 sq mi (9.00 km^{2})
  - Water: 0.28 sq mi (0.73 km^{2})
- Elevation: 118 ft (36 m)

Population (2020)
  - Total: 5,417
  - Density: 1,559.3/sq mi (602.06/km^{2})
- Time zone: UTC-5 (Eastern (EST))
  - Summer (DST): UTC-4 (EDT)
- ZIP code: 33858
- Area code: 863
- FIPS code: 12-41400
- GNIS feature ID: 2403242

Loughman (LOFF-mǝn) is a census-designated place (CDP) in the northeast corner of Polk County, Florida, United States, near the Osceola county line. As of the 2020 census, Loughman had a population of 5,417. It is part of the Lakeland–Winter Haven Metropolitan Statistical Area. This area has grown rapidly since 2000 due, in large part, to its proximity to Walt Disney World and the Orlando, Florida area.

== Geography ==
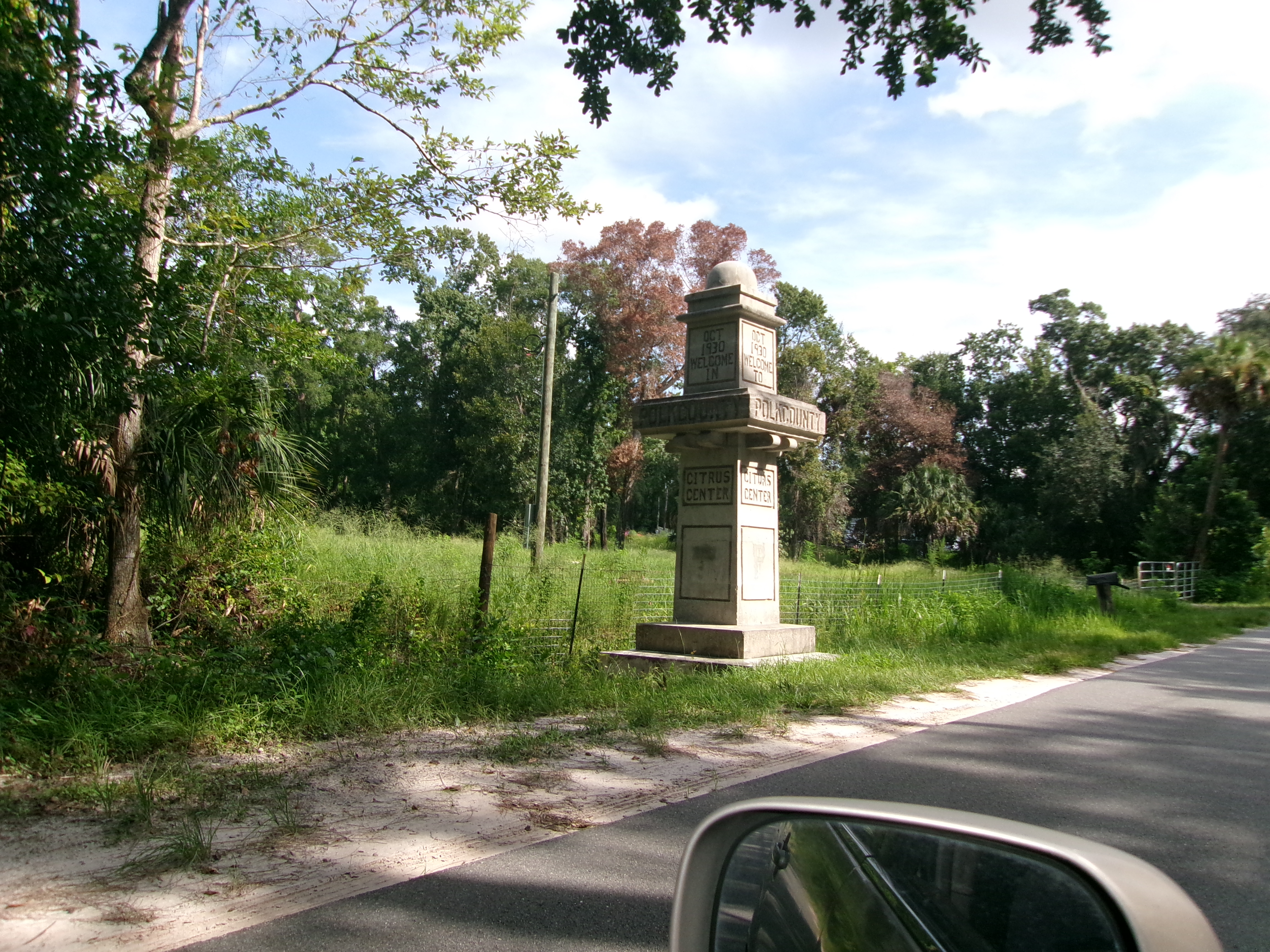
Loughman Polk County Welcome Monument-01

According to the United States Census Bureau, the CDP has a total area of 3.8 square miles (9.8 km^{2}), of which 3.7 square miles (9.6 km^{2}) is land and 0.1 square miles (0.26 km^{2}) (1.33%) is water.

== History ==
Loughman was settled shortly after the South Florida Railroad reached the area in 1883. The place was originally named Lake Locke.

Loughman was on the route of the Dixie Highway, which ran parallel to the line of US 17/92 and was renamed Old Kissimmee Road (although it is named Old Tampa Highway north of the Osceola County line). A monument dated 1930 marks the Polk county line. Nearby, some of the brick-paved highway remains.

== Demographics ==
Historical population
Census	Pop.	Note	%±
2020	5,417		—
US Decennial Census

=== 2020 census ===
As of the 2020 census, Loughman had a population of 5,417. The median age was 32.5 years. 20.1% of residents were under the age of 18 and 9.0% of residents were 65 years of age or older. For every 100 females there were 88.9 males, and for every 100 females age 18 and over there were 87.2 males age 18 and over.

96.3% of residents lived in urban areas, while 3.7% lived in rural areas.

There were 2,008 households in Loughman, of which 32.8% had children under the age of 18 living in them. Of all households, 41.5% were married-couple households, 18.1% were households with a male householder and no spouse or partner present, and 29.1% were households with a female householder and no spouse or partner present. About 20.5% of all households were made up of individuals and 5.2% had someone living alone who was 65 years of age or older.

There were 2,624 housing units, of which 23.5% were vacant. The homeowner vacancy rate was 7.1% and the rental vacancy rate was 13.7%.

Racial composition as of the 2020 census
Race	Number	Percent
White	2,847	52.6%
Black or African American	581	10.7%
American Indian and Alaska Native	34	0.6%
Asian	128	2.4%
Native Hawaiian and Other Pacific Islander	0	0.0%
Some other race	814	15.0%
Two or more races	1,013	18.7%
Hispanic or Latino (of any race)	2,147	39.6%

=== 2000 census ===
As of the 2000 census, there were 1,385 people, 546 households, and 369 families residing in the CDP. The population density was 372.0 inhabitants per square mile (143.6/km^{2}). There were 1,088 housing units at an average density of 292.2 per square mile (112.8/km^{2}). The racial makeup of the CDP was 80.65% White, 13.14% African American, 0.07% Native American, 0.51% Asian, 3.83% from other races, and 1.81% from two or more races. Hispanic or Latino of any race were 10.47% of the population.

There were 546 households, out of which 25.6% had children under the age of 18 living with them, 52.9% were married couples living together, 10.4% had a female householder with no husband present, and 32.4% were non-families. 23.8% of all households were made up of individuals, and 6.8% had someone living alone who was 65 years of age or older. The average household size was 2.54 and the average family size was 3.00.

In the CDP, the population was spread out, with 23.7% under the age of 18, 7.1% from 18 to 24, 29.5% from 25 to 44, 23.6% from 45 to 64, and 16.0% who were 65 years of age or older. The median age was 38 years. For every 100 females, there were 96.2 males. For every 100 females age 18 and over, there were 100.6 males.

The median income for a household in the CDP was $31,445, and the median income for a family was $34,063. Males had a median income of $20,160 versus $15,565 for females. The per capita income for the CDP was $14,205. About 14.0% of families and 18.0% of the population were below the poverty line, including 39.0% of those under age 18 and 6.6% of those age 65 or over.

== Transportation ==
Loughman is on U.S. Highway 17/92, at the junction with Poinciana Parkway (opened in 2016) and Ronald Reagan Parkway (County Road 54).

Bus service is provided by Citrus Connection from Loughman to Posner Park (with connections to Haines City and Four Corners).
