= SunPass =

Electronic toll collection system in Florida, United States

- Industry: Electronic toll collection
- Founded: April 24, 1999; 27 years ago
- Headquarters: Boca Raton, Florida, United States
- Area served: Delaware; Florida; Georgia; Illinois; Indiana; Kentucky; Maine; Maryland; Massachusetts; Minnesota; New Hampshire; New Jersey; New York; North Carolina; Ohio; Pennsylvania; Texas; Rhode Island; Virginia; Michigan; Colorado; West Virginia
- Products: Transponders
- Owner: Florida's Turnpike Enterprise
- Website: sunpass.com

SunPass is an electronic toll collection system within the state of Florida, United States. It was created in 1999 by the Florida Department of Transportation's (FDOT's) Office of Toll Operations, which operates as a division of Florida's Turnpike Enterprise (FTE). The system utilizes windshield-mounted RFID transponders manufactured by TransCore and lane equipment designed by companies including TransCore, SAIC, and Raytheon.

== History ==
SunPass was introduced on April 24, 1999, and by October 1 of the same year, more than 100,000 SunPass transponders had been sold.

In early 2009, all Easy Pay customers automatically became SunPass Plus customers if they opt-in and have the privilege of using their transponders to pay for airport parking at Tampa, Orlando, Palm Beach, Fort Lauderdale and Miami airports. Customers could also opt out of the program.

== Functionality ==
The Mini was introduced on July 1, 2008, and became available at retail locations. The Mini is a RFID passive transponder, about the size of a credit card, and uses no batteries. The transponder must be mounted on the vehicle's windshield to work properly and cannot be removed from the windshield without destroying the pass. The SunPass Mini sticker will not work on motorcycle windshields as they are not made of glass.

SunPass Portable (or SunPass Pro) transponders can be transferred between vehicles.

=== Technology ===
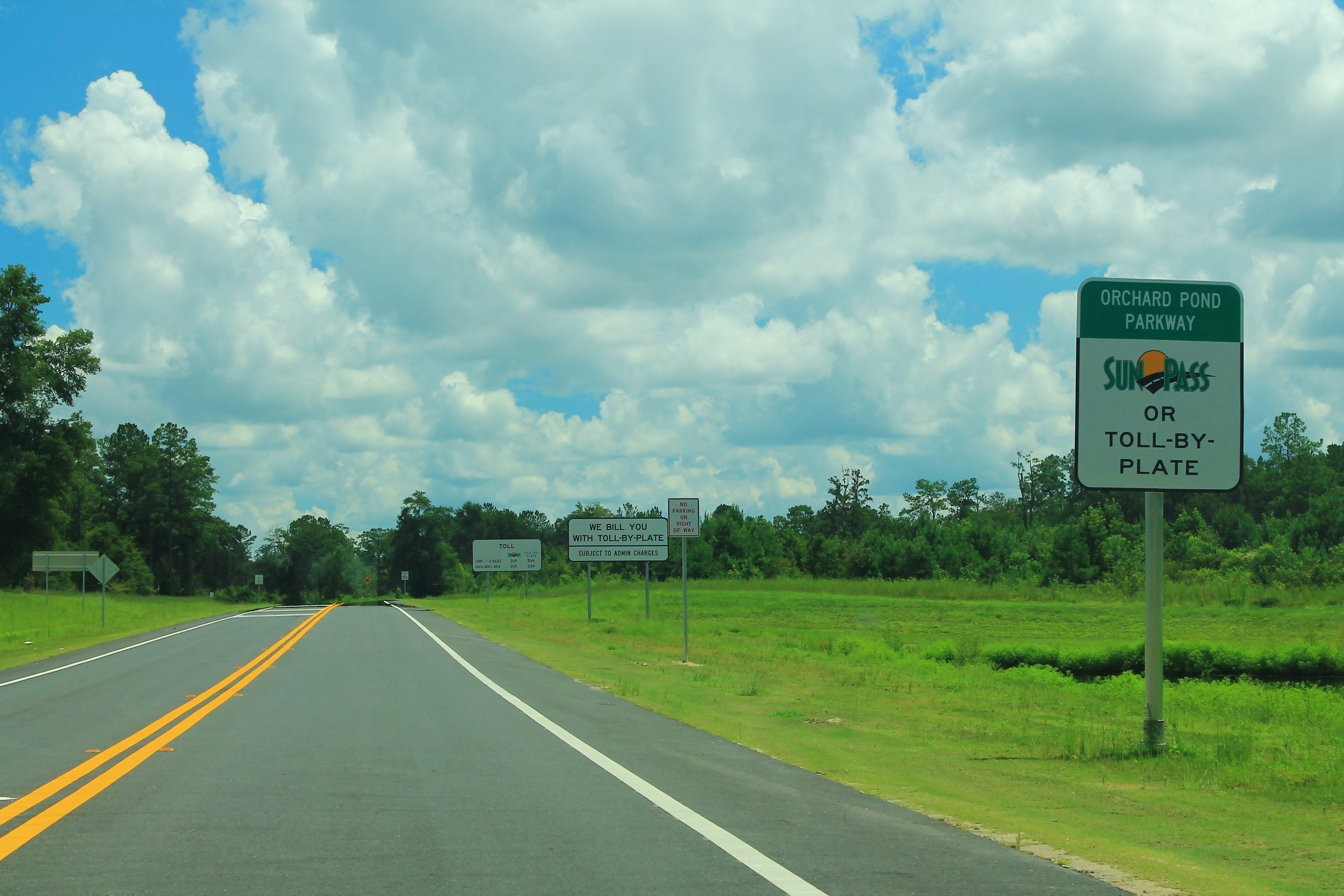
Signs on Orchard Pond Parkway near Tallahassee indicate payment is only by SunPass or toll-by-plate.

SunPass-only toll lanes on most toll roads in Florida allow a vehicle to proceed through the tollbooth at speeds of up to 25 mph (40 km/h) as a safety precaution. The Turnpike utilizes all-electronic tolling (AET) and toll-by-plate, which handle highway speeds. The mainline toll barriers have dedicated lanes capable of full-speed automatic toll collection at up to 65 mph (105 km/h).

Florida's Turnpike Enterprise converted the Homestead Extension of Florida's Turnpike, the Sawgrass Expressway, and the Veterans Expressway to open road tolling, utilizing the SunPass transponders, in September 2010, February 2011, April 2014, and June 2014, respectively, ceasing cash collection. This allows free-flowing movement on both toll roads, with vehicles passing through toll gantries at the former toll plazas. Motorists without a SunPass are billed through toll by plate. Toll-by-Plate uses cameras and sends a bill to the registered owner of the vehicle. The bill consists of the toll and an administrative fee. If the person fails to pay the toll and accompanying fees at all, the person would be fined $100 plus the tolls owed; in some cases, court costs, points against the driver's license, and the suspension of the license and registration would also be levied.

== Interoperability ==
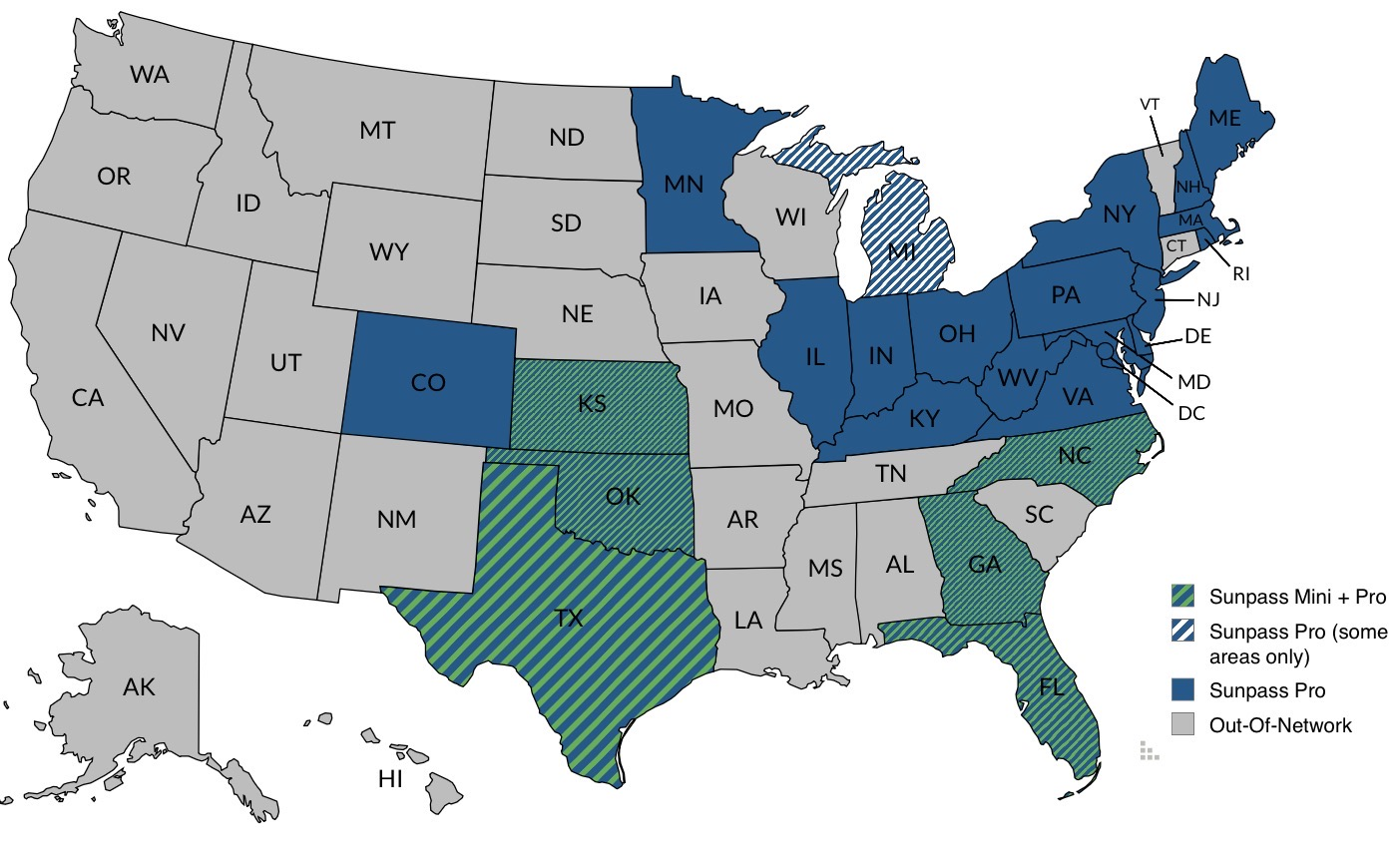
Compatibility of the SunPass throughout the US. SunPass Pro transponders only Works in Colorado except Northwest Parkway. Works in parts of Michigan (Bay City). SunPass Mini and Pro transponders (Blue + Green)

SunPass is fully interoperable with E-Pass (from the Central Florida Expressway Authority), O-Pass (from Osceola County, which has been folded into E-Pass), LeeWay (from Lee County toll bridges), and the Miami-Dade Expressway Authority (MDX) toll roads.

SunPass, like other electronic toll collection (ETC) systems in Florida, was not initially compatible with systems outside of Florida. The federal transportation bill, Moving Ahead for Progress in the 21st Century Act (MAP-21), adopted in July 2012, required all toll facilities to have interoperable road tolling systems by October 1, 2016. SunPass announced in 2012 for plans to become interoperable with E-ZPass. The older battery-powered SunPass transponders were phased out by the end of 2015; new batteryless models can work with tolling equipment in other states.

On July 29, 2013, Florida's Turnpike Enterprise entered into an interoperability agreement with the North Carolina Turnpike Authority and its NC Quick Pass, allowing SunPass holders to use North Carolina's toll roads and lanes.

On November 12, 2014, an interoperability agreement was made with Georgia's Peach Pass, allowing SunPass holders to utilize the I-85 Express lanes and any future toll roads or lanes in the state.

The C-Pass system operated by Miami-Dade County Public Works on the Rickenbacker and Venetian Causeways was replaced by SunPass and pay-by-plate on September 23, 2014.

In July 2020, E-ZPass announced that SunPass would be compatible with E-ZPass by the end of 2020, and that Peach Pass would be compatible in 2021. On May 28, 2021, the Florida Turnpike Enterprise announced that its SunPass facilities would begin accepting E-ZPass. In addition, E-ZPass facilities began accepting SunPass Pro transponders (but not earlier SunPass transponders such as the SunPass Portable and SunPass Mini).

On February 27, 2023, it was announced that SunPass was compatible with toll roads in Kansas and Oklahoma, as well as on certain toll roads in Texas. Both the SunPass Mini and SunPass Pro transponders are supported. Certain transponders from these three states can be used on all roads operated by the Florida Turnpike Enterprise. However, Kansas, Oklahoma, and Texas transponders cannot be used on any tolled roads maintained by the Central Florida Expressway Authority.

In March 2025, the Harris County Toll Road Authority reached an interoperability agreement with the Florida Turnpike Enterprise. SunPass is accepted statewide in Texas, and EZ Tag & TxTag are accepted on all roads operated by the Florida Turnpike Enterprise.

In November 2025, the E-470 Public Highway Authority reached an interoperability agreement with the Florida Turnpike Enterprise. SunPass is accepted on E-470 & the express lanes network in Colorado, and ExpressToll is accepted on all roads operated by the Florida Turnpike Enterprise.

== See also ==
- List of toll roads in Florida
