= Lockhart, Florida =

Unincorporated area in Florida, US

- Census-designated place
- Location in Orange County and the state of Florida
- Coordinates: 28°37′21″N 81°26′04″W
- Country: United States
- State: Florida
- County: Orange

Area
  - Total: 4.61 sq mi (11.93 km^{2})
  - Land: 4.44 sq mi (11.49 km^{2})
  - Water: 0.17 sq mi (0.45 km^{2})
- Elevation: 82 ft (25 m)

Population (2020)
  - Total: 14,058
  - Density: 3,169.7/sq mi (1,223.81/km^{2})
- Time zone: UTC-5 (Eastern (EST))
  - Summer (DST): UTC-4 (EDT)
- ZIP code: 32810
- Area codes: 407, 689
- FIPS code: 12-41025
- GNIS feature ID: 2403241

Lockhart is a census-designated place in Orange County, Florida, United States. As of the 2020 census, Lockhart had a population of 14,058. It is part of the Orlando–Kissimmee–Sanford, Florida Metropolitan Statistical Area. The community is named for David Lockhart (19 March 1864 - 26 August 1923).

== Geography ==
According to the United States Census Bureau, the CDP has a total area of 11.8 km^{2} (4.6 mi^{2}), of which 11.3 km^{2} (4.4 mi^{2}) is land and 0.5 km^{2} (0.2 mi^{2}) (4.17%) is water.

== History ==
Lockhart was first established as a town when the Lockhart mill was completed in 1894. The town originally was known for its citrus and lumber production. By 1907, the town had 1907. In the 1920's, many new mill houses were constructed in an area known as New Hill.

On February 29, 2020, Orange County Commissioner Christine Moore worked with artist Lisa Mikler to paint a mural that depicts how Lockhart looked at its start. The mural is located at the intersection of Edgewater Drive and Lake Lockhart Drive.

== Demographics ==
Historical population
Census	Pop.	Note	%±
1970	5,809		—
1980	10,569		81.9%
1990	11,636		10.1%
2000	12,944		11.2%
2010	13,060		0.9%
2020	14,058		7.6%

=== 2020 census ===
As of the 2020 census, Lockhart had a population of 14,058. The median age was 37.8 years. 22.0% of residents were under the age of 18 and 14.0% of residents were 65 years of age or older. For every 100 females there were 97.6 males, and for every 100 females age 18 and over there were 95.3 males age 18 and over.

100.0% of residents lived in urban areas, while 0.0% lived in rural areas.

There were 5,244 households in Lockhart, of which 30.1% had children under the age of 18 living in them. Of all households, 38.6% were married-couple households, 21.6% were households with a male householder and no spouse or partner present, and 30.8% were households with a female householder and no spouse or partner present. About 23.8% of all households were made up of individuals and 7.6% had someone living alone who was 65 years of age or older.

There were 5,559 housing units, of which 5.7% were vacant. The homeowner vacancy rate was 1.8% and the rental vacancy rate was 6.7%.

Racial composition as of the 2020 census
Race	Number	Percent
White	6,011	42.8%
Black or African American	3,741	26.6%
American Indian and Alaska Native	76	0.5%
Asian	587	4.2%
Native Hawaiian and Other Pacific Islander	8	0.1%
Some other race	1,268	9.0%
Two or more races	2,367	16.8%
Hispanic or Latino (of any race)	3,900	27.7%

=== 2000 census ===
At the 2000 census, there were 12,944 people, 4,642 households and 3,305 families living in the CDP. The population density was 1,143.6/km^{2} (2,963.6/mi^{2}). There were 4,952 housing units at an average density of 437.5/km^{2} (1,133.8/mi^{2}). The racial makeup of the CDP was 73.79% White, 16.08% African American, 0.58% Native American, 2.21% Asian, 0.04% Pacific Islander, 4.21% from other races, and 3.09% from two or more races. Hispanic or Latino of any race were 16.09% of the population.

There were 4,642 households, of which 37.9% had children under the age of 18 living with them, 49.3% were married couples living together, 16.0% had a female householder with no husband present, and 28.8% were non-families. 20.1% of all households were made up of individuals, and 5.2% had someone living alone who was 65 years of age or older. The average household size was 2.79 and the average family size was 3.20.

Age distribution was 29.2% under the age of 18, 8.8% from 18 to 24, 34.1% from 25 to 44, 19.6% from 45 to 64, and 8.3% who were 65 years of age or older. The median age was 33 years. For every 100 females, there were 98.4 males. For every 100 females age 18 and over, there were 94.9 males.

The median household income was $38,169, and the median family income was $39,786. Males had a median income of $30,337 versus $24,006 for females. The per capita income for the CDP was $16,593. About 8.9% of families and 11.3% of the population were below the poverty line, including 15.9% of those under age 18 and 9.1% of those age 65 or over.

== Education ==
Public district schools are operated by Orange County Public Schools (OCPS).

=== High schools ===
- Wekiva High School

=== Middle schools ===
- Lockhart Middle School

=== Elementary schools ===
- Lake Weston Elementary School
- Lockhart Elementary School
- Riverside Elementary School
