= Four Corners, Florida =

Unincorporated area in Florida, US

- Census-designated place
- Location in Lake County and the state of Florida

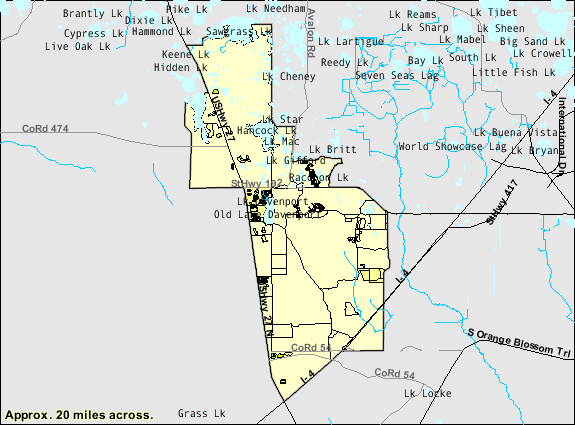
- U.S. Census Bureau map showing CDP boundaries
- Coordinates: 28°19′59″N 81°38′50″W
- Country: United States
- State: Florida
- Counties: Lake, Polk, Osceola, Orange

Area
  - Total: 50.96 sq mi (131.99 km^{2})
  - Land: 47.54 sq mi (123.12 km^{2})
  - Water: 3.42 sq mi (8.87 km^{2})
- Elevation: 115 ft (35 m)

Population (2020)
  - Total: 56,381
  - Density: 1,186.0/sq mi (457.93/km^{2})
- Time zone: UTC-5 (Eastern (EST))
  - Summer (DST): UTC-4 (EDT)
- ZIP codes: 33897, 34714, 34747, 34787
- FIPS code: 12-24581
- GNIS feature ID: 2402506

Four Corners is an unincorporated suburban area and census-designated place (CDP) in the U.S. state of Florida, located in the region around where Lake, Orange, Osceola, and Polk counties all meet together. Its population was 56,381 at the 2020 census, up from 26,116 at the 2010 census.

The Lake, Orange, and Osceola County portions of Four Corners are part of the Orlando–Kissimmee–Sanford, Florida Metropolitan Statistical Area, while the Polk County portion is part of the Lakeland–Winter Haven Metropolitan Statistical Area.

Splendid China was a theme park in Four Corners. It opened in 1993, closed on December 31, 2003, and sat abandoned for 10 years after that. Splendid China Florida cost $100 million to build. It was a 75-acre (30 ha) miniature park with more than 60 replicas at one-tenth scale. Margaritaville Resort opened on the former Splendid China site, with resort homes, condos and timeshares in a Jimmy Buffett-themed setting. In the summer of 2019, the Sunset Walk restaurants and shops opened next to the Margaritaville Resort. Radio Margaritaville broadcasts from the Margaritaville Resort.

ChampionsGate is a community located in Four Corners. The area is known for having several golf courses.

== Geography ==
Four Corners is in reference to the four-way intersection of the Lake, Orange, Osceola, and Polk County borders near the center of the CDP. Neighboring communities are Horizon West and Bay Lake to the northeast, Celebration to the east, and Loughman to the southeast. It is 25 miles (40 km) southwest of Orlando and 37 miles (60 km) northeast of Lakeland.

According to the United States Census Bureau, the Four Corners CDP has a total area of 50.8 square miles (131.7 km^{2}), of which 47.4 square miles (122.8 km^{2}) are land and 3.4 square miles (8.9 km^{2}), or 6.74%, are water.

The Census-drawn boundaries for the area include Interstate 4 along part of the southern border and U.S. Route 27 along part of the western border. The Western Beltway (Florida State Road 429) travels through the eastern portion of the CDP. Areas outside the CDP that are sometimes considered part of Four Corners include north along US 27 to Lake Louisa State Park (4 miles north of US 192), south along US 27 to Heart of Florida Hospital (3 miles south of I-4), west to SR 33, and east to Walt Disney World Resort and Celebration. Four Corners is the only community in Florida to be located in four counties.

The community has more lightning strikes per area than anywhere else in the United States.

== Demographics ==
Historical population
Census	Pop.	Note	%±
2000	12,015		—
2010	26,116		117.4%
2020	56,381		115.9%
U.S. Decennial Census

The community was first listed as a census designated place in the 2000 U.S. census under the name Citrus Ridge; the name was changed to Four Corners for the 2010 U.S. census.

=== Racial and ethnic composition ===
Four Corners CDP, Florida – Racial and ethnic composition Note: the US Census treats Hispanic/Latino as an ethnic category. This table excludes Latinos from the racial categories and assigns them to a separate category. Hispanics/Latinos may be of any race.
Race / Ethnicity (NH = Non-Hispanic)	Pop 2000	Pop 2010	Pop 2020	% 2000	% 2010	% 2020
White alone (NH)	9,213	15,167	27,465	76.68%	58.08%	48.71%
Black or African American alone (NH)	394	1,769	4,512	3.28%	6.77%	8.00%
Native American or Alaska Native alone (NH)	27	81	118	0.22%	0.31%	0.21%
Asian alone (NH)	274	621	1,369	2.28%	2.38%	2.43%
Native Hawaiian or Pacific Islander alone (NH)	8	29	32	0.07%	0.11%	0.06%
Other race alone (NH)	21	101	489	0.17%	0.39%	0.87%
Mixed race or Multiracial (NH)	204	489	2,621	1.70%	1.87%	4.65%
Hispanic or Latino (any race)	1,874	7,859	19,775	15.60%	30.09%	35.07%
Total	12,015	26,116	56,381	100.00%	100.00%	100.00%

=== 2020 census ===
As of the 2020 census, Four Corners had a population of 56,381. The median age was 36.2 years. 19.7% of residents were under the age of 18 and 13.8% of residents were 65 years of age or older. For every 100 females there were 91.2 males, and for every 100 females age 18 and over there were 88.9 males age 18 and over.

98.0% of residents lived in urban areas, while 2.0% lived in rural areas.

There were 21,336 households in Four Corners, of which 29.8% had children under the age of 18 living in them. Of all households, 47.0% were married-couple households, 17.3% were households with a male householder and no spouse or partner present, and 26.2% were households with a female householder and no spouse or partner present. About 21.7% of all households were made up of individuals and 6.4% had someone living alone who was 65 years of age or older.

There were 32,586 housing units, of which 34.5% were vacant. The homeowner vacancy rate was 5.8% and the rental vacancy rate was 17.0%.

Racial composition as of the 2020 census
Race	Number	Percent
White	31,438	55.8%
Black or African American	5,023	8.9%
American Indian and Alaska Native	251	0.4%
Asian	1,428	2.5%
Native Hawaiian and Other Pacific Islander	52	0.1%
Some other race	7,224	12.8%
Two or more races	10,965	19.4%

=== 2010 census ===
As of the 2010 United States census, there were 26,116 people, 9,673 households, and 6,836 families residing in the CDP.

Of the 9,673 households in 2010, 33.6% had children under the age of 18 living with them, 52.0% were headed by married couples living together, 13.3% had a female householder with no husband present, and 29.6% were non-families. 21.0% of all households were made up of individuals, and 4.9% were someone living alone who was 65 years of age or older. The average household size was 2.64, and the average family size was 3.05.

In 2010, 23.7% of the CDP population were under the age of 18, 8.6% were from 18 to 24, 30.1% were from 25 to 44, 25.0% were from 45 to 64, and 12.7% were age 65 or older. The median age was 36.7 years. For every 100 females, there were 94.6 males. For every 100 females age 18 and over, there were 91.8 males.

=== American Community Survey estimates ===
According to the 2016–2020 American Community Survey, there were an estimated 10,559 families in the CDP.

For the period 2013-2017, the estimated median annual income for a household in the CDP was $53,750, and the median income for a family was $57,173. Male full-time workers had a median income of $36,079 versus $30,070 for females. The per capita income for the CDP was $23,653. About 12.8% of families and 15.9% of the population were below the poverty line, including 27.4% of those under age 18 and 6.7% of those age 65 or over.

== Government and infrastructure ==
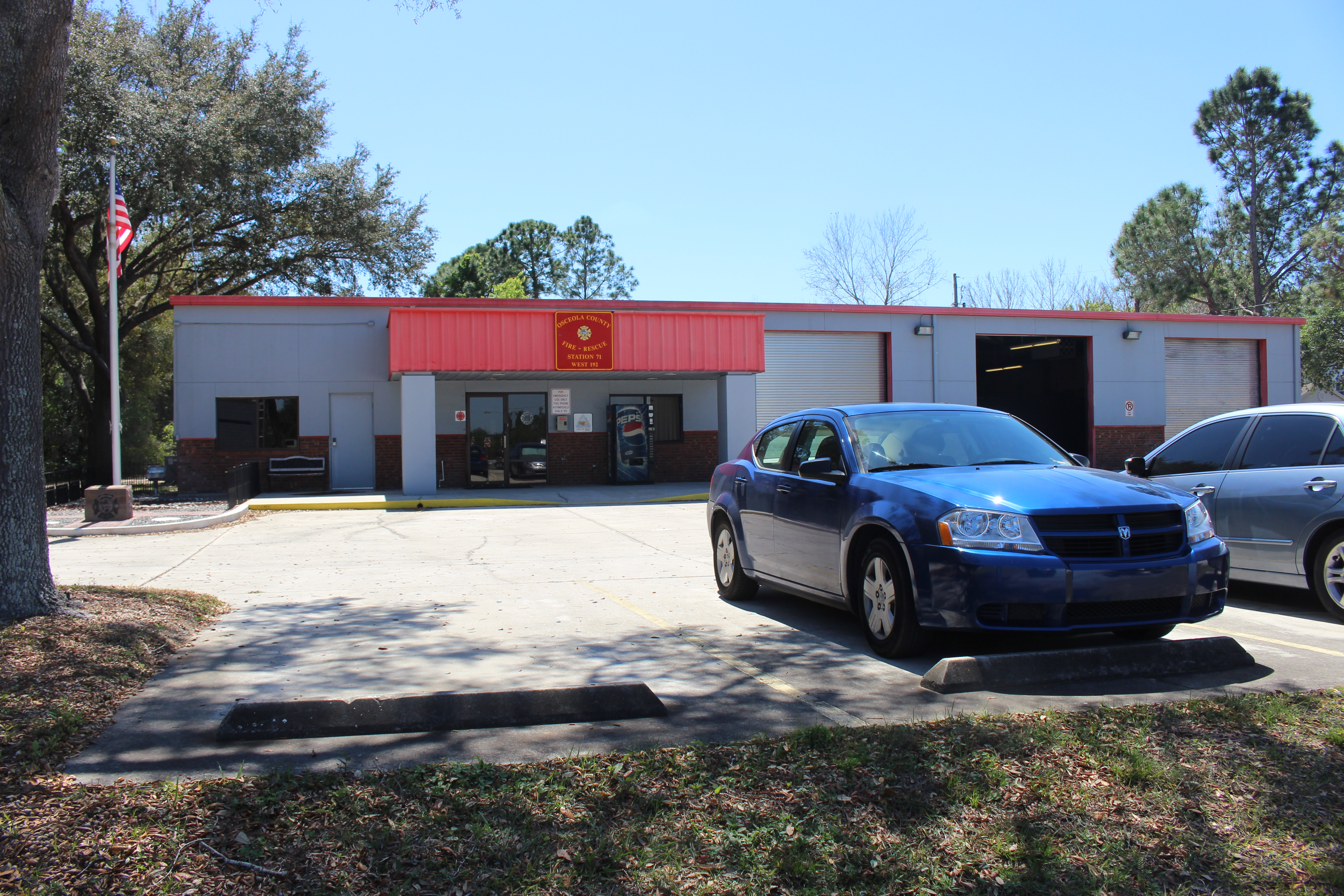
Osceola County Fire Rescue Station 71

Osceola County Fire Rescue operates Station 71 in Four Corners. Polk County Fire Rescue operates Station 42 (on U.S. 27 just south of U.S.192) and 33 (on Ronald Reagan Blvd just east of U.S. 27) in Four Corners. Lake County Fire Rescue operates Station 112 in Four Corners. Orange County Fire Rescue operates Station 32 in Four Corners.

== Education ==
The CDP is served by four different school districts:

- Lake County Schools
- Polk County Public Schools
- School District of Osceola County, Florida
- Orange County Public Schools
  - Residents of that section are zoned to: Keene's Crossing Elementary School, Bridgewater Middle School, and starting in 2017, Windermere High School. Residents were previously assigned to West Orange High School.

== Transportation ==
The Four Corners area is served by U.S. Routes 27 and 192, which intersect one mile west of the quadripoint.

The area is served by two Lynx bus routes, which terminate at Legacy Boulevard on US 192. Link 55 travels east on US 192, and link 427 travels south on US 27.
