= Horizon West, Florida =

Unincorporated area in Florida, US

- Census-designated place
- Interactive map of Horizon West, Florida
- Coordinates: 28°26′02″N 81°37′21″W
- Country: United States
- State: Florida
- County: Orange

Area
  - Total: 38.13 sq mi (98.75 km^{2})
  - Land: 32.73 sq mi (84.78 km^{2})
  - Water: 5.39 sq mi (13.97 km^{2})
- Elevation: 108 ft (33 m)

Population (2020)
  - Total: 58,101
  - Density: 1,774.9/sq mi (685.28/km^{2})
- Time zone: UTC-5 (Eastern (EST))
  - Summer (DST): UTC-4 (EDT)
- Area codes: 407, 689
- FIPS code: 12-32610
- GNIS ID: 2583355

Horizon West is a census-designated place (CDP) and unincorporated area in Orange County, Florida, United States. It is part of the Orlando–Kissimmee–Sanford, Florida Metropolitan Statistical Area. The population was 58,101 at the 2020 census.

Horizon West is a master-planned community consisting of a central town center, and five designated mixed-use villages: Bridgewater, Lakeside Village, Hickory Nut, Ovation Village, and Seidel Village, all set within a network of greenbelts. The concept was adopted in 1995 by Orange County. As of 2017, Horizon West can be considered one of the fast growing master-planned communities nationwide.

As an unincorporated area, Horizon West mailing addresses may instead use the city names and ZIP codes of Winter Garden, Windermere, Orlando, or another neighboring city, as there is no post office within the boundaries of Horizon West. Mail is instead routed to these neighboring cities' post offices.

== Geography ==
Horizon West is located in southwestern Orange County, directly north and west of Walt Disney World Resort.

Horizon West is bordered on the north by the city of Winter Garden, on the east by the town of Windermere, and on the south by the city of Bay Lake (the municipality which contains Walt Disney World Resort) and the census-designated place Four Corners.

It was a newly defined area as of the 2010 census. State Road 429, the Daniel Webster Western Beltway, runs through the CDP, connecting Ocoee to the north with Four Corners and Interstate 4 to the south.

According to the United States Census Bureau, the CDP has a total area of 38.1 square miles (98.6 km^{2}), of which 32.9 square miles (85.3 km^{2}) is land and 5.1 square miles (13.3 km^{2}), or 13.50%, is water.

In 2026, phase 1A of the Horizon West Regional Park opened, which included new parking, facilities, an even pavilion, and an inclusive playground. In October of that year, a new branch of the Orange County Public Library opened as well.

== Demographics ==
Historical population
Census	Pop.	Note	%±
2010	14,000		—
2020	58,101		315.0%
U.S. Decennial Census

Horizon West first appeared as a census designated place in the 2010 U.S. census.

=== Racial and ethnic composition ===
Horizon West racial composition (Hispanics excluded from racial categories) (NH = Non-Hispanic)
Race	Pop 2010	Pop 2020	% 2010	% 2020
White (NH)	8,856	31,257	63.26%	53.80%
Black or African American (NH)	839	2,822	5.99%	4.86%
Native American or Alaska Native (NH)	22	75	0.16%	0.13%
Asian (NH)	1,129	4,453	8.06%	7.66%
Pacific Islander or Native Hawaiian (NH)	10	25	0.07%	0.04%
Some other race (NH)	62	979	0.44%	1.68%
Two or more races/Multiracial (NH)	316	5,460	2.26%	9.40%
Hispanic or Latino (any race)	2,766	13,030	19.76%	22.43%
Total	14,000	58,101	100.00%	100.00%

=== 2010 census ===
As of the 2010 United States census, there were 14,000 people, 3,687 households, and 2,512 families residing in the CDP.

=== 2020 census ===
As of the 2020 census, Horizon West had a population of 58,101. The median age was 34.0 years. 28.2% of residents were under the age of 18 and 7.2% of residents were 65 years of age or older. For every 100 females there were 93.8 males, and for every 100 females age 18 and over there were 90.2 males age 18 and over.

94.6% of residents lived in urban areas, while 5.4% lived in rural areas.

There were 19,322 households in Horizon West, of which 46.9% had children under the age of 18 living in them. Of all households, 62.1% were married-couple households, 11.6% were households with a male householder and no spouse or partner present, and 19.7% were households with a female householder and no spouse or partner present. About 14.1% of all households were made up of individuals and 2.8% had someone living alone who was 65 years of age or older.

There were 20,965 housing units, of which 7.8% were vacant. The homeowner vacancy rate was 2.3% and the rental vacancy rate was 7.1%.

Racial composition as of the 2020 census
Race	Number	Percent
White	34,203	58.9%
Black or African American	3,005	5.2%
American Indian and Alaska Native	159	0.3%
Asian	4,520	7.8%
Native Hawaiian and Other Pacific Islander	30	0.1%
Some other race	4,105	7.1%
Two or more races	12,079	20.8%
Hispanic or Latino (of any race)	13,030	22.4%
