= Florida State Road 429 =

Highway in Florida

State Road 429
- SR 429 highlighted in red

Route information
- Maintained by FTE, CFX, and FDOT
- Length: 53.61 mi (86.28 km)
- Existed: July 2000–present

Major junctions
- South end: I-4 in Four Corners
- US 192 in Four Corners; Florida's Turnpike in Winter Garden; SR 414 / SR 451 in Apopka; SR 453 in Apopka
- North end: I-4 / SR 417 in Sanford

Location
- Country: United States
- State: Florida
- Counties: Osceola, Orange, Lake, Seminole

Highway system
- Florida State Highway System; Interstate; US; State; Former; Pre‑1945; Toll; Scenic
← SR 426	→ SR 430

State Road 429 (SR 429) is a controlled-access toll road in the Greater Orlando, Florida area. SR 429 serves as the western half of a beltway around the area, with SR 417 as the eastern half. South of US 441, the road is known as either the Daniel Webster Western Beltway or the Western Expressway; north of US 441, the road is known as Wekiva Parkway.

SR 429's mainline extends 51.77 miles (83.32 km) from I-4 in Four Corners north to I-4/SR 417 in Sanford, passing through Horizon West, Winter Garden, Ocoee, and Apopka. Various segments of the road are operated by the Florida Department of Transportation (FDOT), the Central Florida Expressway Authority (CFX), and Florida's Turnpike Enterprise (FTE).

== Route description ==
SR 429 traverses some of the highest elevations in Orange County and is often within a few miles of the Lake Wales Ridge. It runs along the west side of Greater Orlando, later curving around Apopka, crossing the Wekiva River into Seminole County and connecting with Interstate 4 and Florida State Road 417 to complete a nearly full ring around the city. The road peaks at Mile Marker 13 where on clear days it is possible to see the skyline of downtown Orlando to the northeast and various portions of Walt Disney World Resort to the southeast.

Florida's Turnpike Enterprise maintains the portion of the expressway south of Seidel Road, and CFX controls the portion north of the interchange. FDOT controls the portion north of SR 46.

== History ==
The highway is named the "Daniel Webster Western Beltway" in honor of Daniel Webster, Florida's longest-serving legislator and figure often involved in state transportation issues. Due to various complications in the planning and zoning phases of the roadway, Section B was constructed much later—nearly 15–20 years later—than Sections A and C.

=== Section A ===
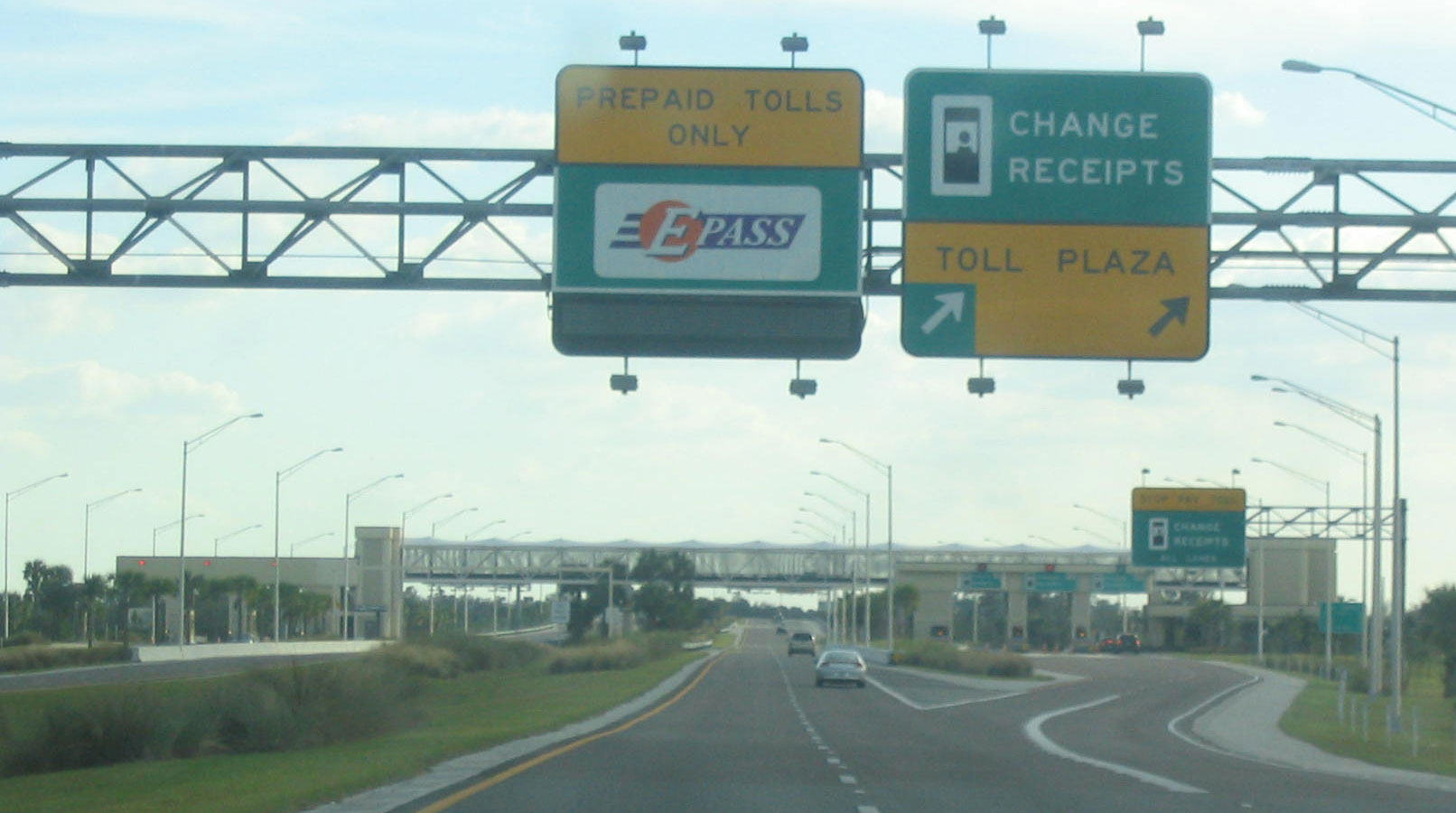
Southbound at the Forest Lake Mainline Toll Plaza

Section A is the original 10.6-mile (17.1 km) section from Florida's Turnpike in Ocoee, to US 441 in Apopka. It has a toll plaza in the middle, which was one of the first toll plazas in the Orlando area with open road tolling for users of the E-Pass and related electronic toll collection systems. The road itself was finished in July 2000, temporarily ending at SR 50, and the four-level cloverstack interchange with Florida's Turnpike was completed in February 2001. Prior to the reconstruction of the I-4/SR 408 interchange near Downtown Orlando in 2021, this interchange featured the highest ramp in the Orlando area.

SR 429 was planned to continue north from its original US 441 junction, but because the land needed for this proposed SR 429 extension's right of way was not secured ahead of time, new housing was developed north of the US 441 junction. This forced a change in plans for the extension of SR 429, leading to the re-designation of the northernmost 1.9 miles of what was SR 429 to the newly created State Road 451 (SR 451) toll road in January 2013. This “new” toll road — with minimal new construction (at its connection with the newly constructed SR 414/SR 429/SR 451 interchange) — consisted primarily of existing roadway, and in essence, simply re-designated the portion of SR 429 north of its junction with SR 414. In doing so — and in order to continue northward extension of SR 429, the original section of roadway south of SR 414 was rerouted on a track to the west, on a newly constructed section of highway that is dually-designated as both SR 429 and SR 414 toll roads, and extends them both to an interchange with US 441 (SR 500/Orange Blossom Trail) which lies approximately 2.5 miles north-west of the original SR 429/US 441 junction (now the SR 451/US 441 junction). North of this interchange with US-441, the SR 414 designation ends, and the toll road continues under the SR 429 designation. Thus, this rerouting shifted the roadway to the west, allowing it to continue north of US-441 on secured land before turning eastward and rejoining the right-of-way that was planned for construction of the long-awaited Wekiva Parkway. The Wekiva Parkway (section B) would complete the ultimate goal of extending SR 429 northwards to a junction with I-4, and thereby complete a Western Beltway around the Orlando metro area.

=== Section B ===
Section B, also known as the Wekiva Parkway, is a 25-mile (40 km) section of SR 429 connecting from US 441 in Apopka to I-4 in Sanford. It had been under debate for over a decade due to its planned alignment being complicated by the ecologically fragile Wekiva River basin, shifting support from Lake County, and the need to re-align the planned path due to the original route being blocked by residential development to the north of Section A's northern terminal junction with US-441. In 2004, an agreement was reached for its completion. SR 429 is now linked with SR 417, creating a continuous beltway north of Orlando; however, older plans involved a short drive on I-4 or its collector/distributor roads to reach SR 417.

On May 25, 2011, the Florida Department of Transportation and CFX announced that they were partnering to jointly explore the construction of the Wekiva Parkway extension. The proposed route would extend through Orange, Lake, and Seminole Counties and was estimated to cost $1.8 billion. Officials hoped to break ground in 2012, with completion by 2021.

On January 20, 2016, the first stub section from CR 435 (Mount Plymouth Road) near Haas Road in Orange County to SR 46 east of Camp Challenge Road in Lake County opened to traffic and it is the first all-electronic toll road in Central Florida.

On July 27, 2017, the Wekiva Parkway's mainline was extended from the US 441 connector road to a new northern terminus at Kelly Park Road.

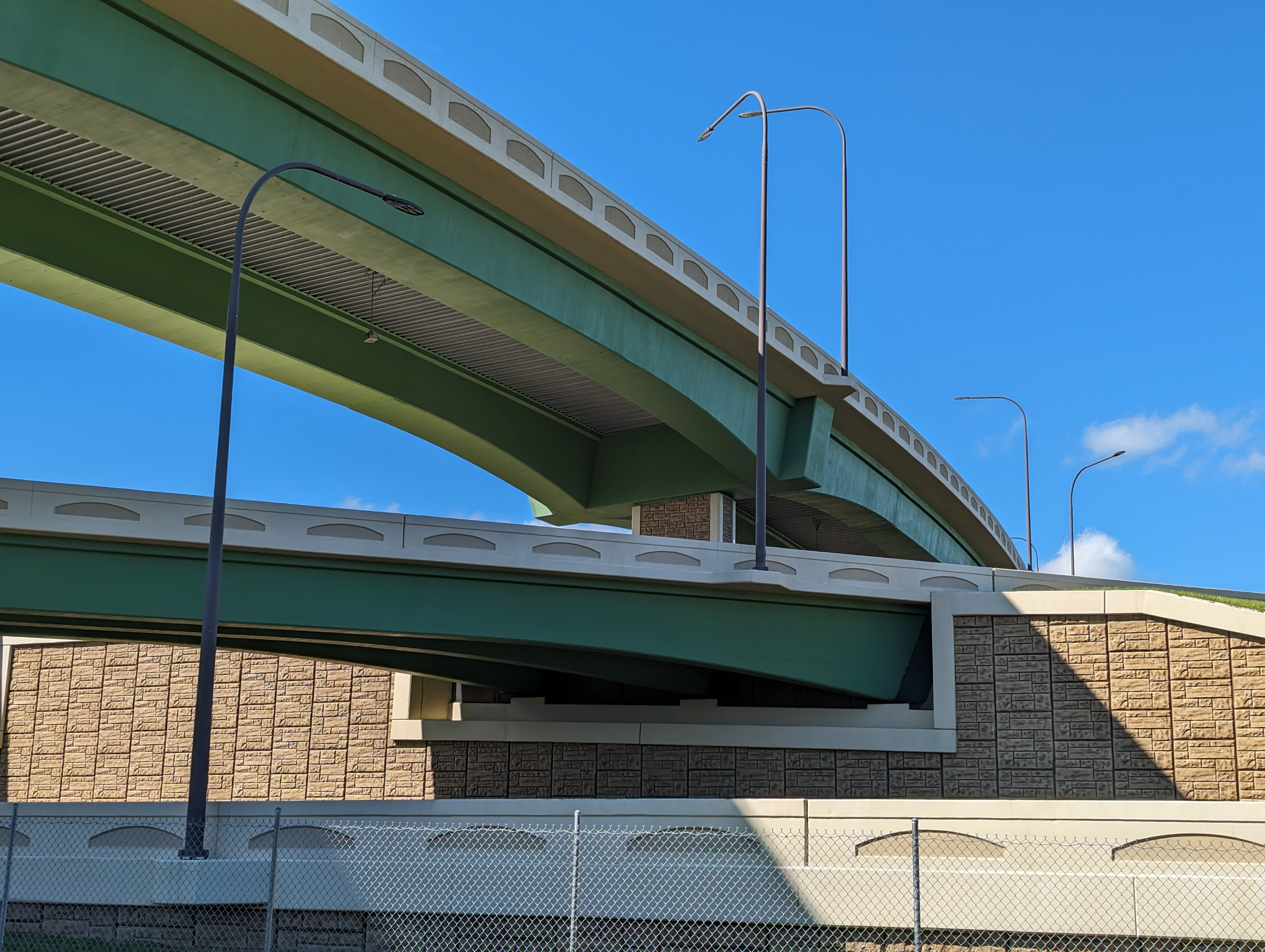
Florida State Road 453 & Florida State Road 429 flyover ramps from Ondich Road

On March 31, 2018, the Wekiva Parkway's mainline was extended from Kelly Park Road to a new northern terminus at SR 46. Along with this, a 3.36-mile (5.41 km) spur known as SR 453 connecting the Wekiva Parkway with SR 46 near Sorrento was opened in conjunction with the extension. This was the final section of the CFX's Section 2 of the road, and the final section of the CFX's section altogether. The final 12-mile (19 km) section of the Wekiva Parkway between SR 46 and I-4 was constructed and is maintained by FDOT.

On May 16, 2022, a 6-mile (9.7 km) section of the Wekiva Parkway between SR 46 near Mount Plymouth to SR 46 just west of Longwood Markham Road in Seminole County opened to traffic. This was the longest section of FDOT's section of the highway to open and includes several wildlife crossing bridges.

On August 1, 2022, the northbound lanes of a 2-mile (3.2 km) section of the Wekiva Parkway between SR 46 just west of Longwood Markham Road and SR 46 just west of Orange Boulevard in Seminole County opened to traffic, while the southbound lanes opened to traffic on August 15, 2022.

On October 21, 2022, the ramp from westbound I-4 to southbound SR 429, along with the section of the southbound lanes to SR 46 opened to traffic. This section is 1.75 miles (2.82 km) in length.

On January 26, 2024, the final segment of the Wekiva Parkway at SR 46 just west of Orange Boulevard in Seminole County to I-4 in Sanford opened to traffic, thus officially completing the entirety of SR 429 and by extension the greater beltway around Greater Orlando, comprising SR 429 along with SR 417.

=== Section C ===
Section C is the 22-mile (35 km) section from Florida's Turnpike to I-4 (SR 400) in Four Corners south of Walt Disney World. The 3-mile (4.8 km) section from Florida's Turnpike to CR 535 was completed in December 2002. The part from CR 535 south to New Independence Parkway opened December 16, 2005, with the extension to US 192 opening December 23. The Turnpike-maintained section, south of Seidel Road, was on a very tight construction schedule. An extended cold snap required the contractor to push to reach the opening date, although the interchanges at Western Way and Seidel Road were not complete. The Western Way interchange was not scheduled to open until Spring of 2006 to coincide with the opening of the new Expedition Everest ride at Disney's Animal Kingdom. The open road tolling gantry, while located north of US 192, was let for construction with the southern five miles (8 km) and was never intended to be open to traffic in conjunction with the 2005 opening between US 92 and Seidel. The Schofield Road interchange was identified as a future interchange, meaning that on December 23 no interchanges were open between US 192 and New Independence Parkway. Other openings were April 4, 2006 for Western Way, April 12, 2006, for Seidel Road, and December 9, 2006, for the remainder from US 192 south to I-4. The Schofield Road interchange opened in May 2015.

=== State Road 414 Phase 2 ===
During June 2010, construction work began on the westward extension of SR 414. Approximately 1 mile (1.6 km) of SR 429 roadway was demolished and on May 14, 2012, a new interchange opened from SR 429 northbound to SR 414 eastbound and from SR 414 westbound to SR 429 southbound. SR 429 and SR 414 now run concurrently to a new interchange with US 441 near Plymouth where the SR 414 designation ends. The control city is Mount Dora. The road previously signed as SR 429 north of the current SR 414 interchange has been redesignated as SR 451 and has been extended across US 441 to a new northern terminus at Vick Road.

== Exit list ==
County	Location	mi	km	Exit	Destinations	Notes
Osceola	Four Corners	0.000	0.000	1	I-4 – Orlando, Tampa	Semi-directional T interchange; I-4 east is exit 1; no exit number for I-4 west; exit 60 on I-4 (SR 400)
Osceola	Four Corners	0.745	1.199	1A	Sinclair Road	Diamond interchange; tolled northbound exit and southbound entrance
Osceola	Four Corners			5	Livingston Road	Under design as part of FTE SR 429 widening study
Osceola	Four Corners	4.512	7.261	6	US 192 – Kissimmee	Diamond interchange; tolled northbound exit and southbound entrance; unsigned SR 530
Orange	Four Corners	5.4	8.7	Western Beltway Mainline Toll Plaza		
Orange	Bay Lake	6.719	10.813	8	Western Way / Hartzog Road – Walt Disney World Resort	Partial cloverleaf interchange
Orange	Horizon West	9.837	15.831	11	Seidel Road	Half diamond interchange; tolled northbound exit and southbound entrance; transition from FTE to CFX maintenance
Orange	Horizon West			13A	SR 516 west (Lake-Orange Connector) to US 27 – Clermont	Future eastern end of SR 516, under construction
Orange	Horizon West	11.97	19.26	13B	Schofield Road	Partial cloverleaf interchange; tolled northbound exit and southbound entrance; opened May 2015
Orange	Horizon West	13.924	22.409	15	New Independence Parkway	Diamond interchange; tolled northbound exit and southbound entrance; to CR 545 (Avalon Road)
Orange	Horizon West	15.90	25.59	Independence Mainline Toll Plaza		
Orange	Winter Garden	18.5	29.8	18	Stoneybrook West Parkway	Half diamond interchange; tolled southbound exit and northbound entrance.
Orange	Winter Garden	18.288	29.432	19	CR 535 (Winter Garden Vineland Road)	Diamond interchange; tolled southbound exit and northbound entrance; to AdventHealth Winter Garden
Orange	Winter Garden	21.252	34.202	22	Florida's Turnpike to SR 408 – Miami, Ocala	Four-level cloverstack interchange; tolled road; exit 267A on Florida's Turnpike (SR 91)
Orange	Ocoee	21.586	34.739	23	SR 50 (West Colonial Drive)	Diamond interchange
Orange	Ocoee	23.026	37.057	24	SR 438 (Plant Street / Franklin Street)	Trumpet/partial cloverleaf interchange; tolled northbound exit and southbound entrance
Orange	Ocoee	25.541	41.104	26	West Road / Clarcona-Ocoee Road	Diamond interchange; tolled northbound exit and southbound entrance
Orange	Ocoee	26.66	42.91	Forest Lake Mainline Plaza		
Orange	Apopka	28.053	45.147	29	CR 437A (Ocoee-Apopka Road)	Diamond interchange; tolled southbound exit and northbound entrance; opened December 2011;; to AdventHealth Apopka
Orange	Apopka	29.162	46.932	30	CR 437A (Ocoee-Apopka Road)	Former northbound exit and southbound entrance; closed January 2012
Orange	Apopka	29.3	47.2	30	SR 414 east / SR 451 north – Maitland, Apopka	Semi-directional T interchange; southern terminus of SR 414 overlap; formerly exit 31; northbound exit and southbound entrance to SR 451
Orange	Apopka			31	CR 437 (Binion Road) / Boy Scout Road	Future interchange under design by CFX. Will be a partial interchange with northbound onramps and southbound offramps
Orange	Apopka	32.833	52.840	34	To US 441 (Orange Blossom Trail) / CR 437 (Plymouth-Sorrento Road)	Single-point urban interchange; western terminus of SR 414; former exit 33 now relocated to SR 451; Connector road carries hidden designation of SR 410
Orange	Apopka	32.833	52.840	Northern terminus of Western Beltway; southern terminus of Wekiva Parkway		
Orange	Apopka	35.5	57.1	Ponkan Mainline Toll Gantry (electronic toll collection)		
Orange	Apopka	37.20	59.87	38	Kelly Park Road	Partial cloverleaf interchange; northern terminus of SR 429 from July 27, 2017 to March 31, 2018
Orange	Apopka	38.29	61.62	39	SR 453 north – Mount Dora, Leesburg	Semi-directional T interchange; southern terminus of SR 453 (Wekiva Parkway); opened March 2018
Orange	Apopka			Mount Plymouth Mainline Toll Gantry (electronic toll collection)		
Orange	Apopka	40.63	65.39	–	CR 435 (Mount Plymouth Road)	Former temporary interchange to connect with CR 435; closed March 2018; transition from CFX to FTE maintenance
Lake		41.75	67.19	Sorrento Toll Gantry (electronic toll collection)		
Lake		43.19	69.51	44	SR 46 / CR 46A – Sorrento, Mount Plymouth	Diamond interchange
Lake		46	74	Wekiva River Toll Gantry (electronic toll collection)		
Seminole		49.82	80.18	50	SR 46	Dumbbell interchange
Seminole		51.77	83.32	52	SR 46 east – Sanford Historic District	Northbound exit and southbound entrance
Seminole		52.56	84.59	Orange Toll Gantry (electronic toll collection)		
Seminole		53.16	85.55	55B	International Parkway – Heathrow	Diamond interchange; picks up numbering from SR 417
Seminole		53.39	85.92	55A	I-4 – Daytona Beach, Orlando	Cloverstack interchange; picks up numbering from SR 417; westbound I-4 to southbound SR 429 opened on October 21, 2022, rest of the interchange opened on January 26, 2024; exit 101C on I-4 (SR 400)
Seminole		53.39	85.92		SR 417 south – Sanford	Continuation beyond I-4; northern terminus of SR 417 (Seminole Expressway)
1.000 mi = 1.609 km; 1.000 km = 0.621 mi: Closed/former; Concurrency terminus; Electronic toll collection; Route transition; Unopened

== See also ==
- Central Florida Expressway Authority
- Florida State Road 453
