= Effects of Hurricane Ian in Florida =

Hurricane Ian
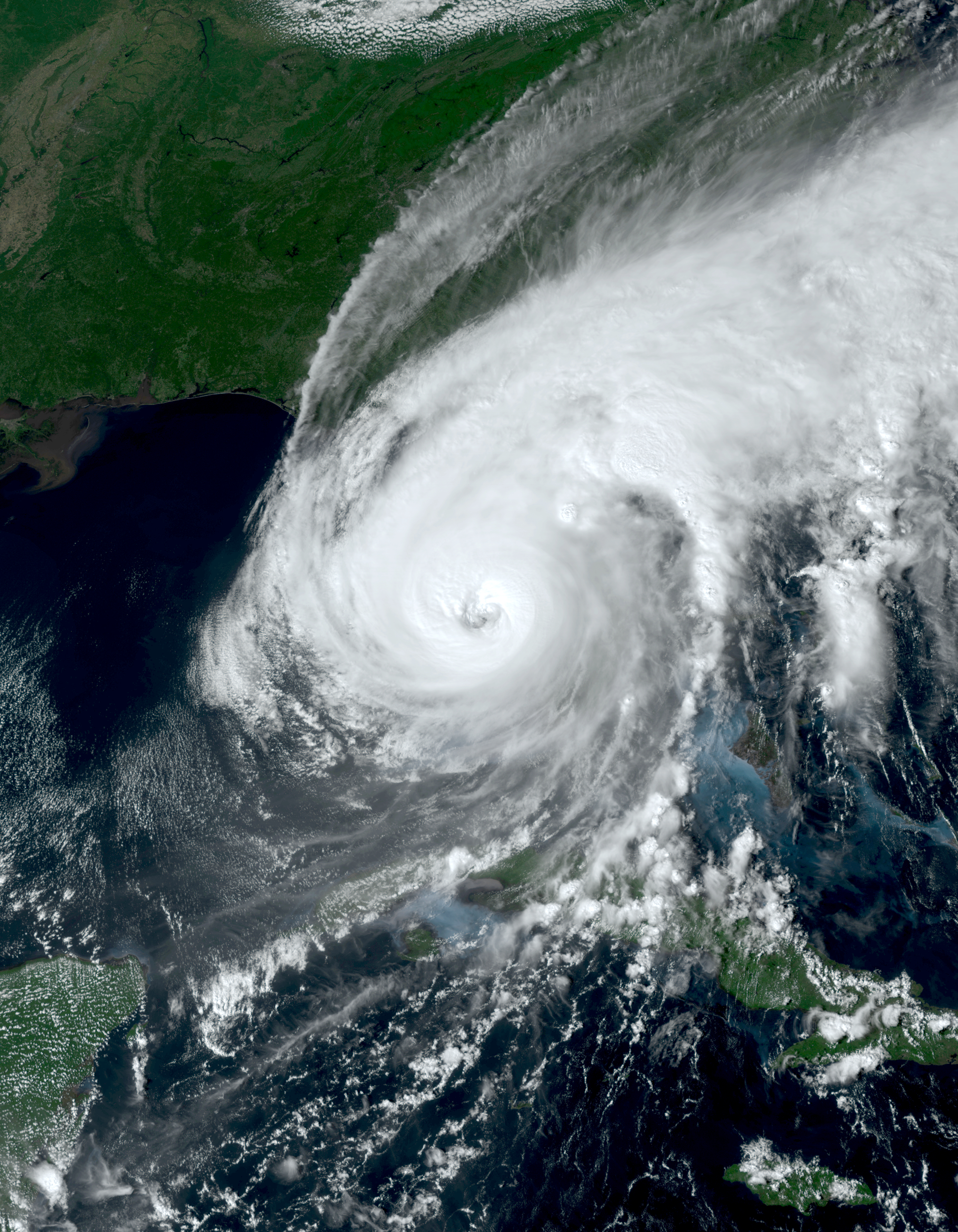
- Hurricane Ian making landfall in Florida on September 28

Meteorological history
- Duration: September 27–30, 2022

Category 4 major hurricane
- 1-minute sustained (SSHWS/NWS)
- Highest winds: 150 mph (240 km/h)
- Lowest pressure: 941 mbar (hPa); 27.79 inHg

Overall effects
- Fatalities: 150
- Damage: $110 billion (2024 USD)
- Areas affected: South Florida, Central Florida
- Part of the 2022 Atlantic hurricane season

Hurricane Ian caused severe damage in Florida in September 2022, becoming the costliest hurricane in the state's history. Ian also became the deadliest hurricane in Florida since the 1935 Labor Day hurricane.

== Preparations ==
Prior to Ian's landfall, Florida was predicted to receive large amounts of flooding.

On September 24, Governor Ron DeSantis declared a state of emergency for all of Florida. Tampa Bay area schools also announced closures, and several colleges and universities, including the University of South Florida, the University of Tampa, and Eckerd College announced that they were canceling classes and closing. By September 27, 55 public school districts across the state announced cancellations, many through the end of the week. Officials at the Kennedy Space Center delayed the launch of NASA's Artemis 1, and the rocket was returned to the Vehicle Assembly Building. President Joe Biden approved a state of emergency declaration for Florida on September 24, authorizing FEMA to pre-stage 110,000 gallons of fuel and 18,000 pounds of propane, and sending 1300 workers to Florida. Many airports and ports in Tampa, Tampa Bay, Orlando, St. Petersburg, Key West, and other places announced that they would be suspending operations. Walt Disney World, Universal Orlando, and Busch Gardens Tampa Bay said that they would be closing attractions. A number of stores and restaurants like Walmart and Waffle House were closed because of the impending dangerous weather.

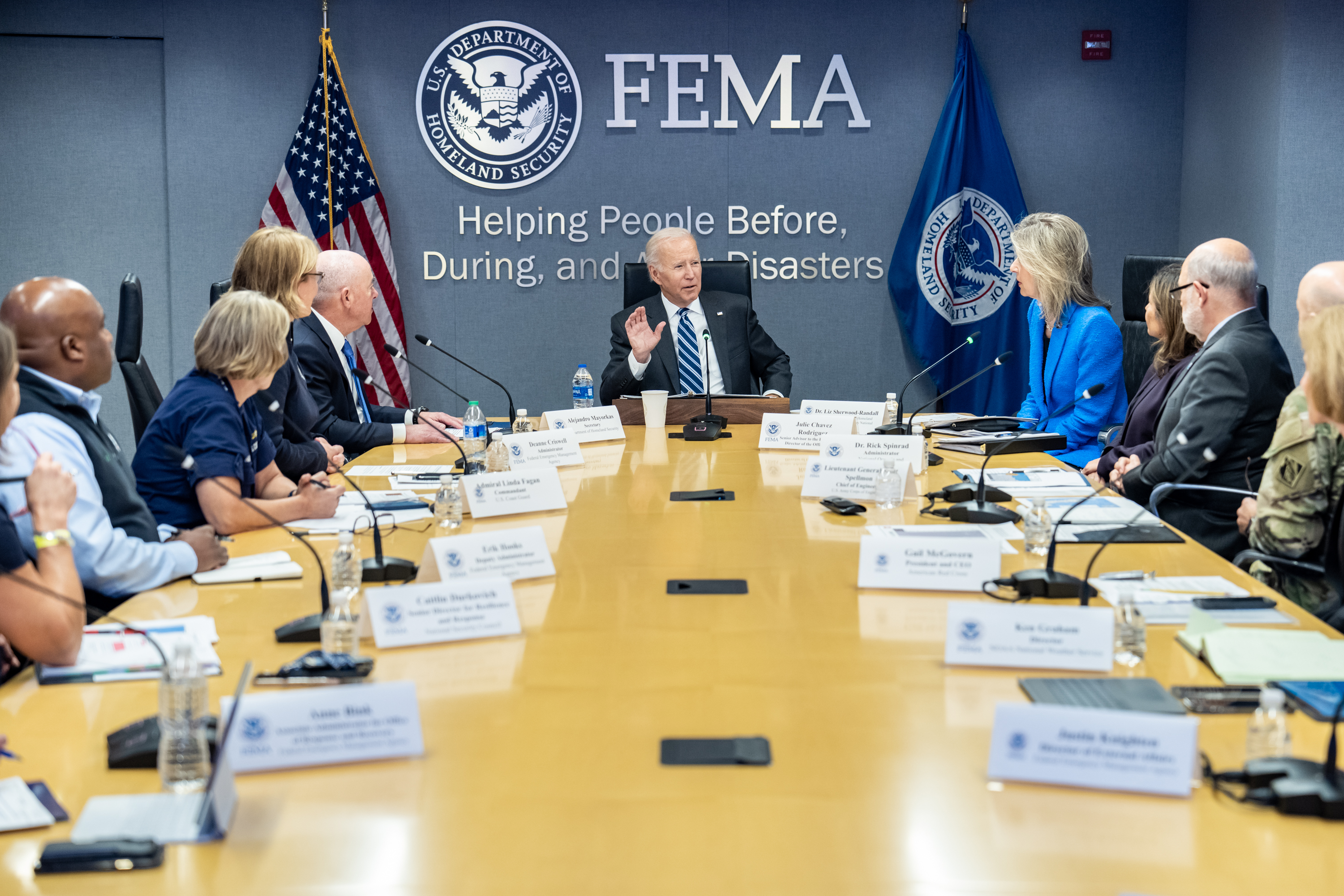
President Biden meeting with FEMA officials in advance of the hurricane on September 29

Mandatory evacuation orders were issued for parts of multiple counties. Around 300,000 people were evacuated in Hillsborough County (which centers on Tampa) with schools and other locations being used as shelters. Before the impact school closures and mandatory evacuations were made across much of the Florida peninsula. DeSantis mobilized 5,000 Florida state national guard troops.

Another 2,000 were deployed on standby in neighboring states. Officials in Tallahassee and nearby cities commissioned the monitoring of local power lines and scouring of storm-water systems to make sure them prepared and secure. During the evacuations, intense traffic began developing on Interstate 4.

The college football game between the East Carolina Pirates and the South Florida Bulls was moved from South Florida's stadium in Tampa to Boca Raton. The Tampa Bay Buccaneers of the National Football League moved practices from Tampa south to the Miami Dolphins training facility in Miami Gardens.

Amtrak suspended its Auto Train service for September 27–28 and truncated the September 26 southbound Silver Star service, which was already on a modified schedule due to the suspension of the Silver Meteor service, at Jacksonville, Florida, on September 27. Silver Star service was canceled for September 27–28 with the northbound Silver Star for September 29 also canceled. Ian's updated track forecast then prompted them to suspend those services through October 1. Palmetto service was also truncated for Washington D.C., on September 30 and October 1. As Ian dissipated over the Carolinas, Amtrak modified its schedule, truncating the October 2 southbound Silver Star at Jacksonville, which would be the origin of the October 3 northbound Silver Star. Bus transportation was provided for Orlando and Tampa. Additionally, the resumption of the Silver Meteor service, which had been suspended since January 24, 2022, due to a resurgence of the Omicron variant of COVID-19, was pushed back from October 3 to 11. The modified schedule and the resumption of service for the Silver Meteor was then pushed out to October 13 due to the extensive damage inflicted along the Central Florida Rail Corridor. Full resumptions of both of these services would occur over a period from October 14–17.

All three national parks in Florida closed in preparation for the hurricane. The Florida section of Gulf Islands National Seashore was also closed, as was the entirety of Canaveral National Seashore.

== Impact ==
On September 29, Lee County Sheriff Carmine Marceno, whose jurisdiction covers Cape Coral and Fort Myers, estimated that thousands of people may have still been trapped in floodwaters. President Biden said the storm could end up as the deadliest in Florida's history. In an interview on September 29, Marceno said that hundreds of deaths may have occurred, but he and Governor DeSantis later downplayed the remark.

According to the Florida Medical Examiners Commission, as of February 3, 2023, 149 people were confirmed to have died across Florida as a direct result of Hurricane Ian. 72 of those deaths occurred in Lee County, and 9 occurred in neighboring Charlotte County. (Note: The Charlotte County Sheriff's Office has claimed that 24 deaths have occurred. However, the Florida Medical Examiners Commission has only been able to verify 9 deaths from Ian.) In the Florida Keys, seven Cuban migrants drowned when their boat capsized off Stock Island, in Monroe County, as Ian moved through; 11 others were missing. In addition, ten people died in Sarasota and Collier Counties; seven in Monroe and Volusia Counties; five in Hillsborough, Manatee, and Osceola Counties; four in Hardee County; three in Orange and Putnam Counties; two each in Hendry and Polk Counties; and one each in DeSoto, Lake, and Martin, Miami-Dade and St. Lucie Counties. Ian also caused two indirect deaths in Sarasota County, a 94-year-old man, and an 80-year-old woman, both due to disabled oxygen machines that they were using. Another from Lee County reportedly died by suicide after seeing the extent of damage done to his property after the storm.

Overall, more than 2.4 million people in Florida lost power during the storm and in its aftermath. Rainfall in Ponce Inlet, the highest in the state, was recorded at 31.52 inches (801 mm). Total damage in Florida was estimated at $109.5 billion.

=== South Florida and the Florida Keys ===
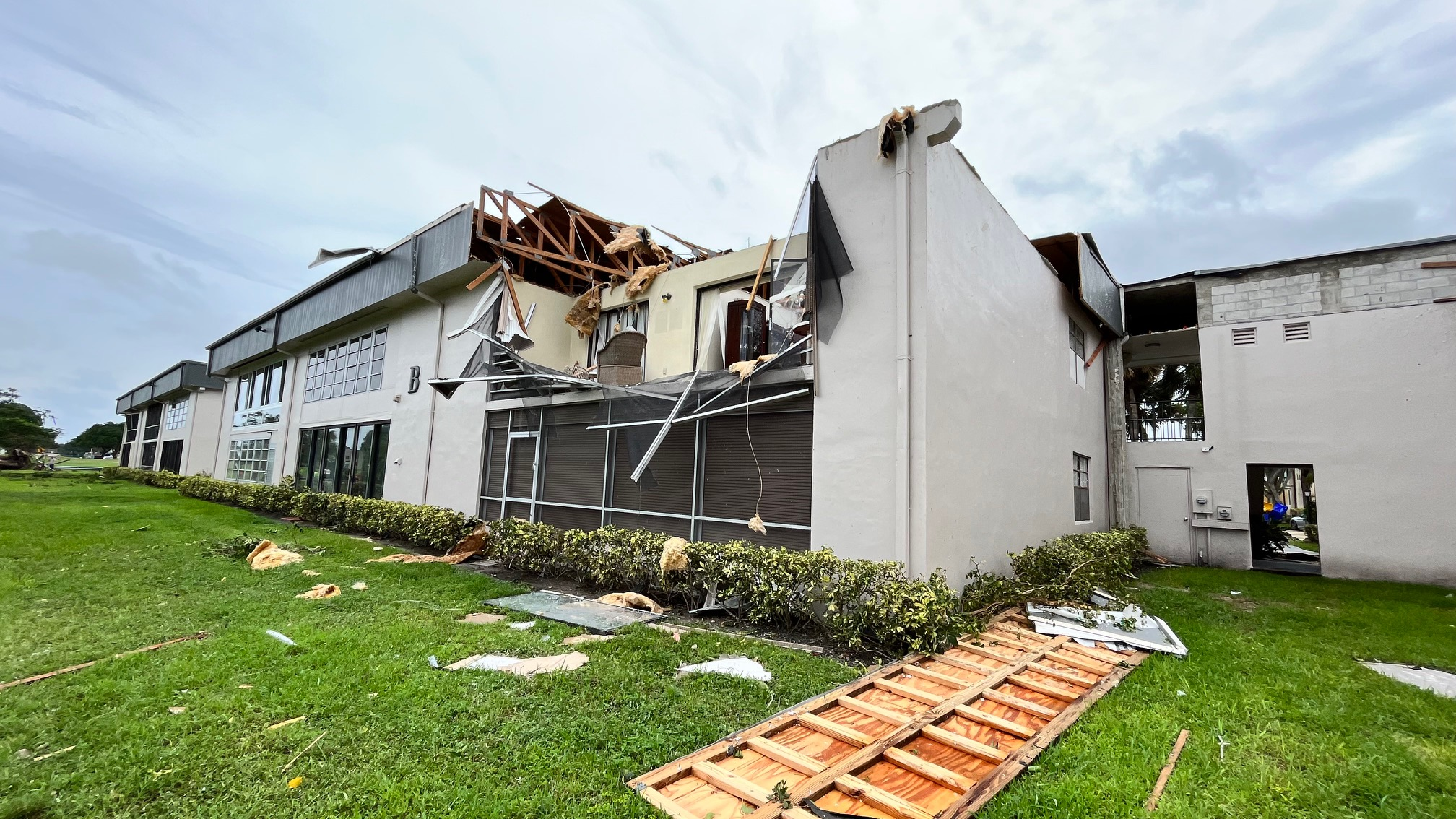
Damage in Kings Point, Florida from an EF2 tornado which was spawned by Hurricane Ian

Tropical-storm-force sustained wind speeds with hurricane-force wind gusts were observed at Key West International Airport before 22:00 UTC (18:00 EDT) the same day; the city of Key West subsequently recorded its third-highest storm surge since 1913. Coastal flooding impacted 93 homes, with 38 experiencing substantial damage and 55 others suffering minor damage, while several cars on the south side of the Truman Annex were flooded. Residents of approximately 24 family units in that neighborhood fled their dwellings due to rising floodwaters. Additionally, a fire ignited during the storm demolished 14 business and 14 residential units. The southwest side of Stock Island reported several impassable streets and widespread flood damage to sheds and outbuildings. Similar impacts occurred on islands north of there through Big Pine Key. Almost 10,000 customers beyond the west end of the Seven Mile Bridge lost power, roughly one-third of electrical subscribers in the Lower Florida Keys. Storm surge flooding farther north briefly left some streets impassible, while winds caused isolated and sporadic power outages. Throughout the Florida Keys, the hurricane ripped about 150 vessels loose from their moorings.

Several tornadoes touched down in South Florida as the storm approached on September 27–28; 12 tornadoes touched down with all but one of them occurring in the Miami metropolitan area. One EF1 tornado severely damaged over 20 aircraft and several hangars at the North Perry Airport in Broward County; additional structures and trees were also damaged. An EF2 tornado on the night of September 27 overturned multiple cars, shattered windows, damaged several roofs, and toppled a large tree onto an apartment building at Kings Point in Palm Beach County, injuring two people. Another EF1 tornado damaged several roofs and caused some significant tree damage in Wellington and Loxahatchee. The same storm quickly produced another EF1 tornado as the first one dissipated; damage was inflicted to trees and the roofs of a stable and a house. The other tornadoes were rated EFU-EF0. Wind gusts reportedly did not exceed 60 mph (97 km/h) in the Gold Coast, but some minor wind damage was reported and power outages in the tri-county area affected 15,632 customers.

=== Southwest Florida ===
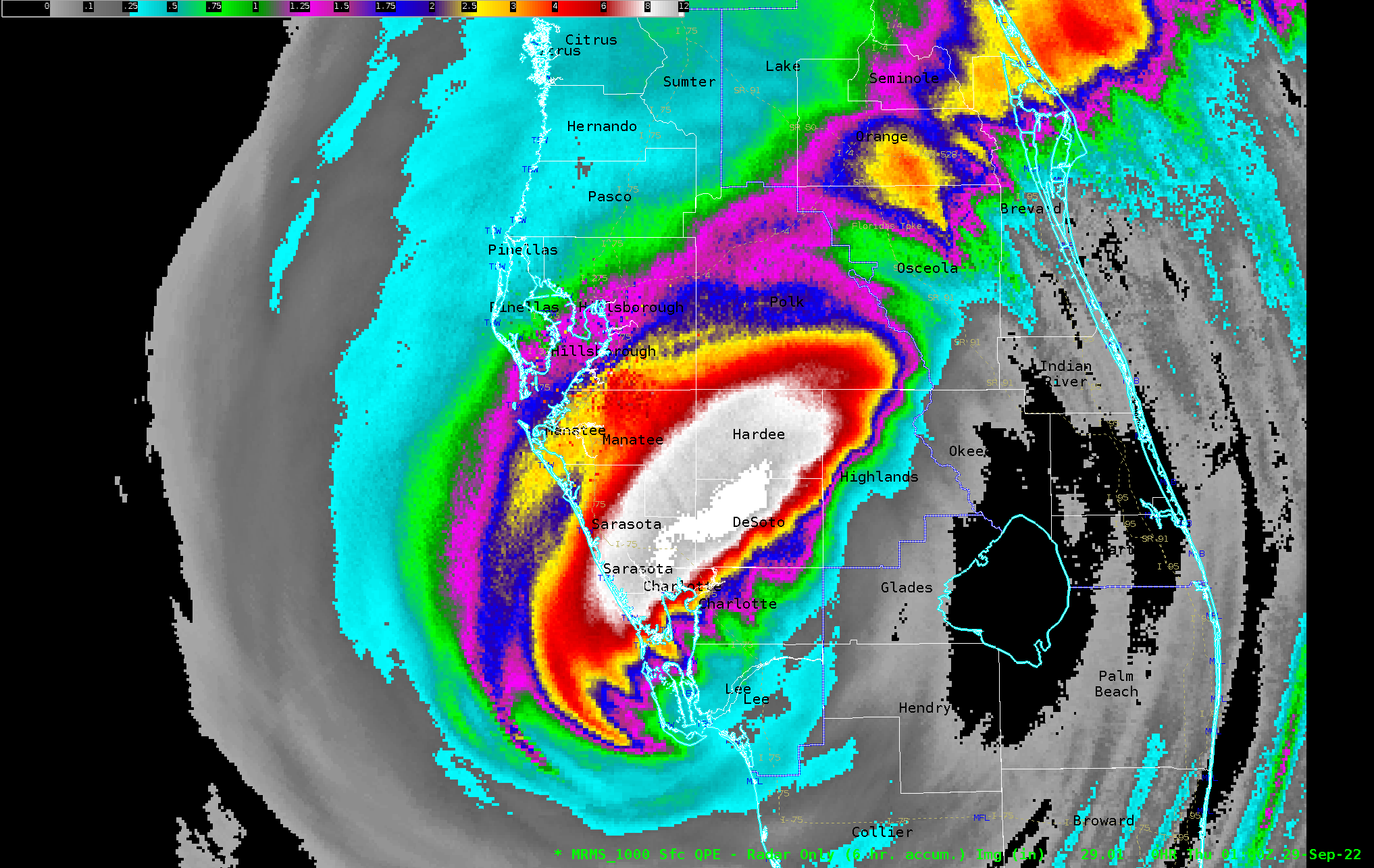
6-hour rainfall totals for Hurricane Ian; showing areas with a widespread amount (8–12 inches) of rain on September 28

With the storm making landfall in Southwest Florida on September 28 as a strong Category 4 hurricane with sustained winds of 150 mph (241 km/h), the National Weather Service in Tampa issued multiple extreme wind warnings, indicating the likelihood for damage caused by sustained winds of 115 mph (185 km/h) or greater. Heavy precipitation across the region prompted the National Weather Service to issue a flash flood emergency for portions of Charlotte, DeSoto, Hardee, Highlands, Manatee, and Sarasota Counties due to accumulated rainfall of 20+ inches (508+ mm). The National Hurricane Center's advisory at 15:00 UTC warned that the "extremely dangerous eyewall of Ian" is "moving onshore." Sustained hurricane-force winds were confirmed in several places at the landfall point in Southwest Florida, including one report southeast of Cape Coral, where the location recorded a wind gust of 140 mph (225 km/h), around the time of Ian's second landfall. A private weather station near Port Charlotte reported a sustained wind of 115 mph (185 km/h), with a wind gust of 132 mph (212 km/h).

The hardest-hit areas were in Lee County, where catastrophic damage occurred as Ian pushed a destructive 10–15 ft (3.0–4.6 m) storm surge into Fort Myers Beach, Sanibel Island, and Bonita Springs, just south of where its eye made landfall. Meteorologists Jeff Masters and Bob Henson stated the "sea level along the southwest Florida coast is about a foot higher than it was 100 years ago, because of sea-level rise from human-caused climate change" and that the rise in sea-level could "substantially increase the storm surge damage from Ian". Combined with high winds this resulted in damage to 52,514 buildings and homes, which included minor damage to 16,314 structures, major damage to 14,245 structures, and the destruction of 5,369 others. A preliminary estimate placed building damages at $6.8 billion.

Additionally, a large portion of the Sanibel Causeway collapsed and washed away during the storm, cutting off all vehicle access to Sanibel. Vehicular access to the island was re-established on October 11 for emergency workers and public access was re-established October 21 for local residents. This cut off the J. N. "Ding" Darling National Wildlife Refuge, forcing them to temporarily close. The hurricane damaged the Pine Island Causeway and washed out the approach to it which connected Pine Island to the mainland. A temporary bridge was opened for public use on October 5. Both the Sanibel Causeway and the Matlacha Bridge are eligible for federal bridge rehabilitation funds.

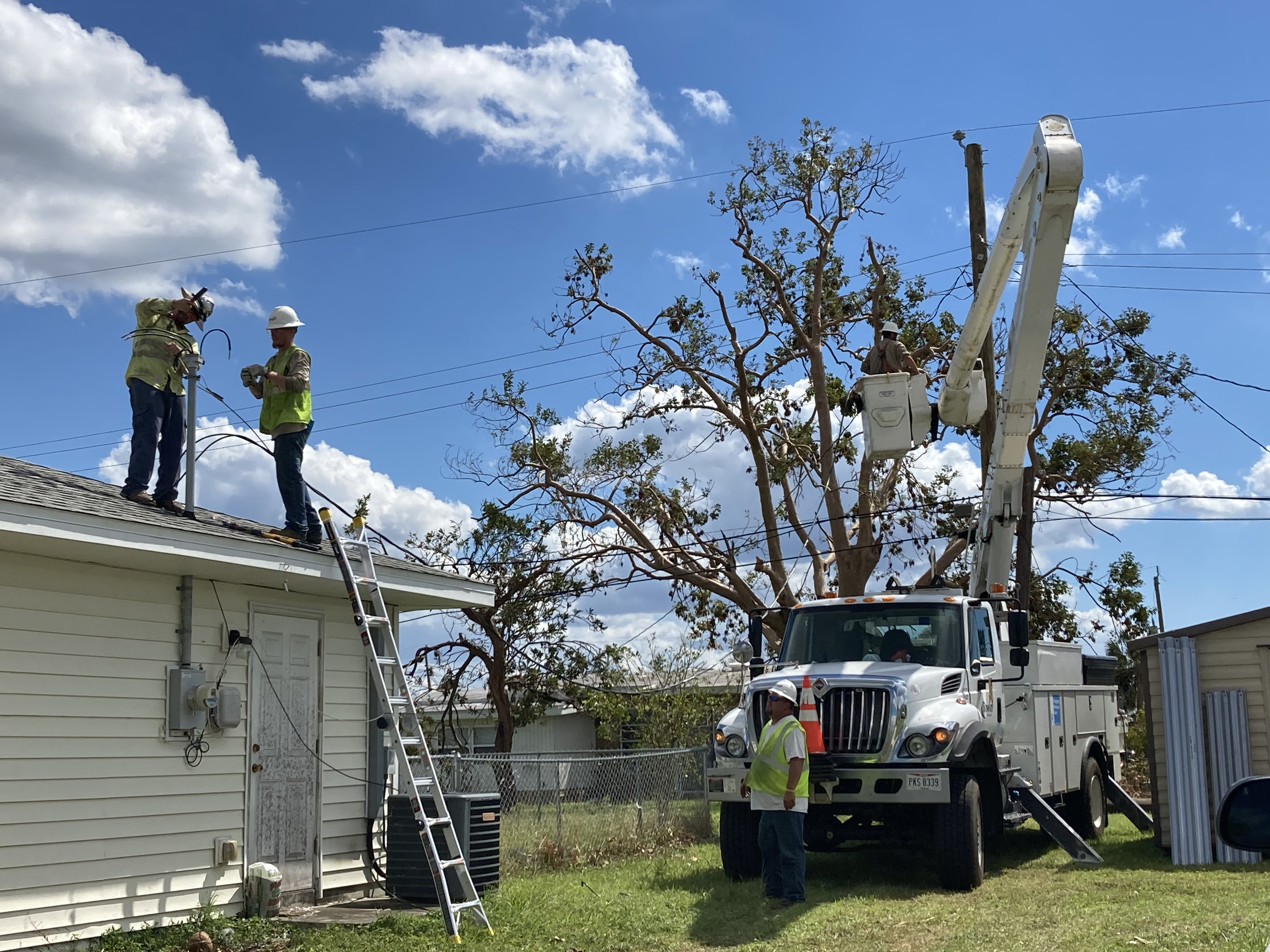
Electrical workers restoring power to homes in Port Charlotte. Utilities prepare for extensive damage to infrastructure when a storm of Ian's magnitude is to make landfall.

In Collier County, rising coastal floodwaters in the Naples area trapped people and prompted numerous calls for rescue. Water entered the first floor of several parking garages, impacting many cars. A fire station was completely flooded, substantially damaging nearly all of the equipment in the building. Damages in Naples alone was estimated at $989 million. The ambulance bay and helipad were inundated at a hospital in North Naples. Multiple rescues occurred in Goodland after some people unsuccessfully attempted to flee the storm surge. Farther inland 4 to 6 ft (1.2 to 1.8 m) of water covered portions of US 41 near Carnestown. Aside from Naples Ian caused $256 million in damages in Marco Island, $7.1 million in Everglades City, and $948 million in unincorporated areas. Throughout the county, the hurricane caused major impacts to 3,515 commercial and residential structures and demolished 33 others. Building damages alone in Collier County totaled about $2.2 billion.

After moving across Charlotte Harbor, the eye of Hurricane Ian made landfall on the Florida Peninsula in Charlotte County, near Punta Gorda. While escaping the storm surge that occurred further to the south, catastrophic wind damage occurred in Charlotte County. In all, more than 200 homes were destroyed in Charlotte County. Ian also dumped over 2 feet of rain in portions of the county, with the storm maximum rainfall total of 26 inches (660 mm) being recorded in Grove City.

Further inland, Winds affected 112 structures in Hendry County, with damages estimated at $419,000. Parts of Glades County likely experienced hurricane-force wind gusts, destroying 3 structures, causing major damage to 14 structures and inflicting minor damage on 25 others. An EF0 tornado in Moore Haven damaged trees and homes and tipped over two storage trailers. Several counties inland experienced heavy rains during Ian. In Hardee County, the Peace River crested at a record height of 27.2 ft (8.3 m) near Zolfo Springs, while wind gusts reached 81 mph (130 km/h) in Wauchula. The county also reported minor damage to 367 buildings and homes, major damage to 114 buildings and homes, and the destruction of 18 others. Wind gusts in Highlands County peaked at 78 mph (126 km/h) at the Sebring Regional Airport, leaving 56,690 customers without power; approximately 89% of the county had no electricity. Ian spawned a brief tornado in Lake Placid and possibly another in Sebring.

=== Tampa Bay ===
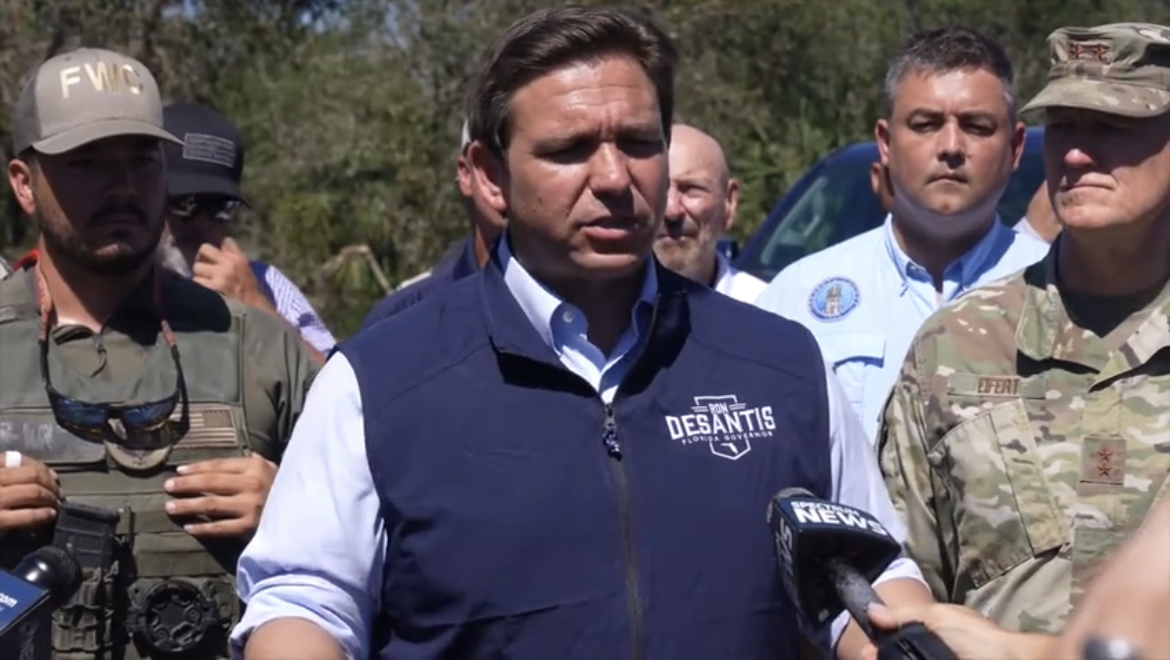
Florida Governor Ron DeSantis holds a press conference while touring the damage in North Port, Sarasota County on October 2, 2022

Although the storm was a considerable threat to the majority of the Tampa Bay area, Ian's core remained well to the south of Tampa and St. Petersburg. Ian's blowout tide pulled a large amount of water out of Tampa Bay, with tides reaching 5 to 7 ft (1.5 to 2.1 m) below normal at the Hillsborough County side of the bay. Parts of the county also received 5 to 8 in (130 to 200 mm) of precipitation and wind gusts generally ranging from 65 to 75 mph (105 to 121 km/h). Damages in Hillsborough County totaled $54.8 million. Tides also decreased in Pinellas County, falling to 4 ft (1.2 m) below average along the coast and 5 ft (1.5 m) in Tampa Bay. A total of 191,415 customers lost electricity, over one-third of the county. Overall, 31 dwellings reported major damage and 86 others suffered minor damage. Ian caused $22.6 million in damages throughout Pinellas County. Ian produced wind gusts up to 75 mph (121 km/h) and rainfall ranging from 4 to 12 in (100 to 300 mm) in Polk County. Around 35% of customers lost electricity, while wind damage varied from isolated in Lakeland to much more commonplace in Fort Meade and Frostproof. Overall, Ian caused minor damage to 799 structures and major damage to 192 others in the county. Areas north of Tampa reported minor or sporadic wind damage, including some tree damage and a loss of shingles in Pasco, Citrus, and Levy counties. The Tampa Bay Lightning hockey team was forced to postpone two preseason games due to the storm.

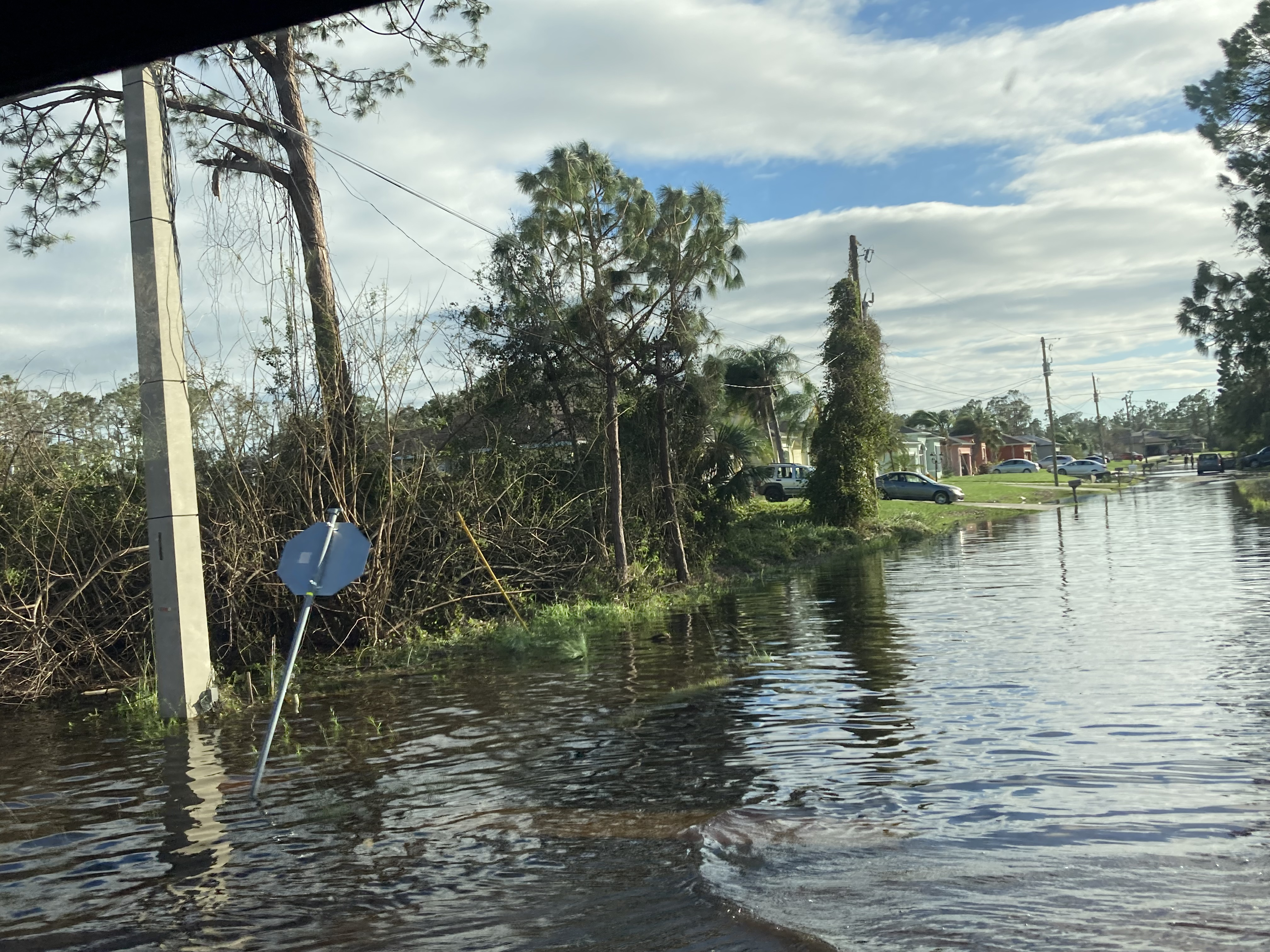
Flooding and Damage from Hurricane Ian in North Port, Sarasota County

The most impacted areas of the western coast were in Sarasota and Manatee counties. Sarasota County reported extensive tree and structural damage due to wind, as well as significant flooding in inland areas, specifically in and around Venice and North Port. Most of the southern portion of the county remained in Ian's northern eyewall for nearly five hours, subjected to extreme wind and over 20 inches (510 mm) of rain, which caused catastrophic flooding. In North Port, vast portions of the city were impassible due to floodwaters, while the Myakka River reached a record flood stage on September 30 of 12.55 ft (3.83 m), forcing a 12-mile (19 km) portion of I-75 to close on Friday as the Myakka River flooded portions of the highway. As winds in the area approached the 50–60 mph (80–97 km/h) range, the Sunshine Skyway Bridge was also forced to close. On October 2, Florida Governor Ron DeSantis visited North Port, and described the flooding as the worst he had seen across Florida. Venice turned off the water supply to the island of Venice, which has since been restored. Ian brought similar conditions to Manatee County. The cyclone destroyed 10 structures there, 297 structures were majorly impacted, and 891 others had minor impacts. Overall, the storm left over 1.05 million cubic yards (803,000 cubic meters) of debris in Sarasota County, and over 233,000 cubic yards (155,000 cubic meters) of debris in Manatee County. As of October 10, 2022, the damage estimates in Sarasota and Manatee County totaled over $230 million.

=== Central Florida ===
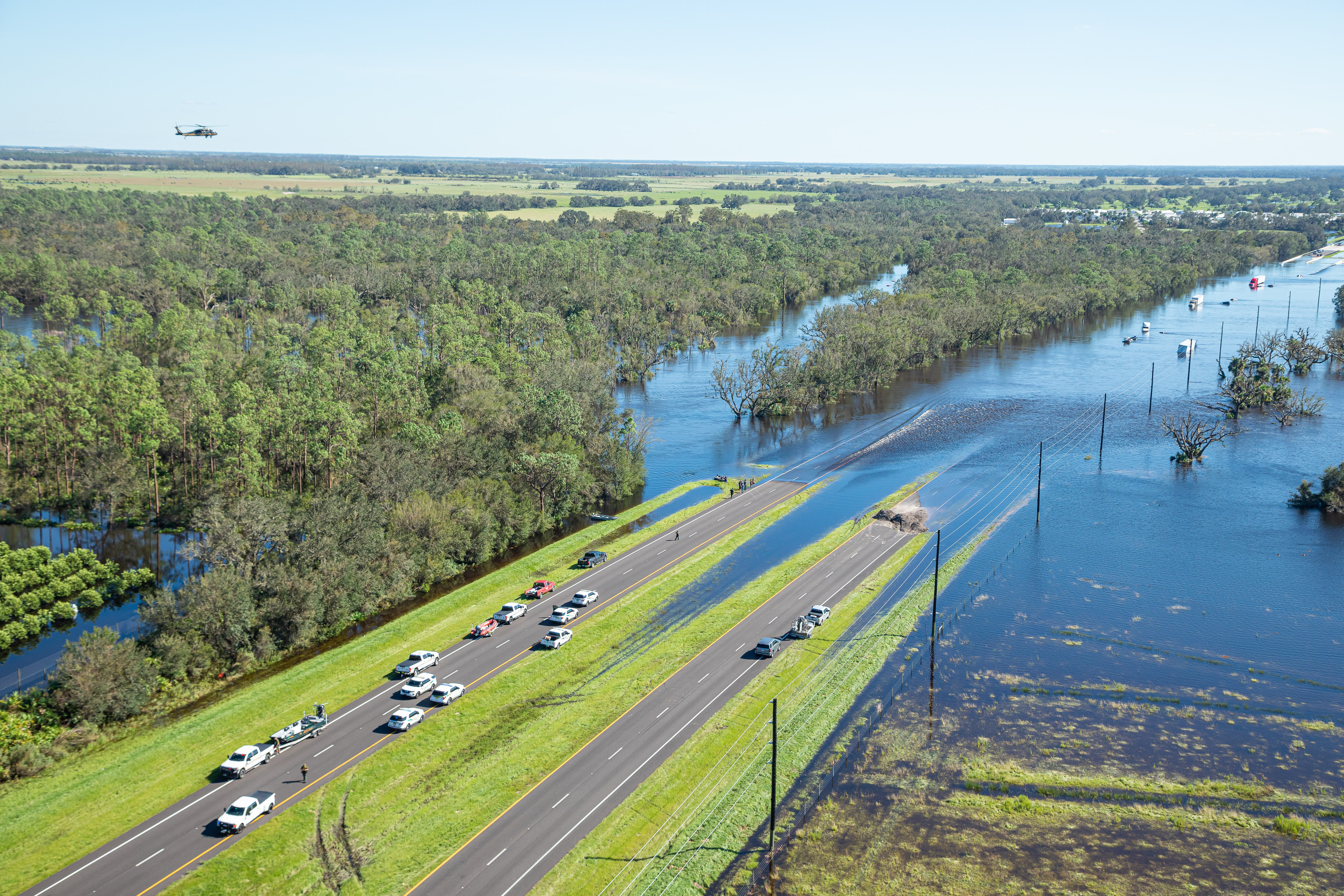
U.S. 17 flooded at Charlie Creek in Hardee County

Across Hardee County, there were 500 miles (800 km) of roads maintained by the county affected by the storm, including three collapsed bridges. Strong winds also resulted in a widespread downing of electrical poles, trees and tree limbs, road signs, and traffic signals. Consequently, there were significant disruptions in communication and electrical services; falling debris blocked many roadways.

Strong winds in Okeechobee County caused minor damage to 113 structures, major damage to 35 structures, and the destruction of 2 structures. Damages there reached about $1.4 million. Martin County reported mostly isolated wind impacts, which included damage to a mobile home and a tree falling onto a residence at a fishing camp along Lake Okeechobee. Along the coast, erosion damages totaled about $6 million. Hundreds of sea turtle eggs were destroyed and scattered across the Fort Pierce beach. Ian wrought little structural impacts in Indian River County, although a loss of up to 100,000 cu yd (76,000 m^{3}) of sand was reported, with a replacement expected to cost nearly $4 million. In Osceola County, severe flooding affected or damaged some 900 businesses and 3,200 dwellings, leading to around $148 million in private property damages. The worst of the floods in the county occurred near Lake Center and in parts of Kissimmee and St. Cloud.

Most neighborhoods in Orlando were flooded as many of the city's numerous lakes overflowed, with the city receiving 14 in (360 mm) of rain. About 250 people were rescued. Heavy rain led to severe flooding in a Disney World resort hotel. Disney suffered an estimated $65 million in economic losses from the storm. Nearby, one ride sustained structural damage at Universal Orlando. This heavy rain contributed to September 2022 being the wettest month on record for Orlando, and combined with Hurricane Nicole in November, led to Orlando recording their wettest meteorological autumn on record in 2022. Orlando International Airport recorded wind gusts of up to 74 mph (119 km/h). Near the University of Central Florida, hundreds of students were displaced after several nearby off-campus apartment complexes flooded. Property damages in Orange County were estimated at $206 million. A 13 mi (21 km) stretch of Florida's Turnpike was closed as well. In Seminole County, extensive floods occurred in areas adjacent to the Little Wekiva River in Altamonte Springs, the St. Johns River at Lake Harney and in Sanford, and the larger and smaller branches of the Econlockhatchee River near Oviedo. Ian destroyed 2 structures, caused major damage to 1,076 structures, and inflicted minor impacts on 580 others. Damages in Seminole County totaled about $241 million. Heavy precipitation inundated many areas along the St. Johns River in Lake County, particularly around Astor. The cyclone caused minor damage to 61 structures and major impacts to 49 others, with damages in the county estimated at $4.5 million. Severe flooding also occurred to the east in Volusia County, especially adjacent to Lake Monroe and the St. Johns River. Along the coast, the storm surge caused extensive impacts to seawalls in the vicinity of Daytona Beach. In New Smyrna Beach, about 180 residents had to be evacuated due to rising floodwaters, with the coastal town receiving almost 21 in (530 mm) of rain according to a preliminary report released by the National Weather Service. Bunnell requested that citizens ceased using non-essential water uses as their manholes were overflowing with rainwater. Around 247,000 customers lost power during the storm in Volusia County alone. The hurricane caused minor impacts to 1,197 structures, major impacts to 181 structures, and the destruction of 40 others. Damages in Volusia County were estimated at $128 million. Near June Park to the west of Melbourne, Ian spawned a weak EF0 tornado that damaged only trees and no buildings. Kennedy Space Center received wind gusts as high as 108 mph (174 km/h), but only minor damage occurred. Storm surge and high tides in Brevard County caused about $7 million in damage to dunes and beach crossovers. In Lake Wales, Florida, the 17 in (430 mm) of rain exceeded the threshold for a one-in-1,000 year event.

=== Elsewhere ===
Portions of the First Coast experienced strong winds, heavy rains, and significant storm surge heights that rivaled those observed during Hurricane Irma. In Flagler County, storm surge and high tides substantially damaged the Flagler Beach pier, rendered a few coastal roads impassable, and flooded home in Flagler Beach, lab buildings in Marineland, and a restaurant in Bunnell. Heavy precipitation and storm surge in St. Johns County flooded several roads in St. Augustine and resulted in the temporary closure of the Bridge of Lions. Floodwaters entered some homes in the Davis Shores neighborhood of Anastasia Island. In Duval County, several locations reported storm surge inundation, including along the Intracoastal Waterway and in Jacksonville's Riverside neighborhood. 22,000 power outages occurred, and isolated wind damage also occurred, such as several trees downed at Naval Air Station Jacksonville, some of which struck homes, displacing two families. In Nassau County, the storm surge resulted in damage to Fernandina Beach High School and the Fernandina Beach marina and inundated numerous roads on Piney Island near the Amelia River. Abnormally high tides, storm surge, and tropical-storm-force winds in Putnam County caused flooding in areas by Lake George and the St. Johns River, with water entering dozens of residences in Fruitland, Satsuma, and Welaka, with the St. John's River rising 2.7 ft (0.82 m).

== Aftermath ==
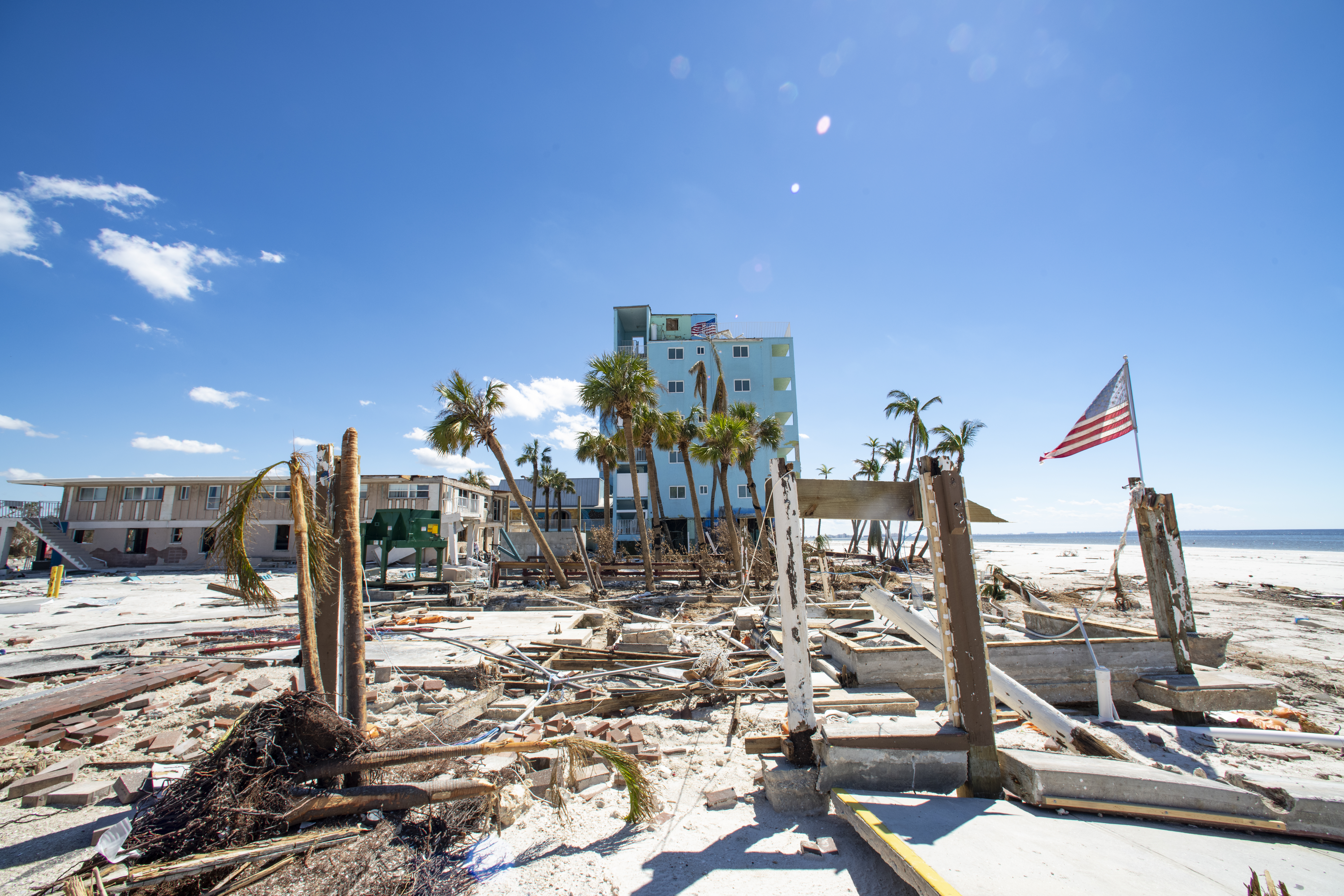
An American flag stands in Fort Myers Beach, Florida in the aftermath of Ian

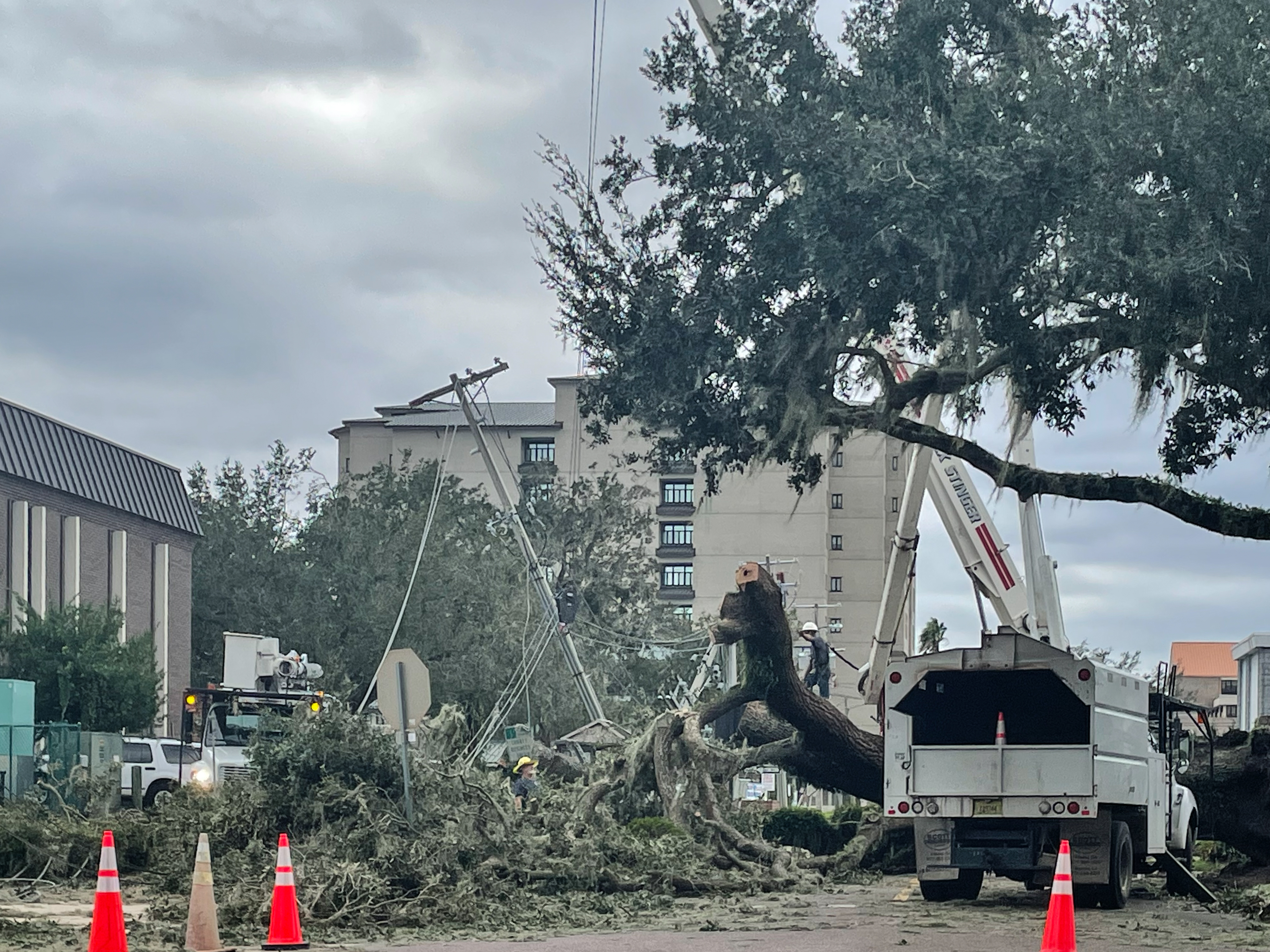
Downed trees and cleanup efforts in Bartow, Florida

Soon after the conditions improved in impacted parts of Florida, search and rescue teams, first responders, and utility workers from un-impacted parts of Florida and across the country deployed to the area. The American Red Cross mobilized and began to provide shelter and supplies to those who needed it as well. Various other International, federal and local organizations also mobilized to help spread donations throughout affected populations in the form of both monetary and physical donations. On October 3, The Guardian reported 10,000 people remained unaccounted for. However, the next day, FEMA's statement did not include numbers about people remaining unaccounted for.

There were sporadic reports of looting and burglaries at several businesses in Lee County, Florida; alleged thefts of non-essential items such as sports apparel and athletic shoes during the height of the storm prompted officials to enforce a curfew in the county. Door-to-door scams posing as charities were carried out across the nation. According to DeSantis, Florida was working with SpaceX CEO Elon Musk to use the Starlink satellite Internet service to help restore communication across the state.

At least eight school districts suffered closures as a result of Ian. The Lee County and DeSoto County Public School Districts reopened on October 17. The Charlotte County Public School District reopened October 18. Sarasota County Schools were closed due to damage from storm, with classes resuming on October 10 for most of the county, while several schools that sustained more damage remaining closed until October 17.

Critics have noted that federally subsidized flood insurance is one of the reasons that people continue to move to hurricane-prone areas of Florida. Since the National Flood Insurance Program (NFIP) began, millions of people moved to Florida in the past 50 years into areas that were part of Hurricane Ian's path in part, critics note, due to the subsidized flood insurance offered by the federal government and insurance companies. NBC News described most of the deaths as preventable, blaming a lack of communication on the government's side and care on the citizen's side.

Lee County also saw a sharp rise in infections and death from flesh-eating bacteria that live in warm brackish water. By October 18, 2022, 29 cases and four deaths had been recorded since landfall due to infection from Vibrio vulnificus, at least one of whom was from out of state. At least one Lee County man was infected with Mycobacterium haemophilum. In Sarasota Bay, significant ocean stratification occurred, which took over a month for the bay to recover from, and resulted in some fish dying and fewer dolphin sightings.

Around 15% of the bees in the United States, which were found in Florida, were affected by Ian. Upwards of 150,000 bee hives were destroyed in the storm. Surviving bees were malnourished due to Brazilian peppertrees, which bloom in the autumn, being stripped.

Weeks later several coast side condominiums and hotels damaged by Ian in Volusia County were deemed unsafe and evacuated as Hurricane Nicole approached on November 10. Many structures fell into the ocean.

On February 10, 2024, a fire station in Sanibel was demolished after suffering wind and flood damage. The station moved temporarily into a mobile home that month.

The Tampa Bay Rays were forced to move their practice facilities for the 2023 preseason due to extensive damage in Port Charlotte.

On September 30, Biscayne National Park and portions of Everglades National Park re-opened after having sustained little damage during Hurricane Ian. Also on September 30, Jacksonville International Airport, Orlando International Airport, Tampa International Airport and Sarasota Bradenton International Airport reopened. Dry Tortugas National Park resumed seaplane tours on October 2 and ferry tours on October 10. Some state parks remained closed for longer periods of time. Myakka State Park did not reopen until December 19, 2022. At Cayo Costa State Park, the location of direct landfall, the park remained closed until October 25, 2023.

Following the storm, a total of 26 states, including New York, New Jersey, Georgia and Tennessee, gave assistance to Florida.
