= Puzzle Lake =

Lake in the state of Florida, United States

- Location within Florida Location within the United States
- Location: Seminole / Volusia counties, Florida, United States
- Coordinates: 28°40′35″N 81°01′19″W
- Primary inflows: Econlockhatchee River, St. Johns River
- Primary outflows: St. Johns River
- Basin countries: United States
- Surface area: 1,300 acres (530 ha)

Puzzle Lake is a lake near Geneva in Seminole County, Florida. It forms the border of Volusia and Seminole counties. It is one of the lakes that make up the St. Johns River system. 1,627 yards (1,488 m) north of the lake is the mouth of the tributary, the Econlockhatchee River. It has a surface area of 1,300 acres (530 ha). 3.2 miles (5.1 km) downriver is Lake Harney, the start of the river becoming a wetland (upriver). It will become a narrow river again past Lake Poinsett in Brevard County. The lake is named after this because the navigable portions of the lake change seasonally depending on the amount of rainfall. When the waters recede, previously known boat routes can be hindered by new, submersed, sandbars and deep water channels that are completely different from the year before.

== Geography ==
On the lakes eastern boundary is Volusia and Brevard counties. To the north is the Econlockhatchee River and Lake Harney. To the northwest is Geneva, and to the south is Christmas.

Boaters beware of numerous fence posts and barbed wire.

== See also ==
- Econlockhatchee River
- State Road 46
- St. Johns River
- Lake Harney – 3.2 miles (5.1 km) downriver
- Ruth Lake (Florida) – 5 miles (8.0 km) upriver
