= Black Hammock =

Black Hammock may refer to

== Places ==
United States

- Black Hammock, Florida, an unincorporated community and census-designated place in Seminole County
- Black Hammock Island, island in Jacksonville, Florida
- Black Hammock Wilderness Area, area in Seminole County, Florida
