= Black Hammock, Florida =

- Unincorporated community
- Location within Florida Location within the United States
- Coordinates: 28°42′39″N 81°10′48″W
- Country: United States
- State: Florida
- County: Seminole

Area
  - Total: 10.911 sq mi (28.26 km^{2})
  - Land: 10.911 sq mi (28.26 km^{2})
  - Water: 0 sq mi (0 km^{2})
- Elevation: 10 ft (3.0 m)

Population (2010)
  - Total: 1,144
  - Density: 104.8/sq mi (40.48/km^{2})
- Time zone: UTC-5 (Eastern (EST))
  - Summer (DST): UTC-4 (EDT)
- Area codes: 321, 407/689
- GNIS feature ID: 2583330

Black Hammock is an unincorporated community and census-designated place in Seminole County, Florida, United States on the southern shore of Lake Jesup. As of the 2020 census, Black Hammock had a population of 1,195.

== Geography ==
According to the U.S. Census Bureau, the community has an area of 10.911 square miles (28.26 km^{2}), all of it land.

== Demographics ==
Historical population
Census	Pop.	Note	%±
2010	1,144		—
2020	1,195		4.5%
U.S. Decennial Census

Black Hammock first appeared as a census designated place in the 2010 U.S. census.

=== Racial and ethnic composition ===
Black Hammock CDP, Florida – Racial and ethnic composition Note: the US Census treats Hispanic/Latino as an ethnic category. This table excludes Latinos from the racial categories and assigns them to a separate category. Hispanics/Latinos may be of any race.
Race / Ethnicity (NH = Non-Hispanic)	Pop 2010	Pop 2020	% 2010	% 2020
White alone (NH)	966	940	84.44%	78.66%
Black or African American alone (NH)	34	29	2.97%	2.43%
Native American or Alaska Native alone (NH)	2	0	0.17%	0.00%
Asian alone (NH)	16	30	1.40%	2.51%
Native Hawaiian or Pacific Islander alone (NH)	0	0	0.00%	0.00%
Other race alone (NH)	3	6	0.26%	0.50%
Mixed race or Multiracial (NH)	15	59	1.31%	4.94%
Hispanic or Latino (any race)	108	131	9.44%	10.96%
Total	1,144	1,195	100.00%	100.00%

=== 2020 census ===
As of the 2020 census, Black Hammock had a population of 1,195. The median age was 46.4 years. 21.1% of residents were under the age of 18 and 19.7% of residents were 65 years of age or older. For every 100 females there were 99.8 males, and for every 100 females age 18 and over there were 98.5 males age 18 and over.

0.0% of residents lived in urban areas, while 100.0% lived in rural areas.

There were 412 households in Black Hammock, of which 25.2% had children under the age of 18 living in them. Of all households, 63.6% were married-couple households, 17.7% were households with a male householder and no spouse or partner present, and 14.8% were households with a female householder and no spouse or partner present. About 19.0% of all households were made up of individuals and 9.0% had someone living alone who was 65 years of age or older.

There were 438 housing units, of which 5.9% were vacant. The homeowner vacancy rate was 1.3% and the rental vacancy rate was 8.0%.

Racial composition as of the 2020 census
Race	Number	Percent
White	973	81.4%
Black or African American	29	2.4%
American Indian and Alaska Native	3	0.3%
Asian	31	2.6%
Native Hawaiian and Other Pacific Islander	0	0.0%
Some other race	28	2.3%
Two or more races	131	11.0%

== See also ==
- Black Hammock Wilderness Area
- Little Big Econ State Forest
