= Lake Proctor =

Lake Proctor may refer to several places:

- Proctor Lake in West Central Texas
- Lake Proctor Wilderness Area in Seminole County, FL
