= Lake Proctor Wilderness Area =

Wilderness area in Florida, United States

- Location within Florida Location within the United States
- Location: Seminole County, Florida
- Nearest city: Geneva
- Coordinates: 28°43′57″N 81°05′45″W
- Area: 475 acres (1.92 km^{2})
- Governing body: Seminole County
- Website: web.archive.org/web/20111106103112/http://www.seminolecountyfl.gov/parksrec/naturallands/proctor.aspx

The Lake Proctor Wilderness Area is a 475-acre (1.92 km^{2}) wooded site located in east Seminole County, Florida, United States, near the town of Geneva and to the west of Lake Harney. It can be found by taking State Road 46 east from Sanford, Florida and following it to the entrance on the left (north) side of SR 46 approximately 1-mile (1.6 km) east of the intersection with CR 426. The area includes a loop-type trail that is approximately 6 miles (9.7 km) in length. Habitats such as sand pine scrub, pine flatwoods, sandhill and bayhead swamp are highlighted in the area. Wildlife observed on this site includes the wood duck, white-tailed deer, red fox and Florida worm lizard. Benches are provided at several locations.

This site's variety of habitats and trail system make it a popular destination for local equestrians, mountain bikers, hikers, boy scouts and other outdoor enthusiasts.

== History ==
This site was purchased through the Seminole County Natural Lands Program which was put in place in 1990 by the Citizens and Board of County Commissioners through recognition of the role conservation and natural resources play in promoting and protecting a quality community.

== Education ==
Seminole County's Leisure Services uses the area as an outside classroom through the Green Seminole Project. They cover topics that include prescribed fire, wildlife management and water quality.

== See also ==
- Lake Harney
- State Road 46
- Geneva, Florida
