= Turkey Creek (Econlockhatchee River tributary) =

Creek in Florida, United States of America

Turkey Creek is a creek and tributary of the Econlockhatchee River located in the community of Narcoossee in Southeast Orlando, in the U.S. State of Florida. The source of the 3-mile (4.8 km) river is Turkey Creek Bay, which is the northern beginning of the Econlockhatchee River Swamp that extends to Lake Conlin, the source of the Econlockhatchee River. From Turkey Creek Bay, the creek flows north and goes under Wewahootee Road and then State Road 528, commonly known as the Beachline Expressway. A tributary of the creek itself, the Green Branch, joins Turkey Creek at about 1,100 feet (340 m) before Turkey Creek joins the Econlockhatchee at 28°27′39.7″N 81°06′54.2″W.

== See also ==
- List of rivers of Florida
