= Black Hammock Wilderness Area =

Protected area in Florida, United States

- IUCN category V (protected landscape/seascape)
- Location within Florida Location within the United States
- Location: Seminole County, Florida
- Nearest city: Oviedo, Florida
- Coordinates: 28.699408°N 081.159266°W
- Area: 700 acres (280 ha)

The Black Hammock Wilderness Area is a 700-acre (2.8 km^{2}) joint purchase between Seminole County, Florida and the St. Johns River Water Management District. It was acquired as part of a comprehensive effort to preserve significant habitat along the shores of Lake Jesup. This particular area also helps protect important recharge areas for the Geneva Bubble (local aquifer). Additionally, the wetland habitats of this property filter water on its way to Lake Jesup

The wilderness area includes a round-trip hike of approximately 4.5 miles (7.2 km) of trails, through habitats such as mixed hardwood swamp, sand pine scrub and pine flatwoods. Wildlife observed in the wilderness area includes the barred owl, white-tailed deer, bobcat and eastern hognose snake. The includes a boardwalk and trail system designed for local equestrians, mountain bikers, hikers, photographers and other outdoor enthusiasts.

The main parking area for the Black Hammock Wilderness Area is on CR 426, at the Barr Street entrance of the Little Big Econ State Forest in Geneva, Florida.

== See also ==
- Little Big Econ State Forest
- St. Johns River Water Management District
- Geneva, Florida
