= Geneva, Florida =

- CDP
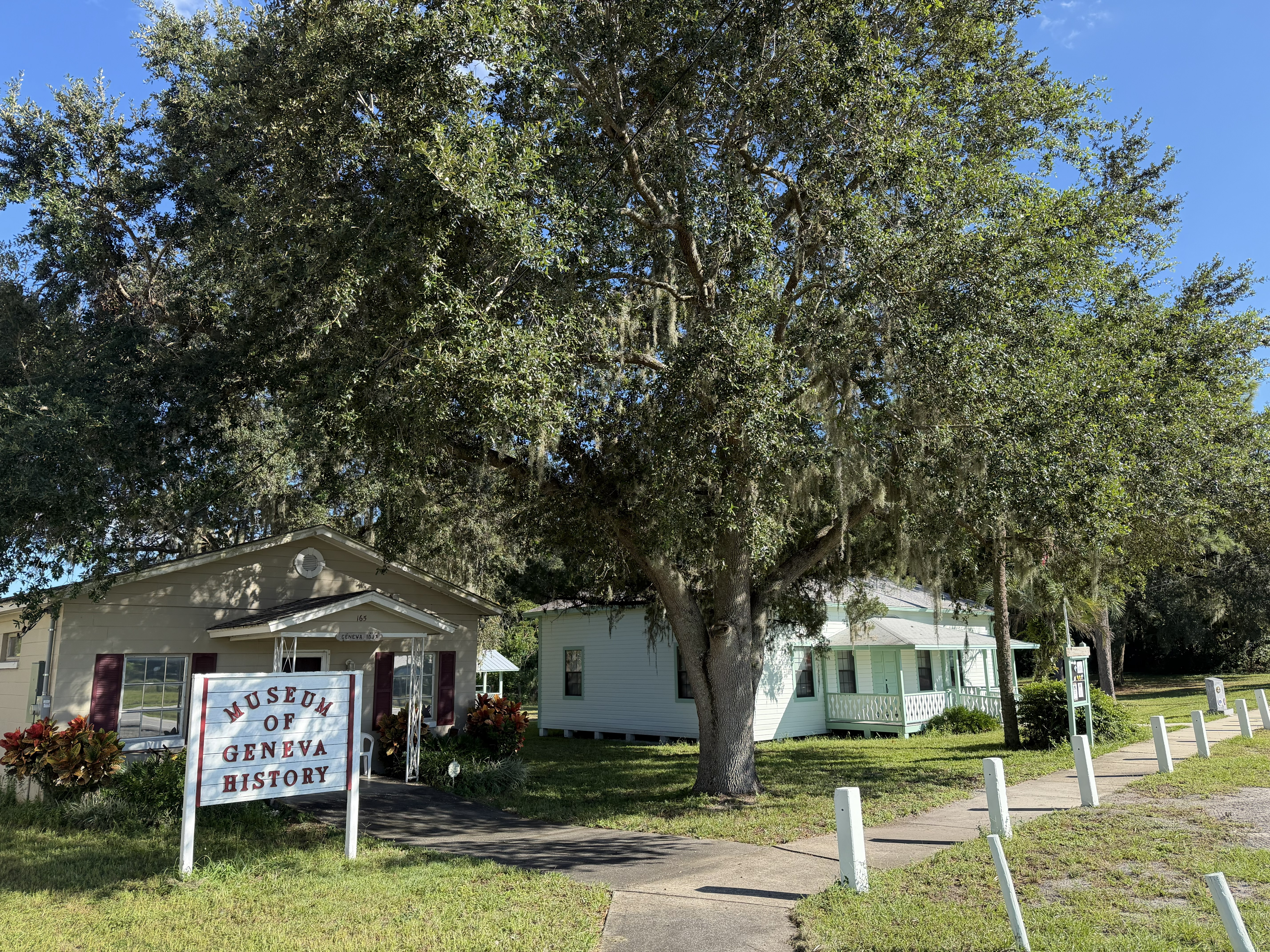
- Museum of Geneva History in Geneva, Florida

- Location in Seminole County and the state of Florida
- Coordinates: 28°44′16″N 81°06′51″W
- Country: United States
- State: Florida
- County: Seminole

Area
  - Total: 13.65 sq mi (35.35 km^{2})
  - Land: 12.73 sq mi (32.97 km^{2})
  - Water: 0.92 sq mi (2.37 km^{2})
- Elevation: 69 ft (21 m)

Population (2020)
  - Total: 2,913
  - Density: 228.8/sq mi (88.34/km^{2})
- Time zone: UTC-5 (Eastern (EST))
  - Summer (DST): UTC-4 (EDT)
- ZIP code: 32732
- Area codes: 407, 689
- FIPS code: 12-25750
- GNIS feature ID: 2402520

Geneva is a community, census-designated place and unincorporated area in Seminole County, Florida, United States, with zip code 32732. The population was 2,913 at the 2020 Census. It is part of the Orlando–Kissimmee–Sanford Metropolitan Statistical Area.

The Little-Big Econ State Forest is located in Geneva, in which, the Big and Little Econlockhatchee Rivers are found.

== History ==
John and William Bartram first documented Geneva's history in 1765–66. Since then, there have been several other documentations: Anthropologist Daniel Britton in 1850, scientists of Harvard University in 1875 and by an Archeological Cultural Resources Study and an Architectural Resources Study.

The Geneva Cemetery is located on a piece of land that was donated by Progar Debogory. Debogory was the head of one of the Russian families that settled in the Geneva area in the 1800s. There are currently 17 U.S. Civil War soldiers buried in the Geneva Cemetery, 15 of these soldiers served in the confederacy, including Lewis Thornton Powell, a member of the Booth Conspiracy, and only 2 served in the union. There were originally 18 soldiers buried, however one soldier's remains were removed by his family and placed in a different cemetery.

Early schools in Geneva were originally located in the homes of local residents. The first formal school was built in 1874 on land that was also donated by Progar Debogory. A new one-room school was built by 1903 in replacement of the original schoolhouse. In 1924, a new building was built out of bricks and had 4 rooms to accommodate more students. In 1941, principal W.L. Seig developed a unique 4-H program focused on the development of home economics and farming skills. This program was sponsored by Rollins College and this accomplishment is acknowledged and praised in the "History of the Seminole County Public Schools". In 1988, an elementary school was built surrounding the old brick schoolhouse. The old schoolhouse was preserved for the community and in 1995 it served as a family resource center. Finally in 2008, the building was dedicated to the community to serve as a rural heritage center.

== Geography ==
According to the United States Census Bureau, the CDP has a total area of 32.2 km^{2} (12.4 mi^{2}), of which 29.5 km^{2} (11.4 mi^{2}) is land and 2.7 km^{2} (1.0 mi^{2}) (8.37%) is water.

Geneva is on State Road 46, located between Lake Harney and Lake Jesup.

== Demographics ==
Historical population
Census	Pop.	Note	%±
2020	2,913		—
U.S. Decennial Census

=== 2020 census ===
As of the 2020 census, Geneva had a population of 2,913. The median age was 46.5 years. 18.9% of residents were under the age of 18 and 18.1% of residents were 65 years of age or older. For every 100 females there were 107.2 males, and for every 100 females age 18 and over there were 108.6 males age 18 and over.

0.0% of residents lived in urban areas, while 100.0% lived in rural areas.

There were 1,044 households in Geneva, of which 29.5% had children under the age of 18 living in them. Of all households, 63.8% were married-couple households, 13.0% were households with a male householder and no spouse or partner present, and 17.3% were households with a female householder and no spouse or partner present. About 14.0% of all households were made up of individuals and 8.1% had someone living alone who was 65 years of age or older.

There were 1,113 housing units, of which 6.2% were vacant. The homeowner vacancy rate was 1.3% and the rental vacancy rate was 0.0%.

Racial composition as of the 2020 census
Race	Number	Percent
White	2,540	87.2%
Black or African American	53	1.8%
American Indian and Alaska Native	12	0.4%
Asian	47	1.6%
Native Hawaiian and Other Pacific Islander	0	0.0%
Some other race	42	1.4%
Two or more races	219	7.5%
Hispanic or Latino (of any race)	204	7.0%

=== 2010 census ===
As of the census of 2010, there were 2,940 people and 1,034 households residing in the CDP. The population density was 81.32/mi^{2}.

Geneva, Florida - Overview	2010 Census	
	Counts	Percentages
Total Population	2,940	100.00%
Population by Race
White	2,700	91.84%
Asian	70	2.38%
Black or African American	49	1.67%
American Indian or Alaska Native	14	0.48%
Native Hawaiian or Other Pacific	0	0%
Other race	39	1.33%
Two or more races	68	2.31%
Population by Hispanic or Latino Origin (of any race)		
Not Hispanic or Latino Origin	2,785	94.73%
Hispanic or Latino Origin	155	5.27%
Population by Gender		
Male	1,498	50.95%
Female	1,442	49.05%
Population by Age		
0 – 4 years	122	4.15%
5 – 17 years	520	17.69%
18 – 64 years	1,934	65.78%
65+ years	364	12.38%

=== Income ===
As of 2010–2014, the average per-capita income of Geneva is $29,671, which is higher than the state average of $26,499 and is about the same as the national average of $28,555. Geneva median household income is $76,818, which has grown by 57.14% since 2000. The median household income growth rate is much higher than the state average rate of 21.62% and is much higher than the national average rate of 27.36%. On average Geneva residents spend 28.4 minutes per day commuting to work, which is higher than the state average of 26.1 minutes and is higher than the national average of 25.7 minutes.

Income	Geneva, FL	Florida	U.S.
Mean Per Capita	$29,671	$26,499	$28,555
Median Individual Worker	$31,484	$27,404	$30,815
(male)	$43,854	$31,136	$36,116
(female)	$22,019	$24,898	$25,692
Median Household	$76,818	$47,212	$53,482
Mean Household	$89,227	$67,143	$74,596

== Education ==
- Geneva Elementary
