= National Weather Service Tampa, Florida =

- Types: branch
- Location: Ruskin
- Country: United States
- Website: www.weather.gov/tbw/

A map of the Tampa National Weather Service county warning area/area of responsibility.

The National Weather Service Tampa, Florida is a local office of the National Weather Service responsible for monitoring weather conditions in west-central Florida, United States. The office is located in Ruskin, and currently has 25 employees, including 16 meteorologists. 15 counties are in the service's responsibility.
