= Lake Conlin =

Lake in the state of Florida, United States

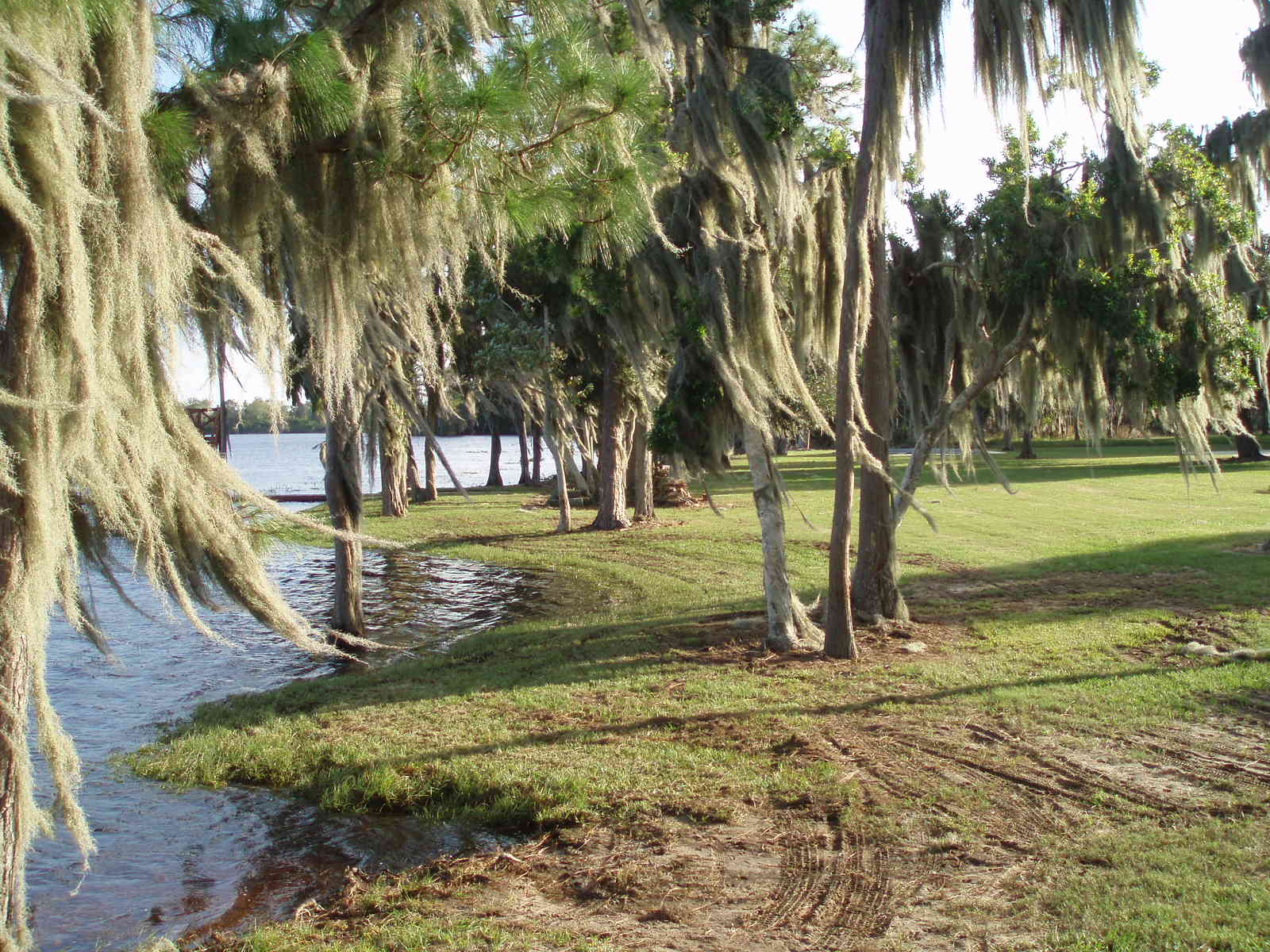

- Location within Florida Location within the United States
- Location: Osceola County, Florida
- Coordinates: 28°14′24″N 81°07′07″W
- Primary outflows: Econlockhatchee River
- Basin countries: United States

Lake Conlin is a lake in Osceola County, Florida, in the United States.

It was formerly known as Lake X, and was used for testing new speedboat designs.

== History ==
A secret testing ground for Mercury Marine, which was founded by Carl Kiekhaefer. Originally referred to as Lake X, it served as a secluded facility for testing high-speed boats and engine performance from its opening in 1957 until 2004. This site encompassed 12,000 acres of land and 1,440 acres of private water, making it an ideal location for rigorous marine research and development.

During its operational years, Lake X was renowned for significant events, including a historic 50,000-mile endurance run conducted by Mercury Marine in 1957. This grueling test involved two boats running continuously on a closed course.
