= Little Big Econ State Forest =

Forest reserve in Florida, United States

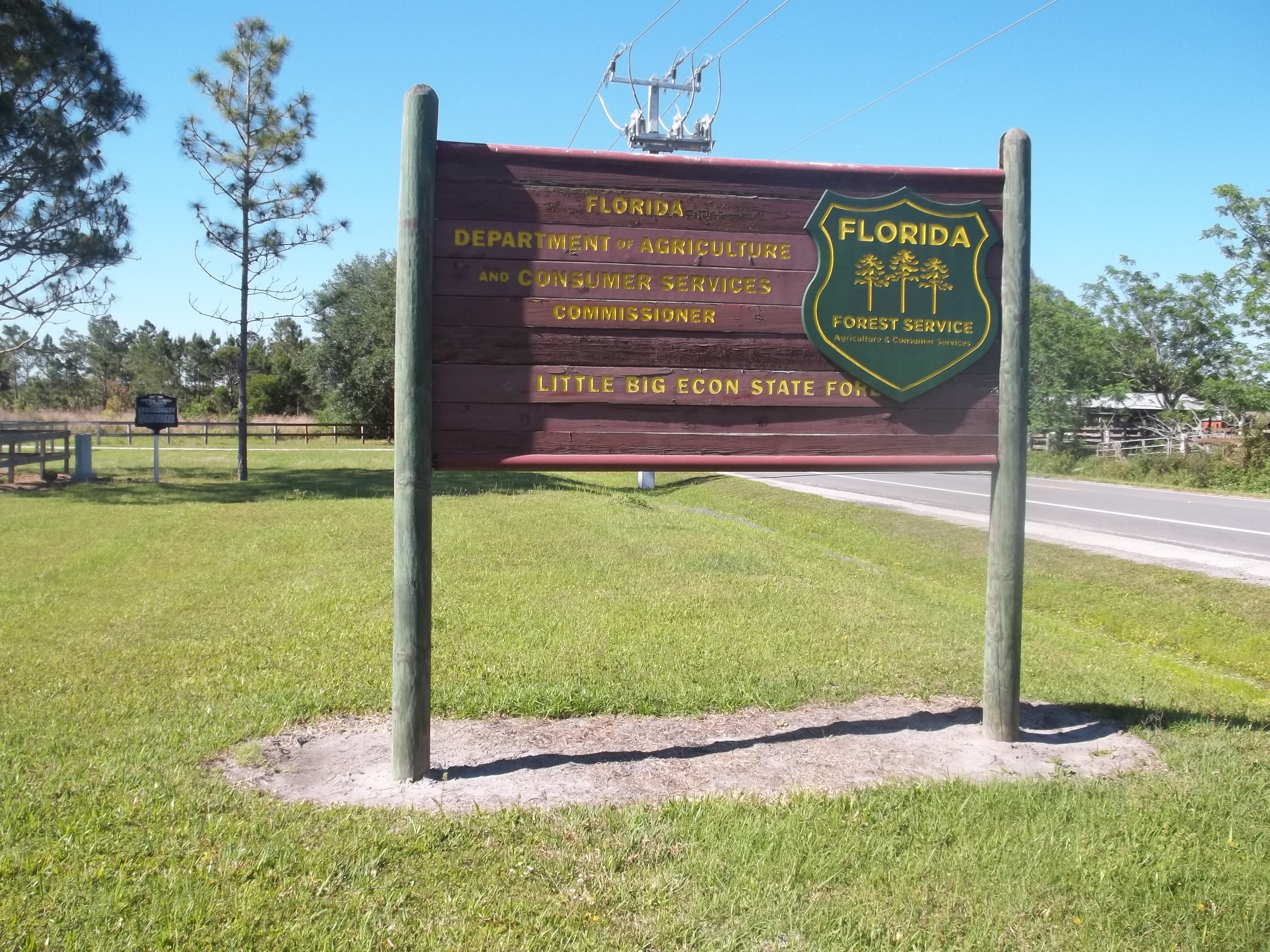
- Sign for the Little Big Econ State Forest on Snow Hill Road

- Map of Florida
- Location: Seminole County, Florida
- Nearest city: Oviedo
- Coordinates: 28°41′8″N 081°06′57″W
- Area: 5,048 acres (20.43 km^{2})
- Established: 1990
- Governing body: Florida Department of Environmental Protection

The Little Big Econ State Forest is a state forest in the U.S. state of Florida. The 5,048 acres (20.43 km^{2}) forest is located in Central Florida, 3.3 miles (5.3 km) east of the downtown Oviedo, on Florida Country Road 426 with forest office on Snow Hill Road in Geneva, Florida. The Kilbee Tract is a smaller non-contiguous section of the park located east of the main forest, along Saint Johns River, the longest river in the state.

The forest's most notable feature is the Econlockhatchee River, an Outstanding Florida Water, that winds east-to-west inside the forest. The protected area of Florida is open for picnicking, bird watching, fishing, hunting, hiking, horseback and mountain bike riding.

== Etymology ==
The name Little Big Econ State Forest comes from combining the names of the Little Econlockhatchee River and the larger Econlockhatchee River, which flow through the forest property.

== Natural features ==
The forest protects wetlands along the Econlockhatchee and St. Johns rivers. Its habitats also include wet prairie, pine flatwoods, sandhill, and scrub.

== Hiking ==
The old Flagler Railroad System used to traverse the central part of the state forest. The trail was originally part of the Florida East Coast Railway's Kissimmee Valley Line, also known as the Okeechobee Branch. What was the old railway is now called the Flagler Trail. Remains of old trestle pilings can still be seen on the river. The Florida National Scenic Trail passes through the state forest and follows the southern portion of the Flagler Trail.

In June 2026, a woman was fatally attacked by an alligator while wading in the Econlockhatchee River.

== Mountain biking ==
Known as Snow Hill among local mountain bikers for the road where the trailhead is on, the forest includes a 12 miles (19 km) single-track bike trail.

== Camping ==
There are no developed campsites or hookups available in the park, only primitive camping. For canoeist, primitive camping is available with special permit.
