= Lake Center (Osceola County, Florida) =

Lake in the state of Florida, United States

- Location within Florida Location within the United States
- Location: Osceola County, Florida
- Coordinates: 28°16′42″N 81°11′29″W
- Type: Lake

Lake Center (also called Center Lake) is a lake in Osceola County, in the U.S. state of Florida.
