= Econlockhatchee River =

River in Osceola, Florida

Econlockhatchee River Econ River
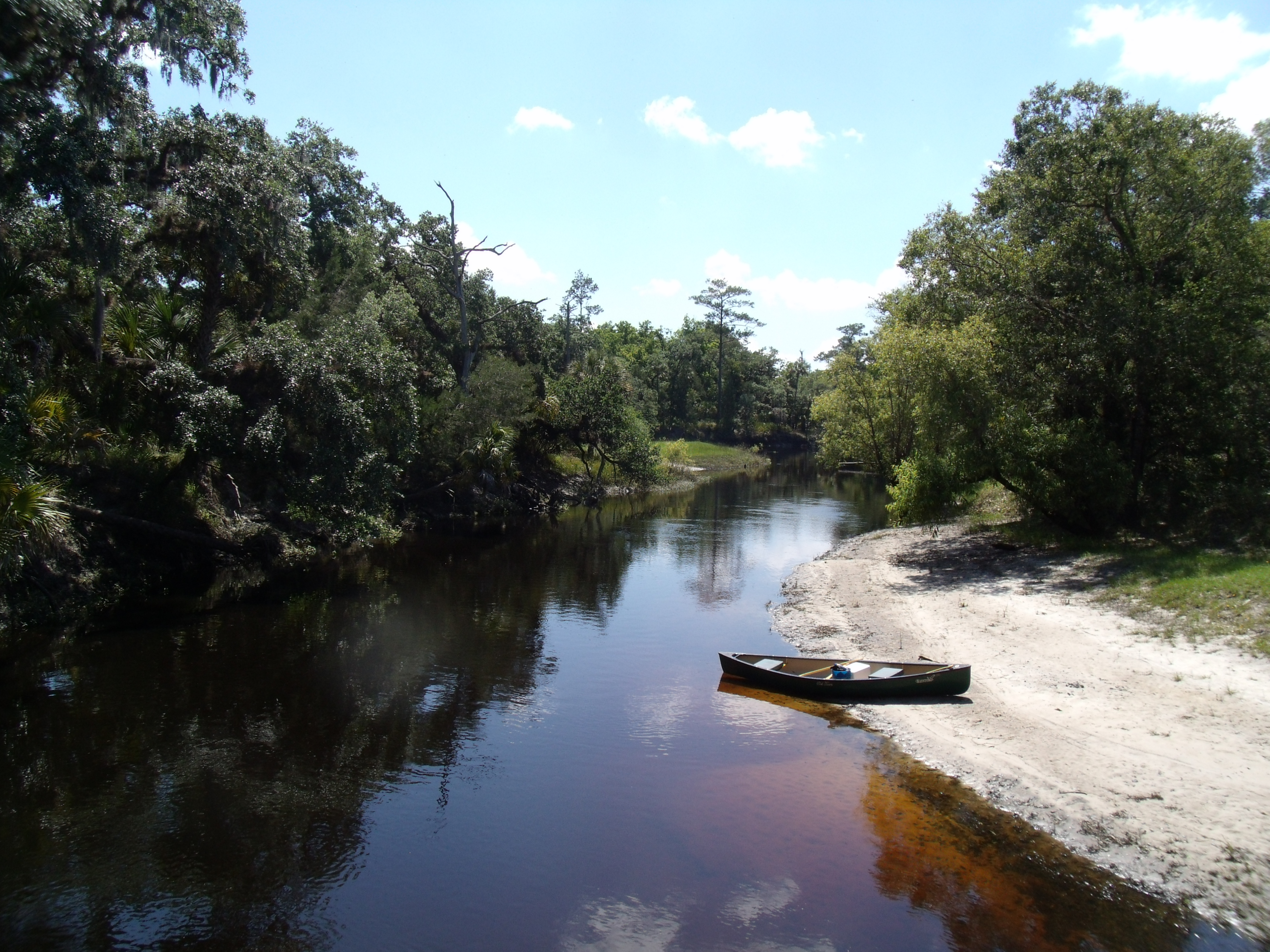
- Econlockhatchee River from the Florida Trail bridge
- Etymology: "Rivers of mounds"

Location
- Country: United States
- Location: Central Florida

Physical characteristics
- Source
  - location: Lake Conlin north of Holopaw
  - coordinates: 28°14′29″N 81°6′31″W
  - elevation: 92 feet (28 m)
- Mouth
  - location: St. Johns River near Puzzle Lake
  - coordinates: 28°42′13″N 81°1′42″W
  - elevation: 3 feet (0.91 m)
- Length: 87.7 km (54.5 mi)
- Basin size: 173,143 acres (700.68 km^{2})

Basin features
- Progression: Ecolockhatchee - Saint Johns River - Atlantic Ocean
- River system: Saint Johns River
- Tributaries
  - left: Disston Canal, Turkey Creek, Little Econlockhatchee River

The Econlockhatchee River (Econ River for short) is an 54.5-mile-long (87.7 km) north-flowing blackwater tributary of the St. Johns River. The Econ River flows through Osceola, Orange, and Seminole counties in Central Florida, just east of the Orlando Metropolitan Area (east of State Road 417). It is a designated Outstanding Florida Waters.

The origin of the river's name is not known definitively. In 1839 the spelling was recorded as “Econ-like Hatchee”. It is theorized that this represents a Muscogee name meaning “earth-mound stream”, with “econ-like” coming from ēkvnv (/iːkaná/), ‘earth, land’, and like (/léyki/), ‘sitting’, plus hvcce (/háčči/), ‘stream’.

The river flows north from its source, Lake Conlin, through the Econlockhatchee River Swamp (see below) south of State Road 528. Near the City of Oviedo, the tributary Little Econlockhatchee River joins, and the river turns east as it flows through the Little Big Econ State Forest. The Econlockhatchee joins the St. Johns River near Puzzle Lake. The river's floodplain is forested for its entire length.

== Econlockhatchee River Swamp ==
The upper course of the river is called the Econlockhatchee River Swamp. Located southeast of Orlando, the swamp is 21 kilometres (13 mi) long, from Lake Conlin to State Road 528. South of State Road 532, the swamp is known as Cat Island Swamp, named after an island near County Road 500A. The river is at its widest (1.6 km) here, bordered by Lake Preston to the west. Seven miles downstream, the river's elevation is 19 metres (62 ft). The Disston Canal joins Lake Mary Jane and Lake Hart to the swamp. Turkey Creek Bay is an arm of the swamp, through which the tributary Turkey Creek flows. North of Wewahootee Road, the Econlockhatchee River leaves the swamp and remains a free-flowing river for the rest of its journey to the St. Johns River.

== List of crossings ==
Bridge	Route	Location	Coordinates
	Snow Hill Road	Oviedo	28°40′40″N 81°06′50″W
	County Road 419	Oviedo	28°39′20″N 81°10′12″W
	County Road 420	Orlando
	State Road 50	Bithlo	28°33′55″N 81°09′16″W
	State Road 528 near Dallas Boulevard	Orlando	28°27′05″N 81°06′28″W
	Wewahootee Road	Orlando	28°25′29″N 81°07′09″W
	County Road 532	Holopaw	28°16′31″N 81°06′33″W

== Gallery ==
=== River views ===
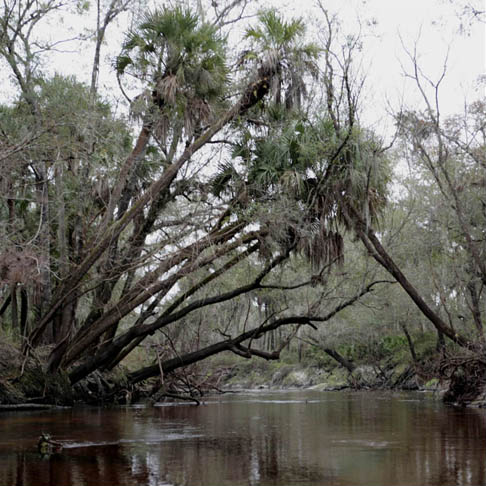

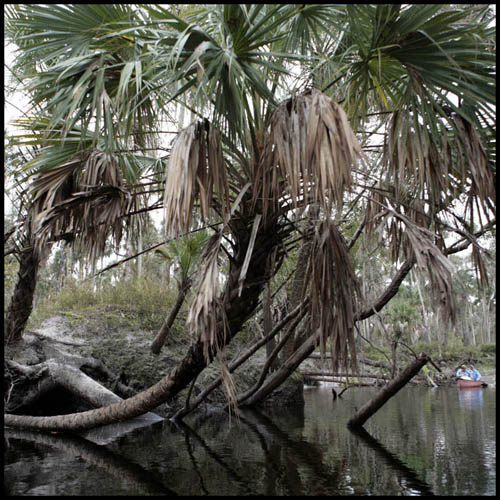

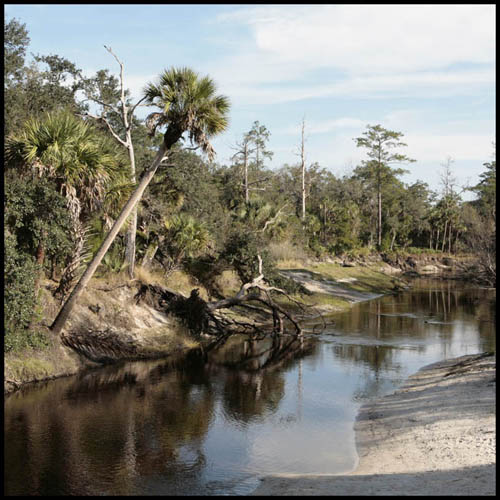

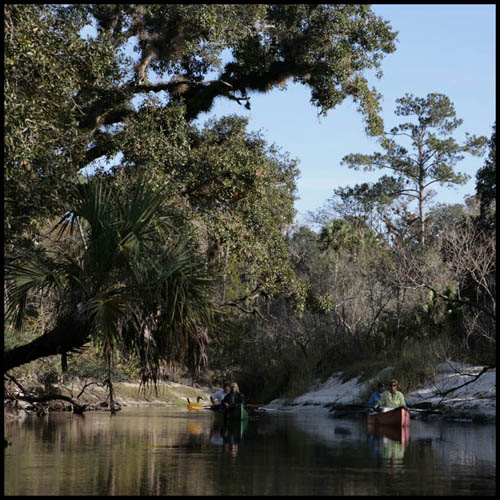

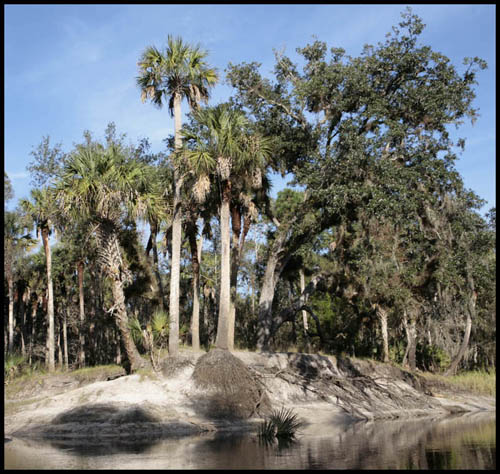

=== Fauna ===
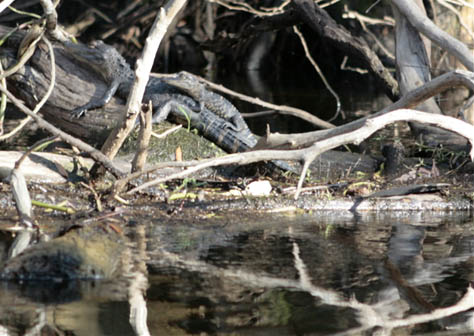
Young alligators along the river bank

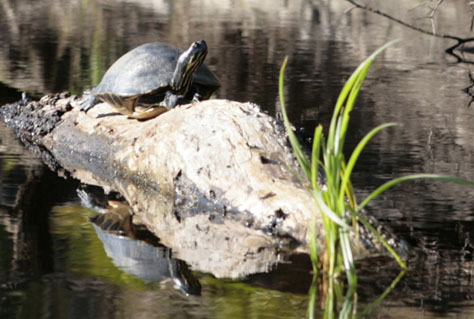
A Florida cooter sunning on top of a log

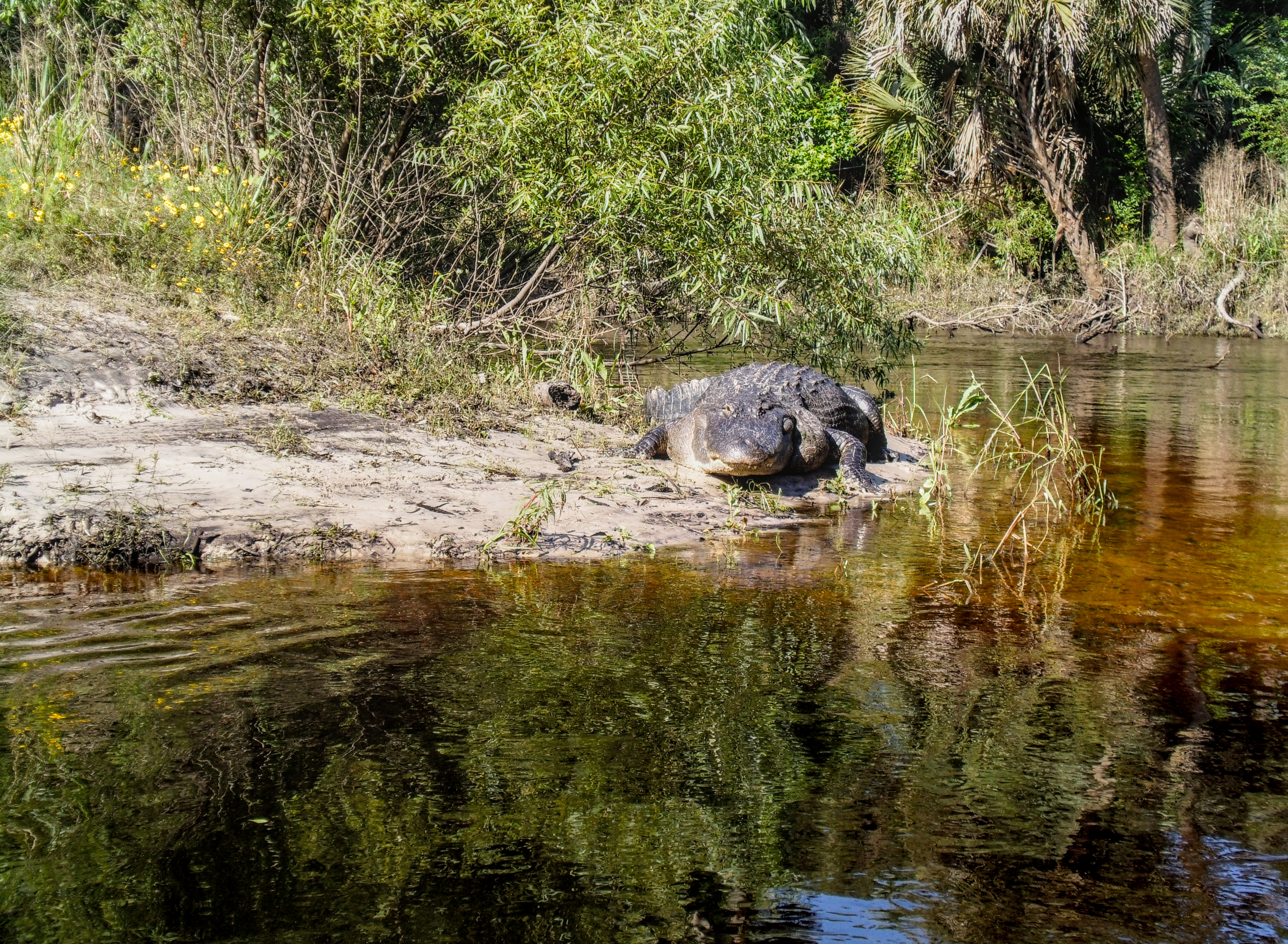

== See also ==
- List of Florida rivers
- Hal Scott Preserve
- Oviedo, Florida
- Wedgefield, Florida formerly known as "Rocket City"
