= Little Econlockhatchee River =

River in Florida, United States

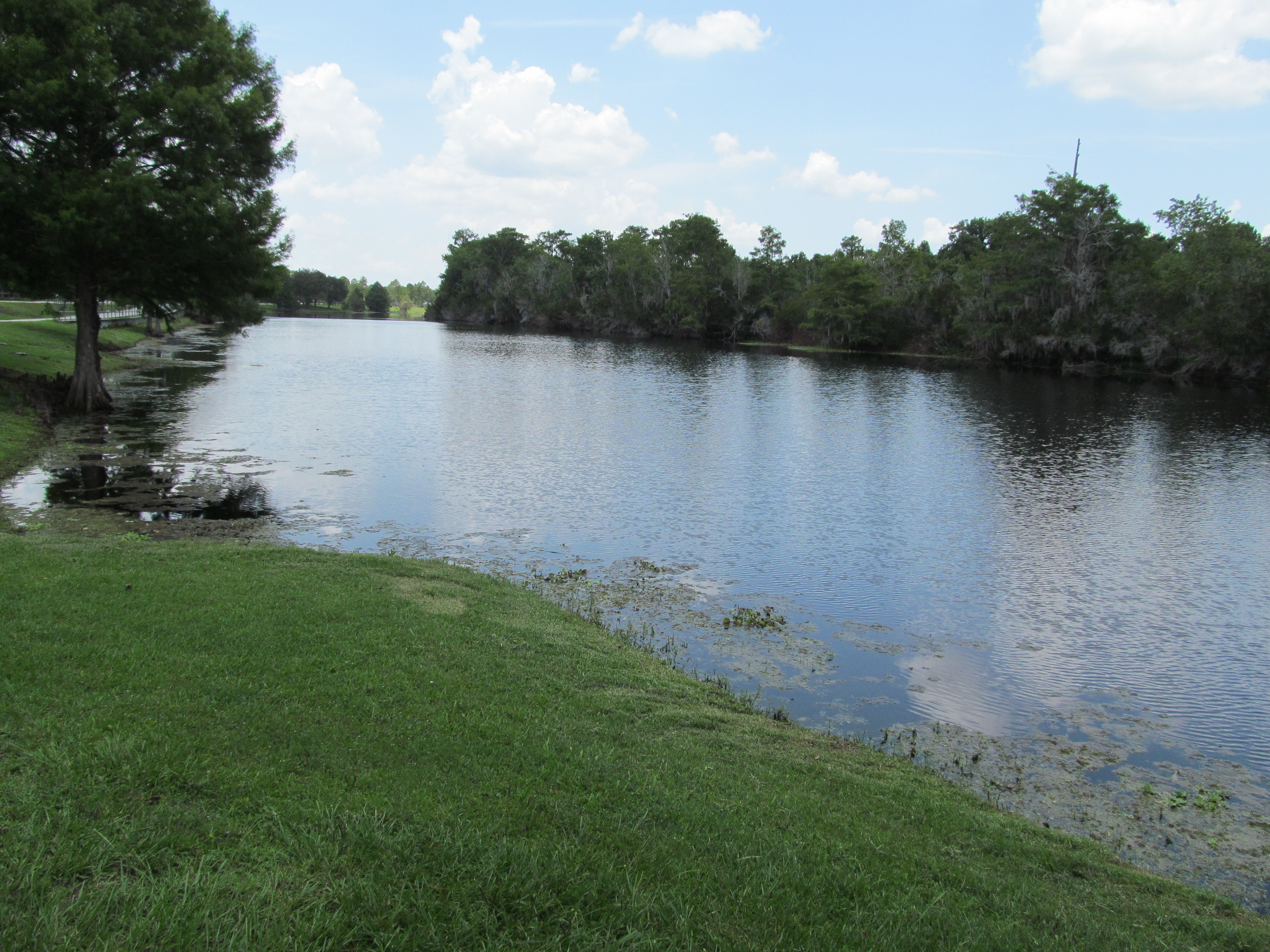
- View from Jay Blanchard Park of the Little Econ River

Location
- Country: United States

Physical characteristics
- Source
  - location: Unnamed lake near Azalea Park, Florida
  - coordinates: 28°33′51″N 81°16′57″W
  - elevation: 72 feet (22 m)
- Mouth
  - location: Econlockhatchee River near Oviedo, Florida.
  - coordinates: 28°39′15.7″N 81°10′13.7″W
- Length: 18 mi (29 km)

Little Econlockhatchee River (or Little Econ River) is a major tributary of the Econlockhatchee River. It originates at an unnamed lake at 28°33′47″N 81°17′00″W, near Orlando, Florida in southeast Orange County. It is approximately 18 miles (29 km) long, from unincorporated Orange County to its mouth at Oviedo. It is located within the Middle St. Johns River Basin of the St. Johns River Water Management District. It is similar to the Econlockhatchee, with a forest in its floodplain. As far downstream as Blanchard Park, the river acts like a canal. The source elevation is 72 feet (22 m), higher than the source elevation of the tributary of the St. Johns River, the Econlockhatchee River. In August 2008, the river rose a record 4 feet (1.2 m) over its banks due to Tropical Storm Fay.

In November 2008, the river became a place of investigation after divers found a bag of toys, originally thought to be bones, in the river near Blanchard Park in East Orange County. The findings were thought to be related to the disappearance of Orlando toddler Caylee Anthony, who went missing in June 2008.

== See also ==
- Econlockhatchee River
- List of Florida rivers
