= Lake Harney =

Lake in the state of Florida, United States

- Location within Florida Location within the United States
- Location: Volusia and Seminole Counties, Florida
- Coordinates: 28°45′21″N 81°03′36″W
- Type: Flow-through lake
- Primary inflows: St. Johns River, Black Cypress Swamp
- Primary outflows: St. Johns River
- Basin countries: United States
- Managing agency: St. Johns River Water Management District
- Max. length: 4.8 mi (7.7 km)
- Max. width: 2.97 mi (4.78 km)
- Surface area: 9 sq mi (23 km^{2})
- Average depth: 7 ft (2.1 m)
- Max. depth: 15 ft (4.6 m)
- Water volume: 14,465,351,103 US gal (44,400 acre⋅ft; 54.8 hm^{3})
- Shore length^{1}: 12 mi (19 km)
- Surface elevation: 0 ft (0 m)
- Islands: 2 islands and numerous islets, all along the shore
- Settlements: Lake Harney Woods, an unincorporated community
- ^{1} Shore length is not a well-defined measure.

Lake Harney, named for General William S. Harney, is a lake that straddles the county line between Volusia County and Seminole County, Florida, at the coordinates latitude 28°45’21.404", longitude 81° 03’36.019". It is fed by the Saint Johns River which flows through central Florida and feeds many of the nearby lakes such as Lake Monroe.

== History ==
A large amount of Lake Harney's history can be credited to General William S. Harney and the wars he took part in throughout Florida. Mal Martin, in a 2001 online article, "The Naming of Lake Harney", stated, "William Selby Harney was born in Haysboro, Tennessee, on August 22, 1800." He served during the First and Second Seminole Wars as well as the Mexican-American and Civil War. He retired as a general, died on May 9, 1889, in Orlando, Florida, and was buried at Arlington National Cemetery.

During the Second Seminole War, a base called Fort Lane was established on the lake as a supply point for U.S. troops. The fort could only be reached, occasionally, by shallow draft vessels. Anything further south than Lake Harney could only be reached by canoe or similar small poled or rowed craft.

== Wildlife ==
Lake Harney is home to a variety of species of fish, reptiles, water fowl and wading birds. It is nominally fresh water with some salt water springs throughout the area. The lake is home to a variety of fish such as largemouth bass, crappie, bluegill, and redear sunfish, all of which are prey to the lake's birds such as bald eagles, osprey, Crested caracara, white ibis, wood stork (Ibis), herons, cranes, cattle egrets, wild turkeys, a variety of ducks and other water fowl. The Lake Harney Wilderness Area is a protected habitat in which the Florida Fish and Wildlife Conservation Commission, or FWC, observes several bald eagle nests in the area.
