= AdventHealth station =

Commuter rail station in Orlando, Florida

AdventHealth
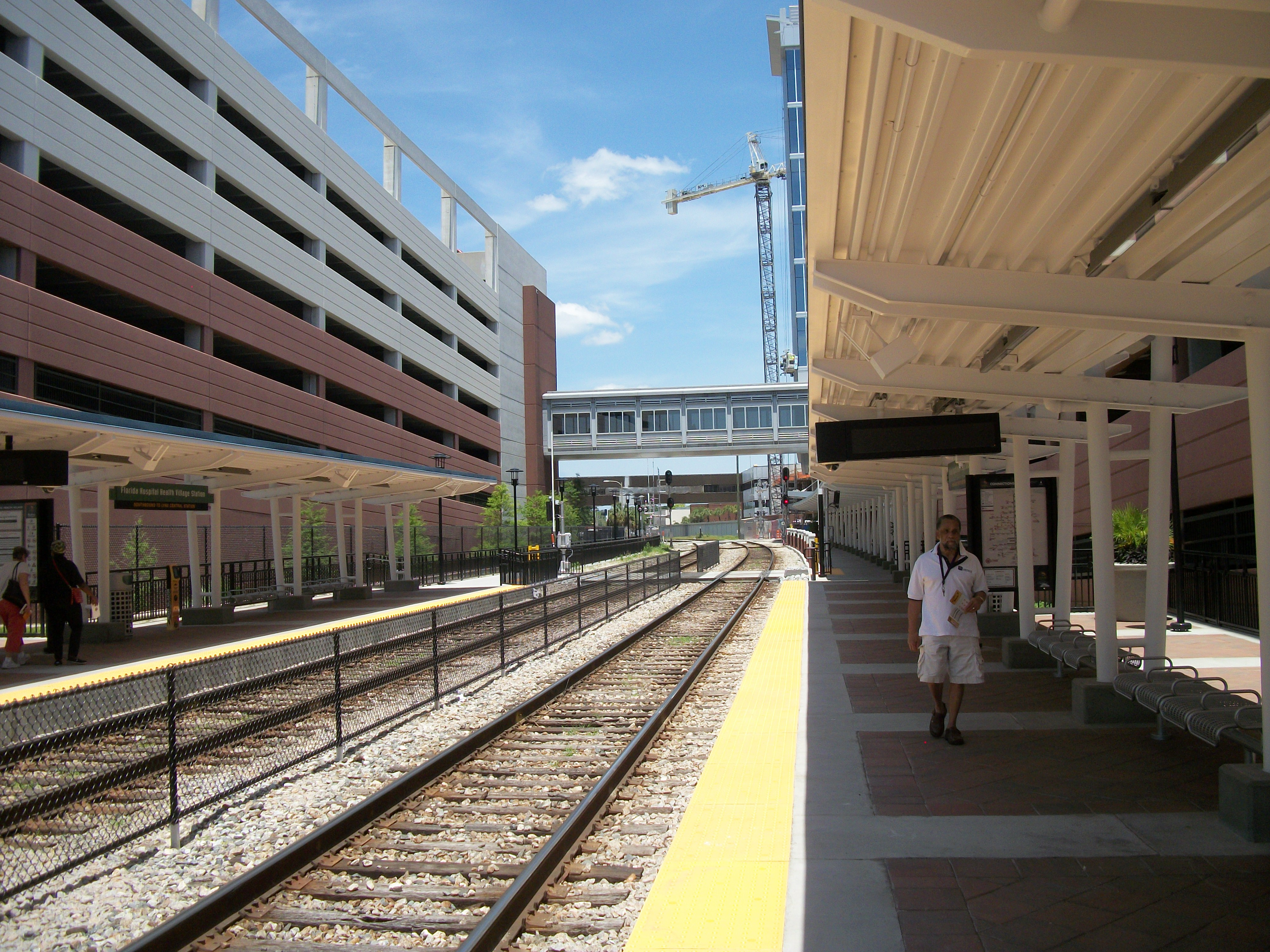
- Looking north from AdventHealth station towards Winter Park, Sanford, DeBary, and eventually DeLand.

General information
- Location: 500 East Rollins Street; Orlando, Florida
- Coordinates: 28.57287°N 81.37148°W
- Owner: Florida Department of Transportation
- Platforms: 2 side platforms
- Tracks: 2
- Connections: LYNX: 102, 125

Construction
- Structure type: At-grade
- Parking: 2 garages (operated by hospital)
- Cycle facilities: Yes
- Accessible: Yes

Other information
- Fare zone: Orange

History
- Opened: May 1, 2014
- Former names: Florida Hospital Health Village

Passengers
- FY2026: 91,986 ▲7.9%

Services
Preceding station	SunRail	Following station
Lynx Central toward Poinciana	SunRail	Winter Park toward DeLand
Location

AdventHealth station (formerly Florida Hospital Health Village station) is a SunRail commuter rail station in Orlando, Florida. The station serves the AdventHealth Orlando hospital complex, the Lake Ivanhoe and College Park neighborhoods, and Loch Haven Park, a municipal park which contains the Orlando Museum of Art, the Orlando Science Center, and the Orlando Shakespeare Theater.

The station is located at the intersection of Princeton Street (SR 438) and North Orange Avenue (SR 527) between two AdventHealth Orlando parking garages. It is the northernmost SunRail stop in the city limits of Orlando.

== History ==
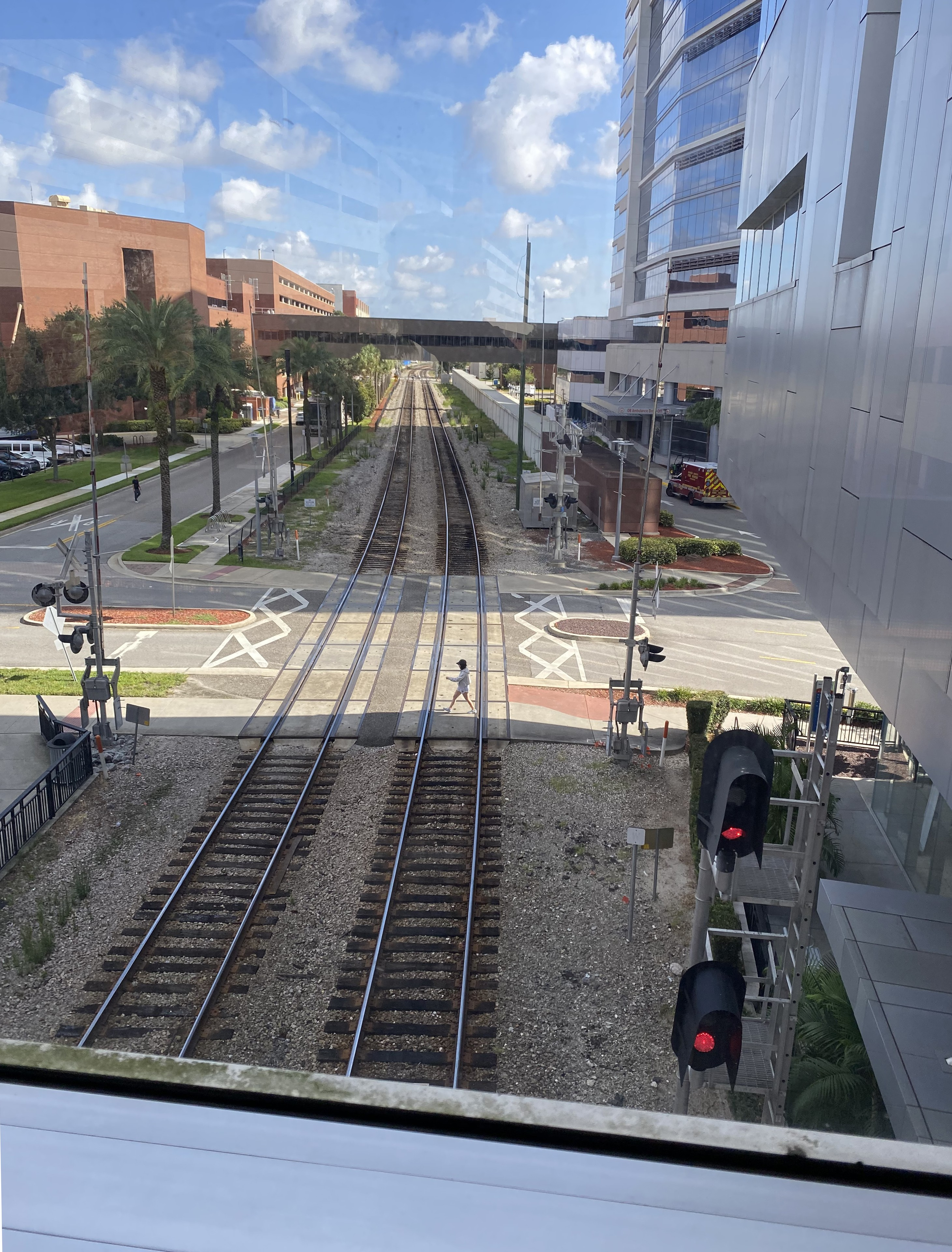
View from the bridge at AdventHealth

SunRail was constructed along the CSX A-Line, a rail corridor which was constructed in 1880 by the South Florida Railroad. Of the four stations in Orlando proper, Florida Hospital Health Village was the only station built from scratch: Church Street and Orlando Health/Amtrak were built at former Atlantic Coast Line Railroad stations, and LYNX Central was built at an existing bus station.

Florida Hospital included the station in plans for Health Village, a mixed-use district that would include apartments, restaurants, and retail in the area surrounding the hospital. Adventist Health System, which owns the hospital, built a regional headquarters building next to the station.

The station was soft opened on April 3, 2014. All four Orlando stations held a grand opening on April 30, and SunRail entered service the following day. In July, Florida Hospital installed additional crossing arms and medians to four streets around the station, which allowed the area to be declared a quiet zone. The city of Orlando also expanded sidewalks and bike trails in Loch Haven Park to improve its connection to the station.

In December 2014, Orlando began soliciting local artists for a $50,000 public art piece, which would be installed at the station and serve as an "entry point" for the nearby Loch Haven Park. The resulting art piece, a 41-by-13-foot (12.5 m × 4.0 m) mural painted by Martha Lent, was installed on December 16, 2016, and is visible from the northbound platform.

In early 2019, the Florida Hospital Health Village complex was renamed to AdventHealth Health Village. The station's name was changed accordingly.
