= The Florida Mall =

Shopping mall in Orlando, Florida, United States

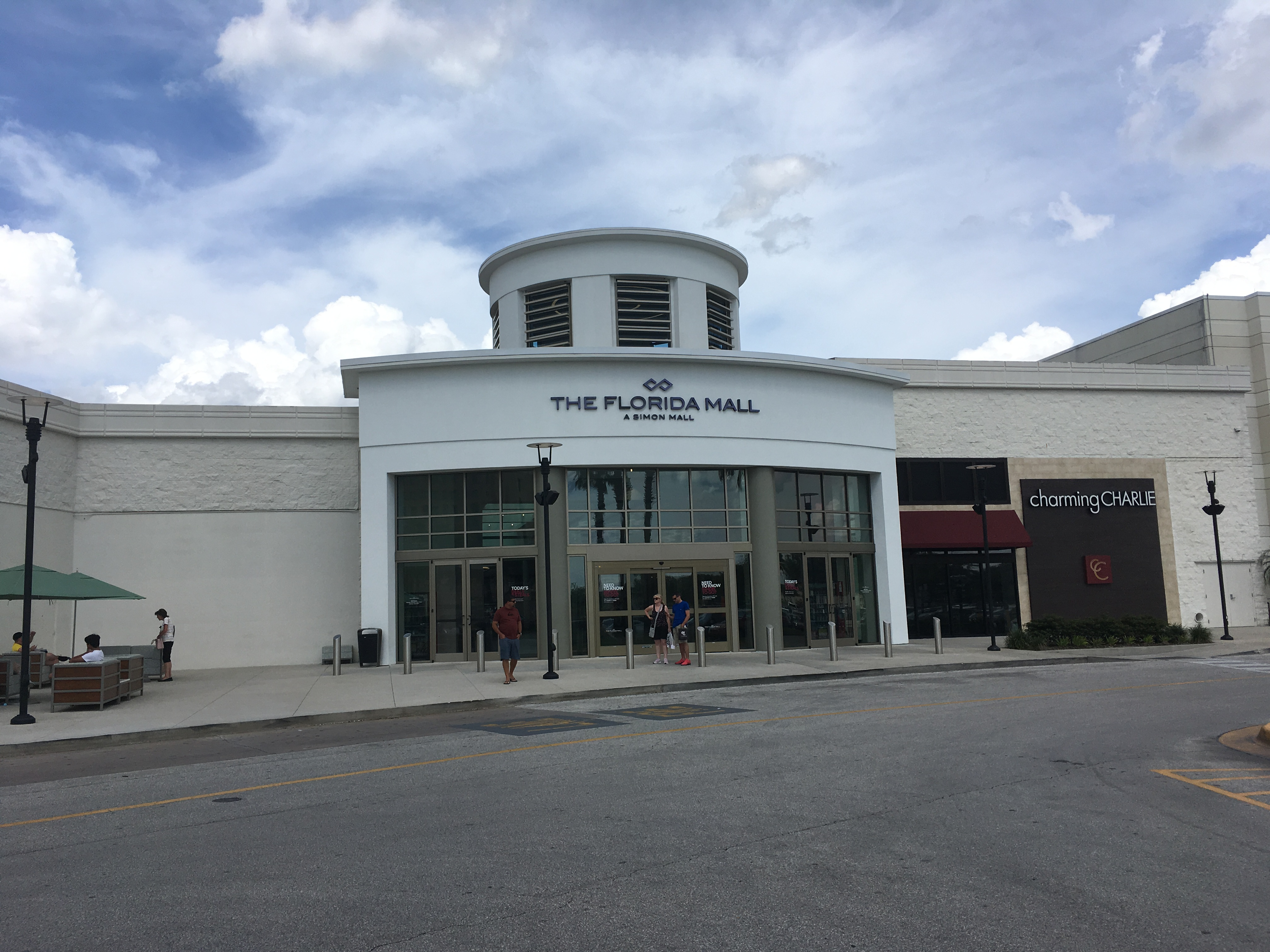
- One of the mall's entrances
- Location: Orange County, Florida, United States
- Coordinates: 28.44592°N 81.39554°W
- Address: 8001 South Orange Blossom Trail; Orlando, FL 32809
- Opened: March 12, 1986; 40 years ago
- Developer: Edward J. DeBartolo Corp.; JCP Realty, Inc.
- Manager: Simon Property Group
- Owner: Simon Property Group (50%)
- Num. of stores: 300
- Num. of anchor tenants: 12 (11 open, 1 vacant)
- Floor area: 1,699,571 sq ft (157,900 m^{2})
- Floors: 1 (2 in Sears, Macy's, JCPenney, Dillard's, Old Navy, H&M, Zara, Crayola Experience, former Forever 21, and Primark, 12 in Florida Hotel)
- Parking: Parking lot, valet parking with 9,220 spaces
- Public transit: 7, 37, 42, 107, 108, 111, 418, 441 at the Florida Mall SuperStop
- Website: www.simon.com/mall/the-florida-mall

The Florida Mall is a super-regional shopping mall located south of Orlando in unincorporated Orange County, Florida, United States, on the southeast corner of Orange Blossom Trail and Sand Lake Road; it opened in 1986. The mall is anchored by Dillard's, Macy's, JCPenney, Sears, Dick's Sporting Goods, and the Crayola Experience. There is one vacant anchor store that was once Forever 21. There is also one anchor store under construction that is set to be Round1 Bowling & Arcade.

The facility was developed by a joint venture of Edward J. DeBartolo Corporation and JCP Realty, Inc., the real estate development arm of JCPenney. As of March 1996, the mall is fully managed by Simon Property Group, which owns 50%. With 1,699,571 sq ft (157,900 m^{2}) of gross leasable area and 294 retailers, it is one of the largest single-story malls in the United States and the largest mall in Central Florida.

== Location ==
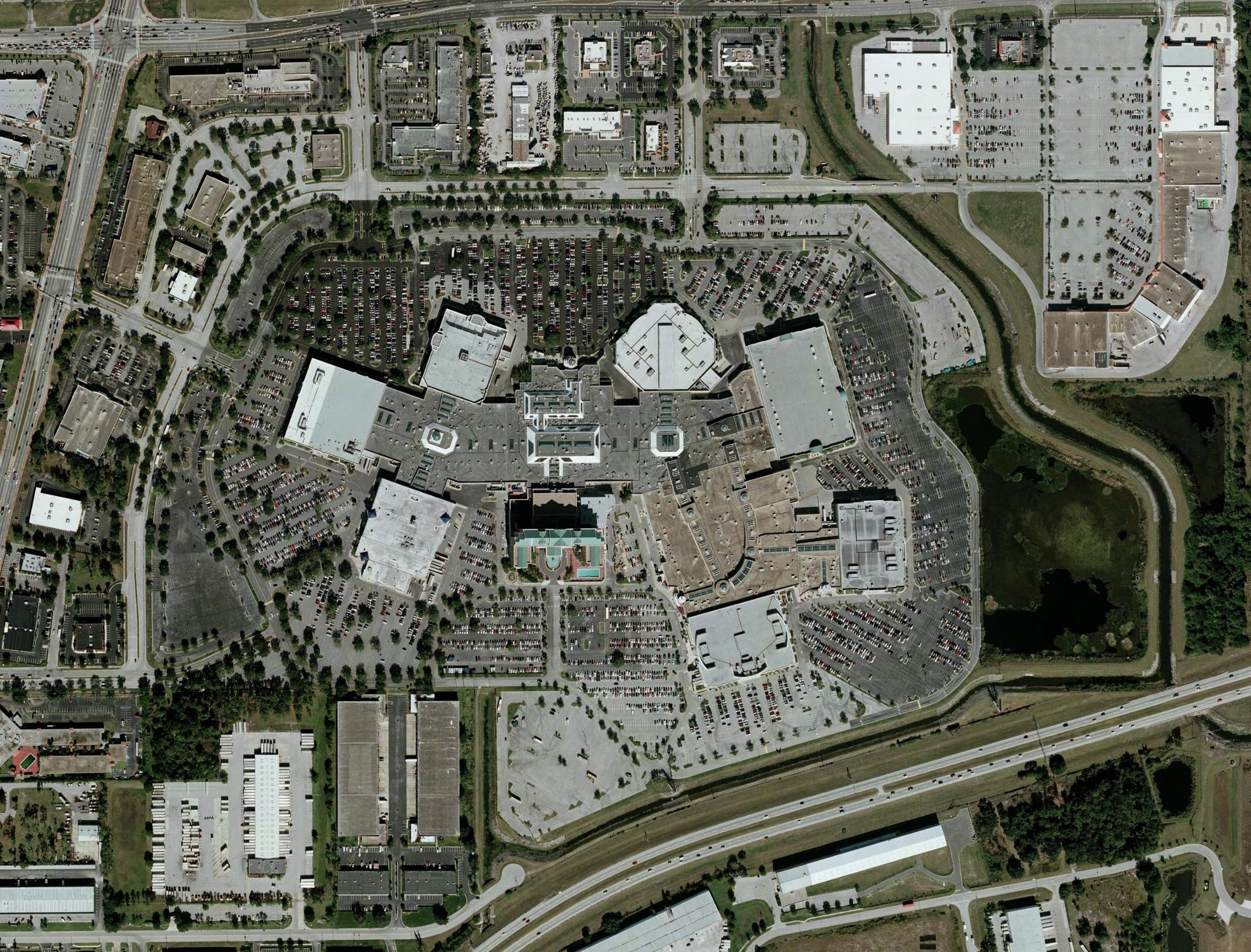
Aerial view of The Florida Mall

The Florida Mall is located in an unincorporated area of Orange County, Florida, south of the city of Orlando. The mall is close to Orlando International Airport and many other Orlando attractions including Universal Orlando Resort, Walt Disney World, SeaWorld Orlando, and International Drive. The Florida Mall is located at the southeast corner of the intersection between US 17/US 92/US 441 (Orange Blossom Trail) and SR 482 (Sand Lake Road) and is situated near the junction of SR 528 (Beachline Expressway) and Florida's Turnpike.

== Description ==
The Florida Mall has a gross leasable area of 1,718,000 square feet (159,600 m^{2}) and contains over 250 stores, making it the largest mall in Central Florida. The mall is one level and is anchored by Dillard's, Macy's, JCPenney, Sears, Dick's Sporting Goods, and the Crayola Experience. Attached to the mall is The Florida Hotel & Conference Center, which contains 511 rooms. The Florida Mall contains numerous smaller stores and entertainment venues including the only American Girl location in the Orlando area. The mall offers various dining options including 25 quick-service restaurants and 8 sit-down restaurants. The Florida Mall features a 105,000-square-foot (9,800 m^{2}) Dining Pavilion that contains 25 restaurants. The mall offers various services to shoppers including valet parking, currency exchange, and package and baggage check. The Florida Mall attracts over 20 million visitors annually, including domestic and international tourists to the Orlando area. As of June 2025, the mall is also home to one of only 8 (soon to be 5) Sears stores remaining in the United States.

== History ==
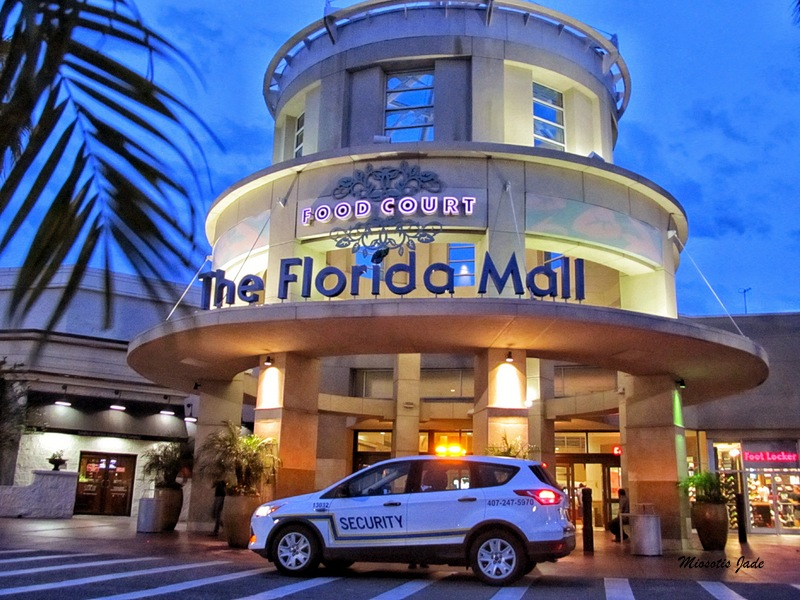
Entrance to the mall's food court in 2015

=== 1983-1990 ===
The construction of The Florida Mall was announced by DeBartolo on February 15, 1983, with a scheduled completion date in Spring 1985. In 1984, Sears, JCPenney, Belk-Lindsey (a regional Florida offshoot of Belk), Robinson's, and Jordan Marsh were selected as the anchor tenants. The Jordan Marsh store faced numerous delays in the late 1980s and was never opened. Following delays, the mall opened on March 12, 1986, with Sears, JCPenney, Belk-Lindsey, and the Crowne Plaza hotel (built by E.J. DeBartolo and owned in partnership with Pratt Hotel Corporation of Dallas, Texas), followed by Robinson's in September of that year. Many of the mall’s design features were borrowed from other DeBartolo malls like Aventura Mall for many expansions and Coral Square for its layout and space frame ceiling. The mall featured three themed sections incorporating Art Deco, Victorian, and Mediterranean styles. A year later, store acquisitions and consolidations started varying the anchor lineup. Robinson's converted to Maison Blanche in August 1987, and the Crowne Plaza rebranded as a Sheraton Plaza in 1988.

=== 1991-2000 ===
Dillard's opened two stores in 1991 at the east end filling the two remaining anchor pads. Maison Blanche was rebranded by Gayfers in early 1992 as a result of Mercantile Stores. In 1996, Belk became Saks Fifth Avenue, while the Sheraton hotel was sold to Adam's Mark. Then, in 1998, Gayfers transitioned into Parisian, whereas Dillard's added a second floor to their newly consolidated store at the east end. In 1998, a $70 million renovation of the mall began, which involved removing many of the indoor themed elements and razing one of the two Dillard's stores to create a new 200,000-square-foot (19,000 m^{2}) wing, anchored by a Burdines store, which opened in 1999.

=== 2000-2014 ===
Lord & Taylor replaced Parisian in 2002, and the east wing was expanded again with Central Florida's first and only Nordstrom. Burdines merged with Macy's in 2003, and in 2004, the hotel was purchased by a group headed by the Bank of Scotland and was renamed The Florida Hotel & Conference Center. Burdines-Macy's simply became Macy's in 2005.

Lord & Taylor closed in 2006. Saks Fifth Avenue closed in 2014. The Saks Fifth Avenue anchor store was reconstructed for a new wing with a new Dining Pavilion. The old food court was reconfigured to include more retail and dining space.

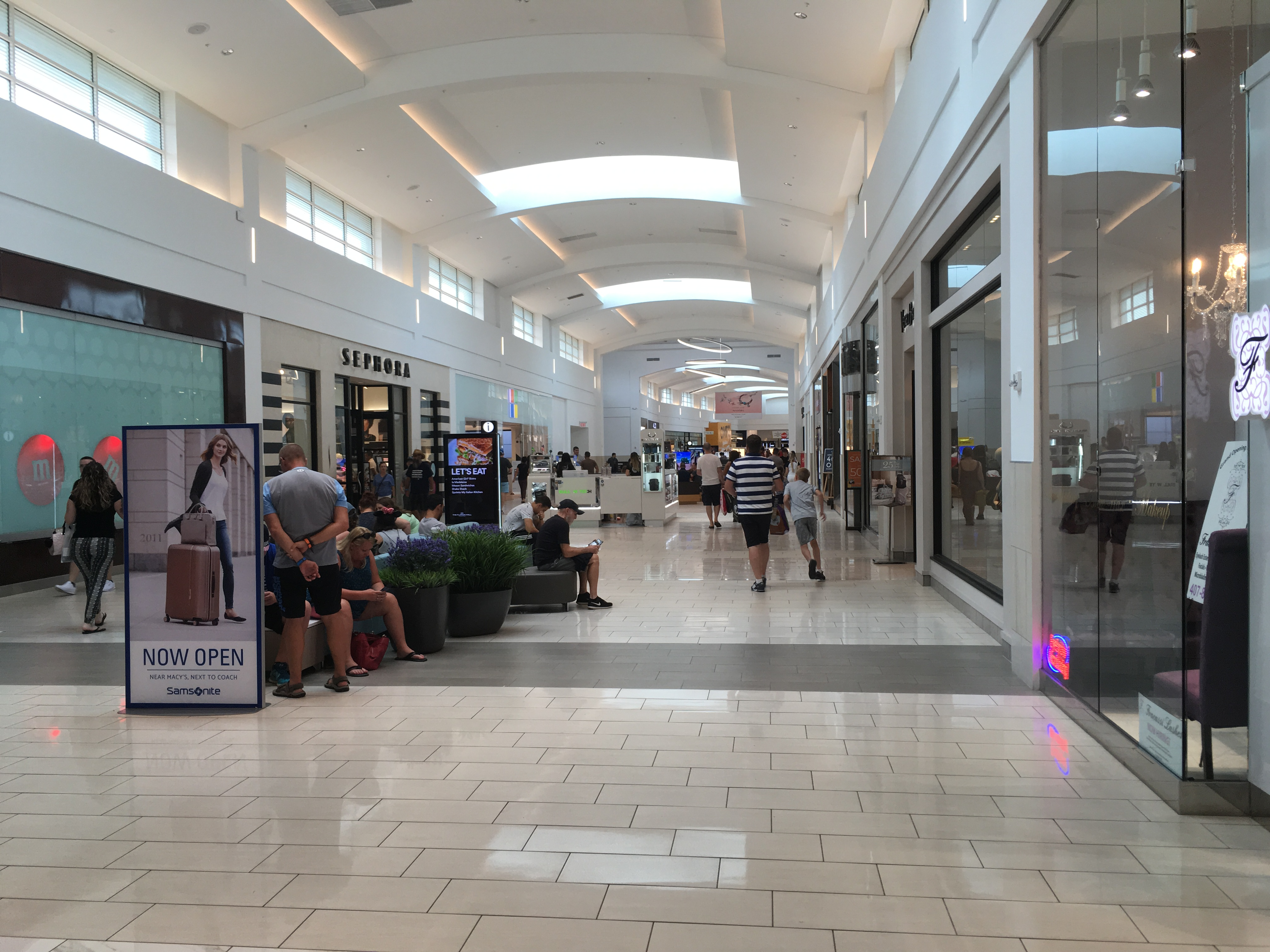
The Florida Mall looking north from Macy's (from 2018)

The Lord & Taylor anchor store was demolished in 2007 and was redeveloped into a new outdoor plaza with stores Forever 21, H&M, and Zara opening in 2009. American Girl was added in fall 2014.

In August 2014, it was announced that the Nordstrom anchor store would close.

=== 2015-present ===
In June 2015, Nordstrom was redesigned for Dick's Sporting Goods and the Crayola Experience.

In early 2019, the mall hosted the Cirque du Soleil touring show Luzia under the big top.

On August 29, 2024, Primark opened in the old Forever 21 location.

In March 2025, it was announced that the entire Forever 21 chain was closing. Their new anchor store closed on May 1, 2025.

In 2025, a portion of the Sears store was leased to Round1. Round1 began construction on one of their arcades in the former Sears space in 2025. The Sears store will continue to operate on a smaller footprint. Round1 is set to open in 2026.

== Transportation ==
Right next to the mall stretches SR 528 (Beachline Expressway) which has an interchange with US 17/US 92/US 441 (Orange Blossom Trail) at exit 4. The exit is only a few exits away from the Orlando International Airport. The mall is also accessible from exit 254 of Florida's Turnpike, which connects to Orange Blossom Trail.

The mall is serviced by Lynx buses (links) 7, 37, 42, 107, 108, 111, 418, and 441 at the Florida Mall SuperStop. The Florida Mall SuperStop has direct bus service from several points in the Orlando area including Lynx Central Station in Downtown Orlando, Kissimmee, Orlando International Airport, SeaWorld Orlando, and Universal Orlando Resort.
