= Winter Park station =

Intercity and commuter rail station in Winter Park, Florida

Winter Park, FL
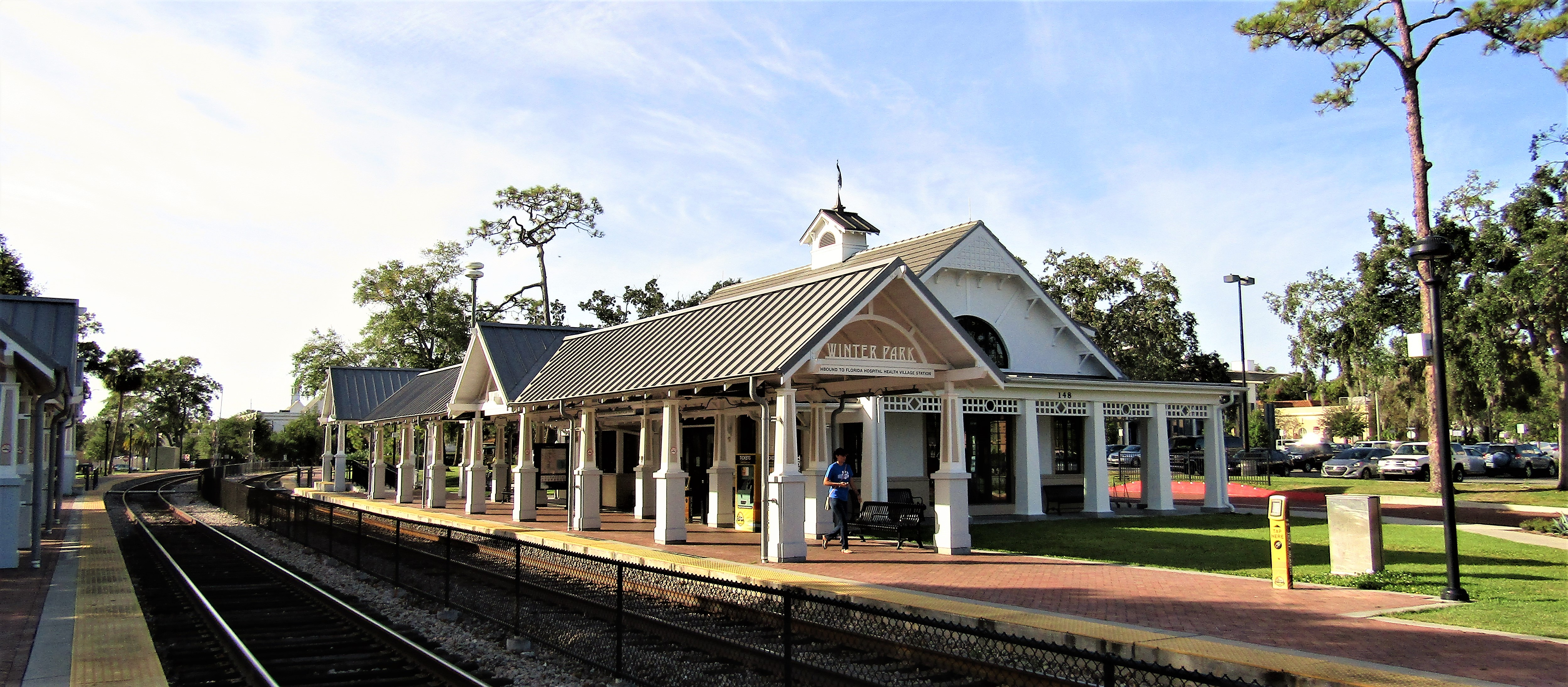
- Winter Park station in October 2016

General information
- Location: 150 West Morse Boulevard; Winter Park, Florida; United States
- Coordinates: 28.59772°N 81.35181°W
- Platforms: 2 side platforms
- Tracks: 2
- Connections: LYNX: 1, 9, 23, 102, 443

Construction
- Parking: Yes
- Accessible: Yes

Other information
- Station code: Amtrak: WPK
- Fare zone: Orange (SunRail)

History
- Opened: 1882
- Rebuilt: 1913, 1962, 2014

Passengers
- FY 2025: 25,452 (Amtrak)
- FY 2026: 129,578 ▲4.2% (SunRail)

Services
Preceding station	Amtrak	Following station
Orlando toward Miami	Floridian	DeLand toward Chicago
Orlando toward Miami	Silver Meteor	DeLand toward New York
Preceding station	SunRail	Following station
AdventHealth toward Poinciana	SunRail	Maitland toward DeLand
Former services
Preceding station	Amtrak	Following station
Orlando toward Orlando or Miami	Sunset Limited 1993-2005	Sanford toward Los Angeles
Orlando toward St. Petersburg	Floridian 1971–1979	Sanford toward Chicago
Orlando toward Miami	Silver Star until 2024	Sanford toward New York
Preceding station	Atlantic Coast Line Railroad	Following station
Orlando toward Tampa	Main Line	Maitland toward Richmond
Location

Winter Park station is a train station in Winter Park, Florida. It is served by SunRail commuter rail service and Amtrak Floridian and Silver Meteor intercity trains. The current station was built in 2014, coinciding with the introduction of SunRail service. Prior stations in the city, dating back to 1882, were constructed by the South Florida Railroad and Atlantic Coast Line Railroad.

As of 2026, the station had 129,578 SunRail riders in the most recent fiscal year. It is the second-busiest SunRail station, behind only Lynx Central Station in downtown Orlando.

== History ==
=== Previous stations ===
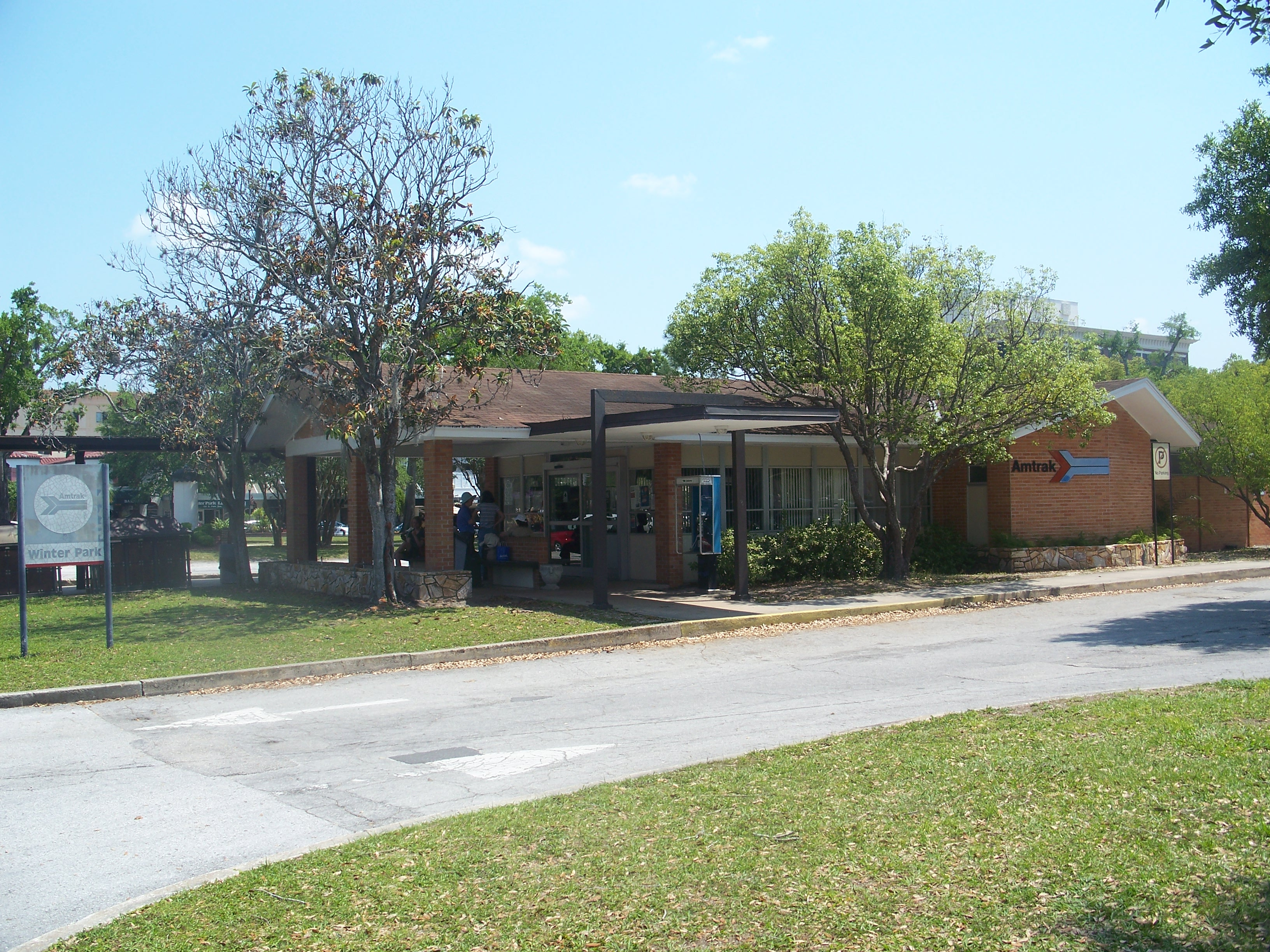
The 1962-built station building

Rail lines passing through modern-day Winter Park were first built by the South Florida Railroad (SFR), which ran between Orlando and Sanford, in 1880. The city was planned around the railroad tracks, and a small depot was built in 1882.

A combined passenger station and freight depot was built in 1913 by the Atlantic Coast Line Railroad (ACL), which had acquired the SFR in 1902.

A newer station was built by the ACL in 1962. The station was directly adjacent to Central Park, a municipal green space, and was also one block away from Park Avenue, a street lined with upscale boutiques and restaurants. Passenger service was moved to this station, but the older station remained in active use for freight until 1982, when it was purchased by the city. It is now used as a venue for a weekly farmer's market, weddings, and other special events.

=== Current station ===
In 2008, the city of Winter Park began to solicit public input on a larger replacement for the 1962 station. Construction on the new station began on February 14, 2013. The station was built at a cost of $1.2 million, $950,000 of which was provided by a Bus and Bus Facilities grant from the Federal Transit Administration. It is LEED Silver certified.

The architecture of the Winter Park station and platform canopies are notably distinct from other SunRail stations, being built with white gabled roofs in the Craftsman architectural style. This design was chosen to reflect the early-20th century architecture of Winter Park's historic downtown. The building is topped with a weather vane depicting a peacock, which is the city's official symbol. Following the opening of the new station on March 3, 2014, the 1962-built ACL depot was closed and demolished.

On November 10, 2024, the Silver Star was merged with the Capitol Limited as the Floridian.
