= Orlando Fashion Square =

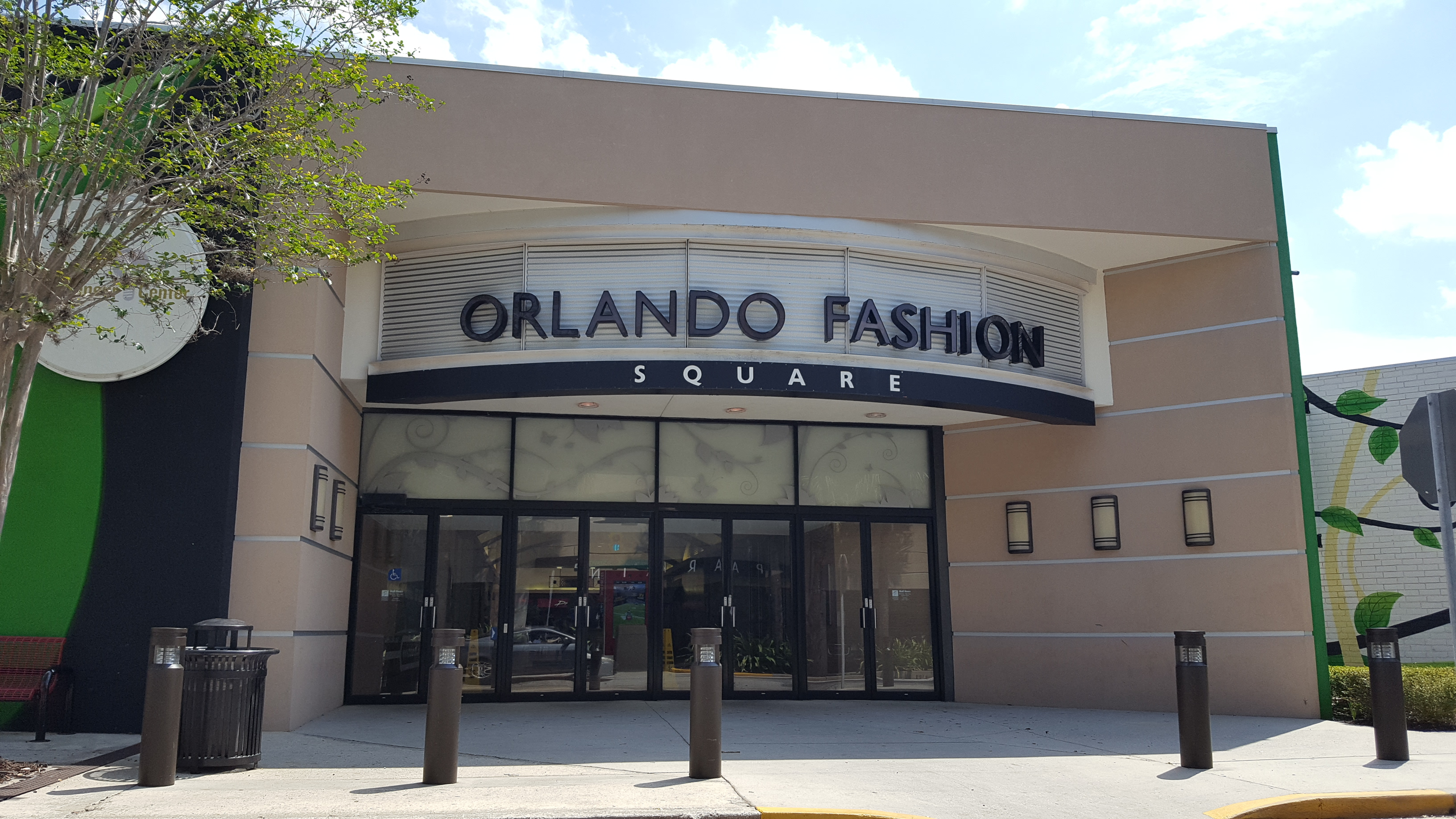
- Entrance to Orlando Fashion Square, April 2017
- Location: Orlando, Florida, United States
- Coordinates: 28.553523°N 81.34093°W
- Opened: July 30, 1973; 53 years ago
- Developer: Leonard L. Farber
- Owner: UP Development, Inc.
- Num. of stores: 28
- Num. of anchor tenants: 4 (1 open, 3 vacant)
- Floor area: 1,085,651 square feet (101,000 m^{2})
- Floors: 2 (2 in Dillard's, Macy's, and former JCPenney, 2nd floor closed off in Dillard's)
- Public transit: 13, 28, 29, 104
- Website: orlandofashionsquare.com

Orlando Fashion Square is a two-story indoor shopping mall located in Orlando, Florida. Opened in 1973, it features 28 stores in over one million square feet of shop space. The mall's anchor stores are Macy's, Floor & Decor, and Dillard's Clearance Center. Predating the mall's opening was a Sears department store opened in 1963; this store closed in 2016 and has been razed for redevelopment. JCPenney, another anchor store, closed in 2020. Other major tenants include Planet Fitness. The mall is managed by UP Development, Inc.

== History ==
The first operational store on the site was a 173,000-square-foot (16,100 m^{2}) Sears department store, which opened for business on October 30, 1963. The mall was first announced in 1971 by developer Leonard L. Farber, who also developed Pompano Square (now Pompano Citi Centre) in Pompano Beach, Florida. Under the original plans, the mall would be attached to the existing Sears store, with Burdines as the second anchor. Burdines opened along with the rest of the mall on July 30, 1973.

A third anchor, Robinson's of Florida, opened on the north side of the mall on October 29, 1973. Robinson's of Florida was the newly created Florida division of California-based J.W. Robinsons. The Orlando location was their second Florida location, opening two months after their first store at Tyrone Square Mall in St. Petersburg.

A freestanding movie theater was built on an outparcel in 1975 which existed until 1989. In 1988, Robinson's Florida stores were sold to Maison Blanche. Maison Blanche then built a new store just northeast of the original store two years later. The previous store would become more inline mall space connecting the new store with the rest of the mall. Maison Blanche became Gayfer's in 1992, which was then sold to Dillard's in 1998. JCPenney built a new store at the mall to replace a store at Winter Park Mall in 1993. An interior renovation completed in 2002. In 2004, a new movie theater owned by Premiere Cinemas opened in the mall. Burdines became Macy's in 2005.

In 2013, PREIT sold the mall to UP Development, Inc. for $35 million. The new owner has plans to redevelop the mall. One year later a new bowling alley was added and the movie theater was rebuilt.

In 2014, Dillard's converted its store to a Dillard's Clearance Center, and closed its second floor. The mall lost several other stores such as Bath & Body Works, Victoria's Secret, and The Limited.

In 2015, Sears Holdings spun off 235 of its properties, including the Sears at Orlando Fashion Square, into Seritage Growth Properties.

On August 9, 2016, Sears announced their intentions to close their store at this mall. The Sears store was demolished in April 2017. Floor & Decor and Orchard Supply Hardware were built to replace Sears. Outparcels on the Seritage site include Longhorn Steakhouse, and Olive Garden.

On June 4, 2020, JCPenney announced that it would be closing as part of a plan to close 154 stores nationwide. The store closed on October 18, 2020.

Stores that have closed at the mall in 2022-2023 include Claire's, Finish Line, Journeys, and T-Mobile, Hot Topic and Spencer Gifts.

In March of 2026, Premiere Cinemas 14 announced they would be closing permanently on March 12, 2026 after 22 years at the mall.

== Notable incidents ==
=== 2026 car accident ===
On January 16, 2026, a car crashed into the Dillard's store at the mall. The driver had minor injuries, and refused medical transport. As of February 2026, the cause for the crash has still not been determined yet.
