= Sanford station (Amtrak) =

Amtrak rail station in Sanford, Florida

Sanford, FL
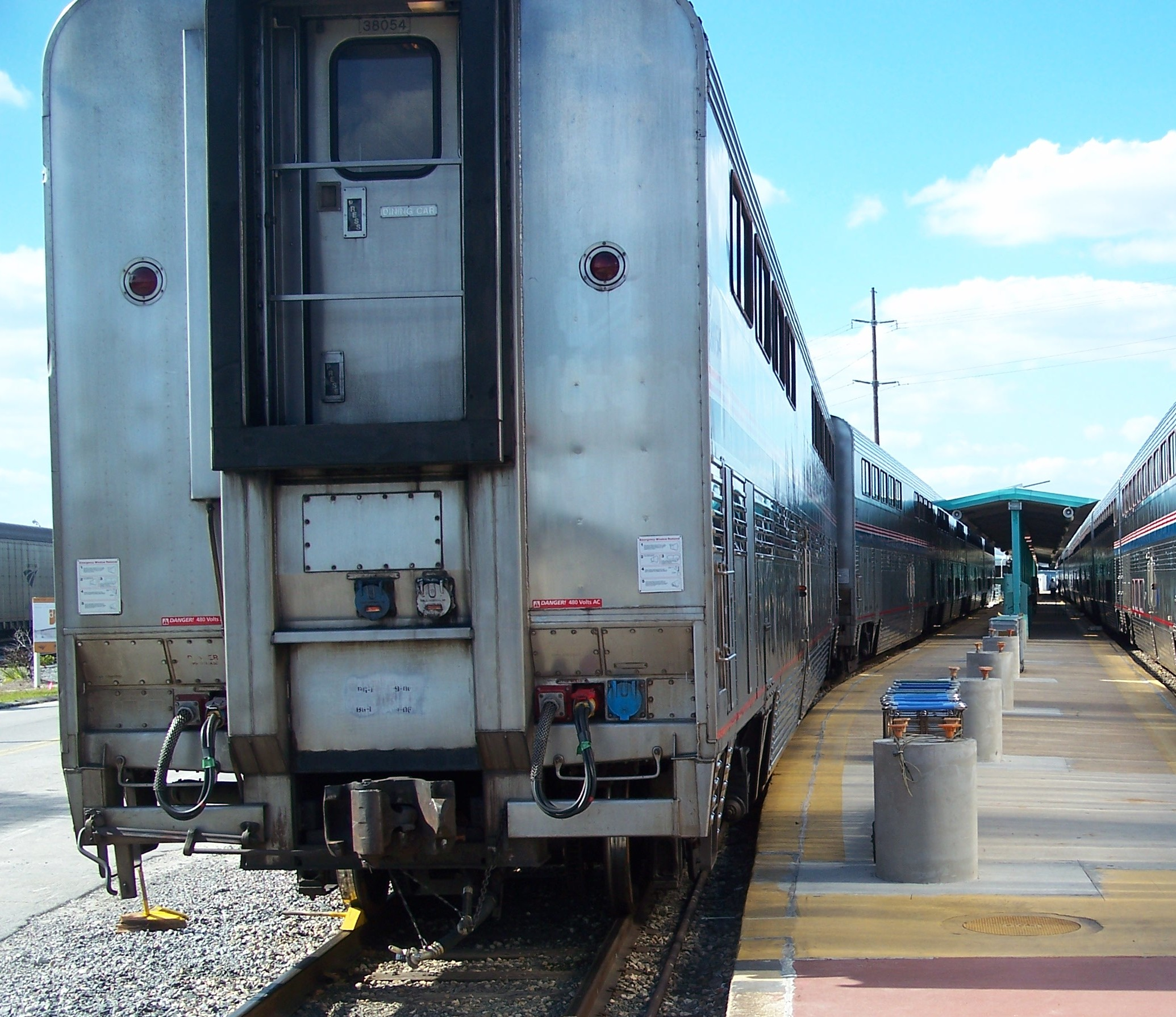
- Auto Train passenger cars at Sanford station in October 2010

General information
- Location: 600 South Persimmon Avenue; Sanford, Florida; United States
- Coordinates: 28.80709°N 81.28885°W
- Owner: Amtrak
- Platforms: 1 island platform
- Connections: Sanford trolley Scout

Construction
- Accessible: Yes

Other information
- Station code: Amtrak: SFA
- Fare zone: Scout: Monroe

History
- Opened: 1971
- Closed: 1981–1983
- Rebuilt: 2009–2010

Passengers
- FY 2025: 265,950 (Amtrak)

Services
Preceding station	Amtrak	Following station
Terminus	Auto Train	Florence (Service stop only) toward Lorton
Former services
Preceding station	auto-train	Following station
Terminus	Sanford–Lorton	Lorton Terminus
Terminus	Sanford–Louisville 1974–1977	Louisville Terminus
Former services at ACL station
Preceding station	Amtrak	Following station
Winter Park 1997–2005 toward Orlando	Sunset Limited 1993–2005	DeLand toward New Orleans
Terminus	Sunset Limited 1993–2005	DeLand toward New Orleans
Winter Park 1993–1996 toward Miami	Sunset Limited 1993–2005	DeLand toward New Orleans
Winter Park toward Miami	Silver Meteor Until 2005	DeLand toward New York
Winter Park toward Miami	Silver Star Until 2005	DeLand toward New York
Winter Park toward Miami	Palmetto 2002–2004	DeLand toward New York
Winter Park toward Miami	Silver Palm 1996–2002	DeLand toward New York
Winter Park toward St. Petersburg	Floridian 1971–1979	DeLand toward Chicago
Preceding station	Atlantic Coast Line Railroad	Following station
Lake Mary toward Tampa	Main Line	Benson Junction toward Richmond
New Upsala toward Fort Mason	Fort Mason – Sanford	Terminus
Cedar Avenue toward St. Petersburg	Orange Belt Railway	Terminus
Location

Sanford station is a railroad terminal in Sanford, Florida. It is the southern terminus for Amtrak's Auto Train, which runs between this station and Lorton, Virginia. It is Amtrak's busiest station in Florida, as of fiscal 2022, when it served 269,381 passengers.

As of 2022, the Auto Train loads its passengers on two tracks in Sanford, as no single track is long enough for all of the passenger railcars. A railroad crossing runs through the middle of Sanford's rail yard, an unusual situation for a modern station and yard.

== History ==
The station was opened in 1971 by the Auto-Train Corporation, a railroad that operated its rolling stock along tracks owned by other railroads. The station and the service closed when the railroad fell into bankruptcy in 1981.

The station was reopened in 1983 when Amtrak revived the Auto Train service. In 2004, hurricanes damaged the station building. The facility was also older and smaller than the terminal at Lorton.

On May 18, 2009, Amtrak broke ground on a new $10.5 million station designed by d+A design + Architecture of Yardley, Pennsylvania. The new building, which opened on October 18, 2010, has a waiting room for 600 travelers, a ticket counter, a café, restrooms, and a gift shop. The building incorporates energy-saving features such as energy-efficient HVAC, lighting, and glass coatings that minimize solar gain. A portion of the old station abutting the new structure was reconfigured into administrative offices.

== Other train stations in Sanford ==
A second Amtrak station was located three-tenths of a mile (0.48 km) south of the Auto Train terminal, which served the Silver Star, Silver Meteor, and Sunset Limited. The station was built by the Atlantic Coast Line Railroad in 1913 and rebuilt in 1953. Like most U.S. passenger stations, it was acquired by Amtrak upon its inception in 1971. Though Amtrak gave the address as 800 Persimmon Avenue, the station was actually located at the end of West 8th Street, about 760 feet (230 m) west of Persimmon Avenue. Amtrak closed the station on August 1, 2005, and demolished it in 2009.

SunRail, the Central Florida commuter rail system, revived local passenger rail service to Sanford when it began operations in 2014. It built a new station on State Road 46 rather than on the site of the former Amtrak station.
