= Lynx (Orlando) =

Public transportation service in Orlando, Florida

LYNX

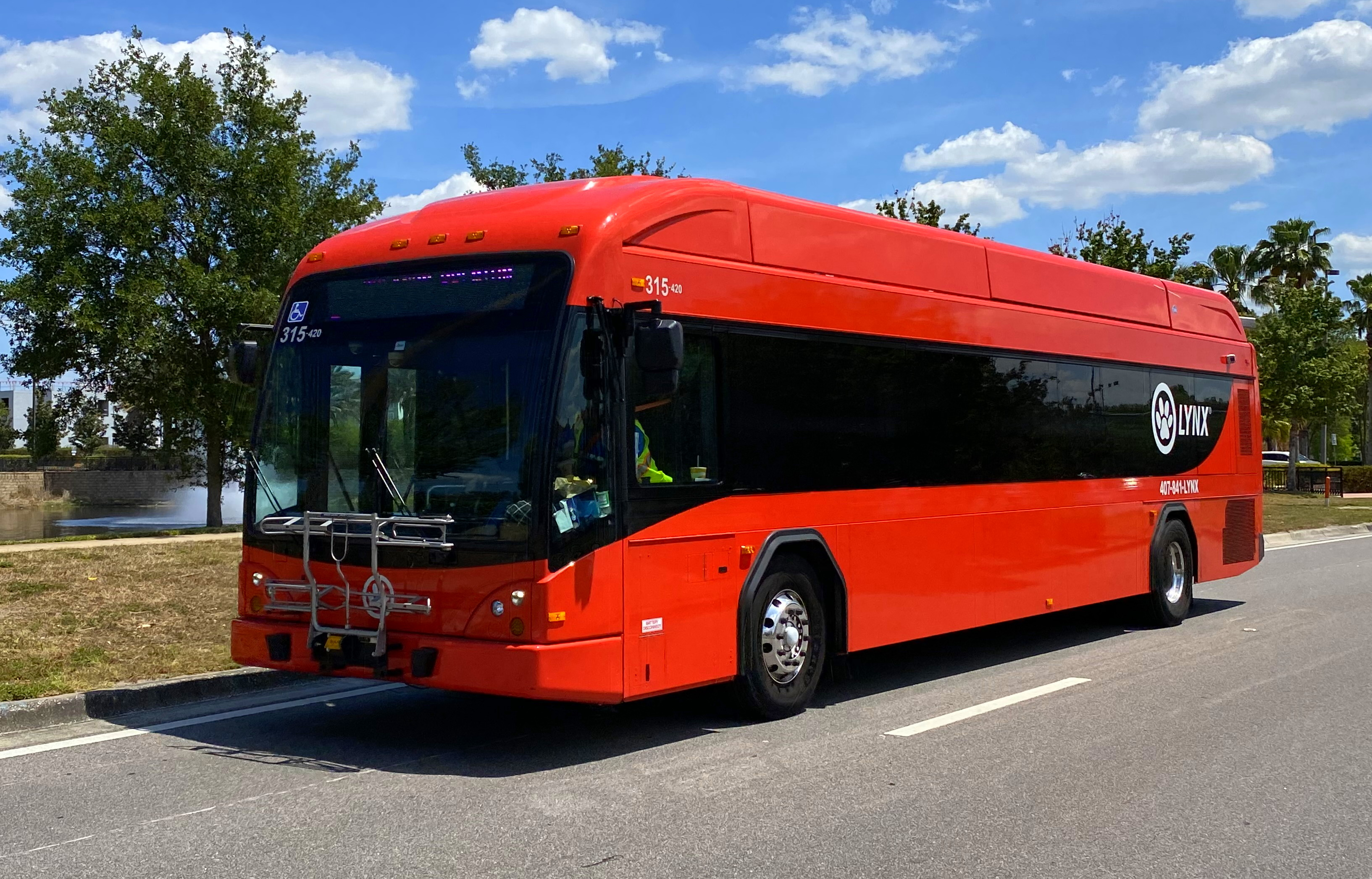
- A LYNX Gillig Low Floor bus
- Founded: May 1972
- Headquarters: 455 N Garland Avenue; Orlando, Florida
- Locale: Greater Orlando, U.S.
- Service area: Orange County, Seminole County, Osceola County, Lake County, Polk County
- Service type: Transit bus
- Routes: 62 fixed 9 flexible-service
- Stops: 4,261
- Fleet: 290
- Daily ridership: 63,200 (weekdays, Q2 2026)
- Annual ridership: 22,159,500 (2025)
- Fuel type: Biodiesel, diesel, CNG, Electric
- Operator: Central Florida Regional Transportation Authority
- Chief executive: Tiffany Homler Hawkins
- Website: golynx.com

Lynx (stylized as LYNX) is a transit system serving the greater Orlando, Florida area. Operated by the Central Florida Regional Transportation Authority, it provides fixed-route bus, curb-to-curb, and paratransit services in three counties: Orange, Seminole, and Osceola. LYNX does not operate SunRail, the region's commuter rail service, but it does provide bus connections to SunRail stations within its service area.

In 2025, the system had a ridership of 22,159,500, or about 63,200 per weekday as of the second quarter of 2026.

== History ==
Bus service in Orlando was originally provided by the Orlando Transit Company, a private operator. When the company halted service in 1972 due to financial troubles, three local counties organized the Orange-Seminole-Osceola Transportation Authority (OSOTA) to operate bus services in its place. The agency's bus service was originally named Tri-County Transit (TCT).

Despite the name, Tri-County Transit only operated in Orange County and Seminole County; bus routes for Osceola County were planned but not funded. Service to Osceola County was not introduced until January 1993 with an eight-month trial route.

In 1992, OSOTA held a public contest to choose a new name for Tri-County Transit. The winning name, LYNX, was chosen from 12,000 entries. The following year, OSOTA was merged with the Central Florida Commuter Rail Authority (which was organized to construct a commuter rail system along Interstate 4) and was renamed to the Central Florida Regional Transportation Authority.

In November 2004, LYNX opened LYNX Central Station, the bus system's primary transit hub. The station became an intermodal station in 2014 with the opening of SunRail.

== Services ==
=== LYNX Bus ===
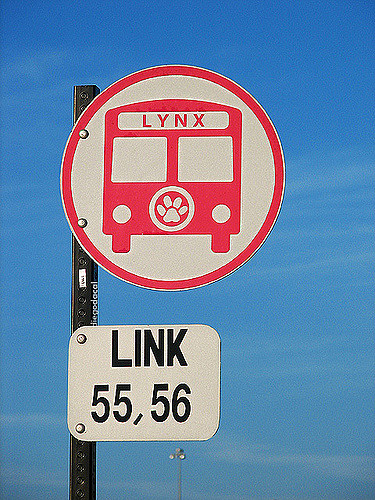
Current LYNX bus stop signage

LYNX operates bus routes throughout its three-county service area. The bus system connects to LakeXpress (servicing Lake County) in Four Corners, Winter Garden, and Zellwood, and it also connects to Citrus Connection (servicing Polk County) in Four Corners and Poinciana. All SunRail stations within the service area have bus connections, though transfers are irregularly timed.

LYNX directly services Disney Springs and the Transportation and Ticket Center of Walt Disney World, as well as some employee areas. All other transportation in WDW is provided by Disney's own bus system. A similar system is used at Universal Orlando; LYNX connects to Universal CityWalk (and, by extension, the original two parks), while Universal's resorts are connected via trails, water taxis, and a resort-operated bus.

Bus frequency varies by route, ranging from every fifteen minutes to every hour. On official maps, routes with frequencies of thirty minutes or better are colored purple, while less-frequent routes are colored orange. All routes are available Monday through Friday; weekend and holiday service varies by route.

Three routes (407, 418, and 441), branded as FastLink, use a limited-stop route pattern to provide faster trips.

All LYNX buses, with the exception of those used on the LYMMO system, have front-mounted bike racks which can be used at no extra charge.

Bus stop signs were originally designated with a lynx paw in place of a traditional bus icon, with Links servicing the stop listed below. Following a rebranding initiative, this was replaced with a bus icon that incorporates the lynx paw.

==== LYMMO (Bus Rapid Transit) ====
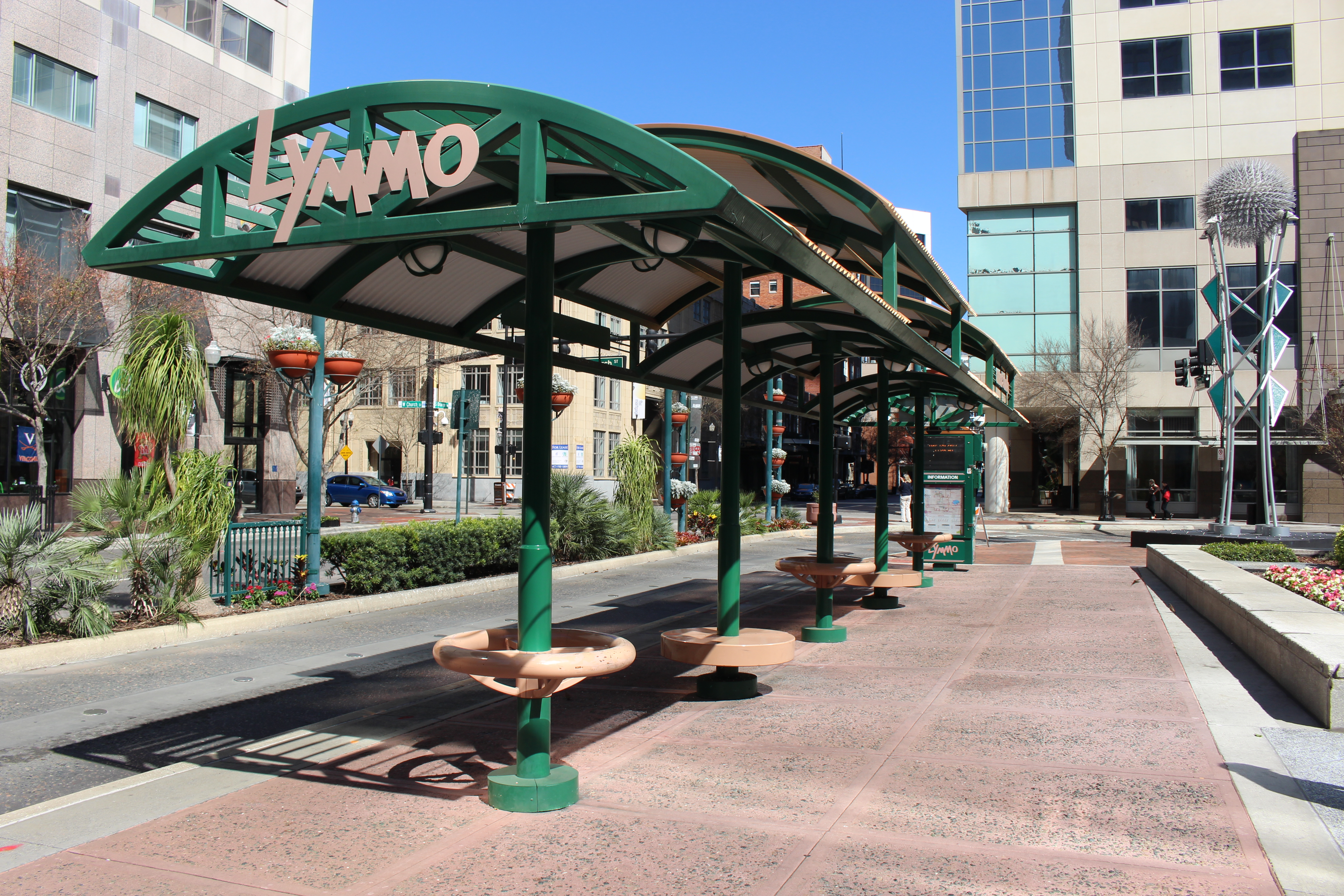
LYMMO stop on South Orange Avenue in Downtown Orlando

LYMMO is a free bus rapid transit system in Downtown Orlando, which utilizes bus lanes and priority signals to improve speed and reliability. The service connects downtown destinations, such as Lake Eola Park and Kia Center, to parking and LYNX Central Station. The service was first launched in 1997 and claims to be the oldest BRT system in the United States.

The system consists of three circulator routes, each named after citrus fruits: the Orange Line (officially Link 60), the Lime Line (Link 61), and the Grapefruit Line (Link 62). Orange and Grapefruit operate daily with frequencies of 12 minutes at peak and 15-20 minutes off-peak. Lime operates weekdays only at 20 minute frequencies.

=== NeighborLink ===
NeighborLink (formerly PickUpLine) is an on-demand service that allows riders to schedule curb-to-curb trips within 11 specified zones. Trips can be scheduled online, by phone, or through an app.

=== Access LYNX ===
Access LYNX is a paratransit service which provides ADA-compliant service to patrons incapable of using the bus system, as well as non-ADA service to users without reliable transportation due to disability, age, or income. Since June 2023, Access LYNX has been operated by Transdev.

=== Vanpool ===
LYNX operates a vanpool program for riders in its service area, which allows groups of six to fifteen people to rent a vehicle for a monthly fee. The cost covers registration and service, but it does not cover fuel or tolls.

=== Road Rangers ===
In partnership with the Florida Department of Transportation, LYNX operates Road Rangers, a roadside assistance program for drivers on Interstate 4. Road Rangers provides minor vehicle repairs, towing, and communication with first responders to drivers.

Road Rangers services two stretches of I-4, totaling 48 miles. The eastern stretch lasts from Exit 132 (Interstate 95) to Exit 98 (Lake Mary Boulevard). The western stretch lasts from Exit 72 (Florida State Road 528) to Exit 58 (Osceola County Road 532).

== Routes ==
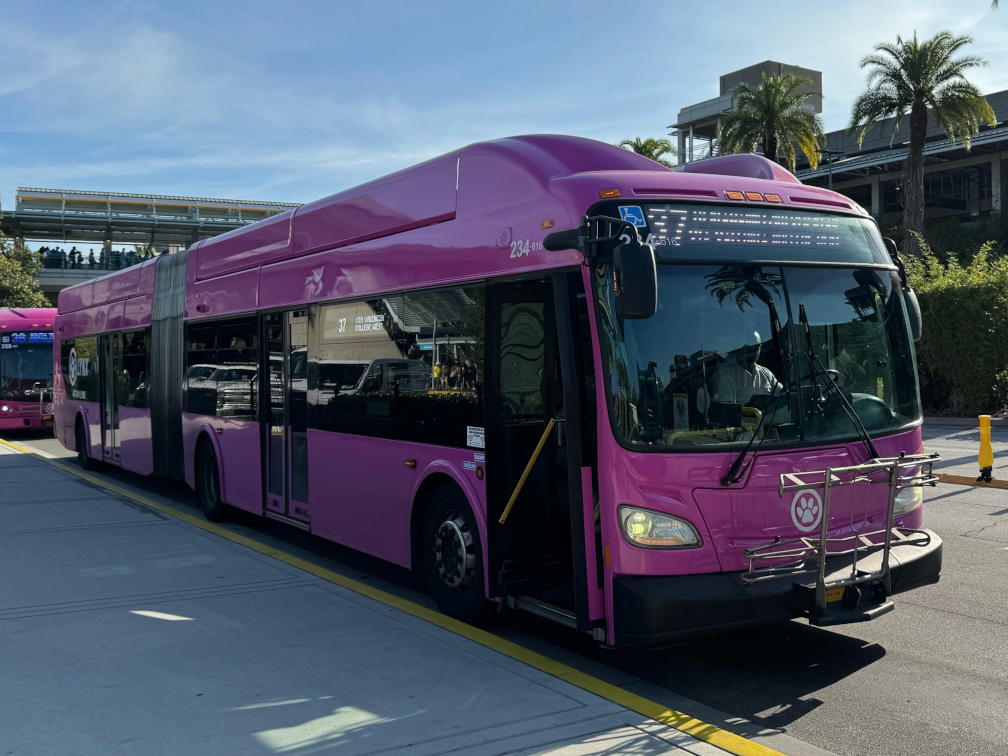
A Lynx New Flyer Xcelsior at Universal Orlando

As of January 2026, LYNX operates 62 bus routes.

Legend
Designation	Description
Frequent	30-minute headways or better during daytime
Infrequent	60-minute headways
Select	2-4 trips per day
FastLink	60-minute headways with fewer stops
LYMMO	Downtown circulators

Route	Name	Terminals			Major streets traveled	Ridership (FY 2025)	Service notes
1	Winter Park/Maitland Center	Maitland Maitland Center Parkway	Weekdays ↔	Winter Park Winter Park station	Lake Destiny Drive, Lake Avenue, Orlando Avenue, Denning Drive	72,059	No Sunday service
1	Winter Park/Maitland Center	Maitland Maitland Center Parkway	Saturdays ↔	Winter Park Village Webster Avenue and Denning Drive	Lake Destiny Drive, Lake Avenue, Orlando Avenue, Denning Drive	72,059	No Sunday service
3	Lake Margaret Drive	Downtown Orlando Lynx Central Station	↔	Conway Dixie Belle Drive and Gatlin Avenue	Rosalind Avenue, Delaney Avenue, Michigan Street, Lake Margaret Drive	195,393	
6	Dixie Belle Drive/Bumby Avenue	Winter Park AdventHealth Winter Park	↔	Conway Dixie Belle Drive and Gatlin Avenue	Bumby Avenue, Dixie Belle Drive	32,851	No weekend service
7	South Orange Avenue/Florida Mall	Downtown Orlando Lynx Central Station	↔	Florida Mall Florida Mall SuperStop	Orange Avenue, Oak Ridge Road	223,784	
8	West Oak Ridge Road/International Drive	Downtown Orlando Lynx Central Station	↔	Orange County Orlando Vineland Premium Outlets	Orange Blossom Trail, Oak Ridge Road, International Drive, Westwood Boulevard (select trips)	1,782,543	Some trips run via Westwood Boulevard south of Central Florida Parkway
9	Winter Park/Rosemont/Pine Hills	Pine Hills Pine Hills Transfer Center	Weekdays ↔	Winter Park Winter Park station	Pine Hills Road, Cinderlane Parkway, Kennedy Boulevard, Orlando Avenue	134,320	Sunday trips extend to Calvary Towers before returning to Winter Park Village
9	Winter Park/Rosemont/Pine Hills	Pine Hills Pine Hills Transfer Center	Weekends ↔	Winter Park Village Webster Avenue and Denning Drive	Pine Hills Road, Cinderlane Parkway, Kennedy Boulevard, Orlando Avenue	134,320	Sunday trips extend to Calvary Towers before returning to Winter Park Village
10	East US-192/St. Cloud	Kissimmee Kissimmee station	↔	St. Cloud Narcoossee Road and US-192	Main Street, US-192	253,685	
11	South Orange Avenue/Orlando International Airport	Downtown Orlando Lynx Central Station	↔	Orlando International Airport Terminal A	Orange Avenue	371,079	Stops at Sand Lake Road station; Weekday rush hour and all weekend trips serve Sand Lake Road station
13	University Boulevard/Winter Park	Downtown Orlando Lynx Central Station	↔	University of Central Florida UCF SuperStop	Rosalind Avenue, Anderson Street/South Street, Bumby Avenue, Lakemont Avenue, University Boulevard	202,329	
15	Curry Ford Road	Downtown Orlando Lynx Central Station	↔	Valencia College Valencia College East	Rosalind Avenue, Curry Ford Road, Chickasaw Trail	440,218	
18	South Orange Avenue/Kissimmee	Downtown Orlando Lynx Central Station	↔	Kissimmee Kissimmee station	Main Street, Landstar Boulevard, Orange Avenue	242,825	Stops at Sand Lake Road station and Meadow Woods station; Northbound Saturday evening trips short-turn at Sand Lake Road station; No Sunday service
19	Richmond Heights	Downtown Orlando Lynx Central Station	↔	Washington Shores Washington Shores SuperStop	Paramore Avenue, Orange Center Boulevard	271,936	Southbound trips serve Washington Shores, the run in a loop at Roosevelt Park/Richmond Heights, before returning to Washington Shores; Some Sunday morning trips run the Roosevelt Park/Richmond Heights loop only
20	Malibu Street/Pine Hills/Washington Shores	Downtown Orlando Lynx Central Station	↔	Princeton/Silver Star Princeton Street/John Young Parkway Walmart	Church Street, Ivey Lane, Mercy Drive, Princeton Street	165,190	Last inbound Saturday trip short-turns at Washington Shores SuperStop
21	Raleigh Street/Kirkman Road/Universal Orlando	Downtown Orlando Lynx Central Station	↔	Orange County Sand Lake Commons Boulevard	Central Boulevard, Raleigh Street, Kirkman Road	721,464	Friday and Saturday trips after 8:15 pm do not serve Universal Orlando
23	Winter Park/Rosemont/Altamonte Springs	Altamonte Springs West Town Parkway and Bunnell Road	Weekdays ↔	Winter Park Winter Park station	Forest City Road, All American Boulevard, Edgewater Drive, Denning Drive	87,278	No Sunday service
23	Winter Park/Rosemont/Altamonte Springs	Altamonte Springs West Town Parkway and Bunnell Road	Saturdays ↔	Winter Park Village Webster Avenue and Denning Drive	Forest City Road, All American Boulevard, Edgewater Drive, Denning Drive	87,278	No Sunday service
24	Millenia Boulevard/Vineland Road	Washington Shores Washington Shores SuperStop	↔	Orlando Orlando International Premium Outlets	Bruton Road, Millenia Boulevard	41,277	
25	Mercy Drive/Shader Road	Downtown Orlando Lynx Central Station	↔	Princeton/Silver Star Lynx Operations Center	Washington Street, Mercy Drive, Shader Road	236,785	
26	Pleasant Hill Road/Poinciana	Kissimmee Kissimmee station	↔	Poinciana Poinciana Walmart	Pleasant Hill Road	236,353	
28	East Colonial Drive/Azalea Park	Downtown Orlando Lynx Central Station	↔	Azalea Park Semoran Boulevard and Curry Ford Road	Colonial Drive, Semoran Boulevard	297,026	
29	East Colonial Drive/Goldenrod Road	Downtown Orlando Lynx Central Station	↔	Goldenrod Forsyth Road and Aloma Boulevard	Colonial Drive, Forsyth Road/Goldenrod Road	316,905	
36	Lake Richmond	Downtown Orlando Lynx Central Station	↔	Lake Richmond Prince Hall Boulevard and Bruton Boulevard	Rio Grande Avenue, L.B. McLeod Road	80,765	
37	Pine Hills/Florida Mall	Pine Hills Pine Hills Transfer Center	↔	Florida Mall Florida Mall SuperStop	Hiawassee Road, Kirkman Road, Universal Boulevard, Sand Lake Road	938,143	Valencia College West is only served weekdays
38	Universal Orlando/International Drive Express	Downtown Orlando Lynx Central Station	↔	Orlando Destination Parkway SuperStop	I-4, Universal Boulevard, International Drive	439,912	Select trips extend to/from Shingle Creek Resort
40	Americana Boulevard/Universal Orlando	Downtown Orlando Lynx Central Station	↔	Universal Orlando Universal Orlando Employment Center	Division Avenue, Michigan Street, Americana Boulevard, Conroy Road	507,720	Stops at Orlando Health/Amtrak station; Select AM weekday inbound trips begin at Universal Orlando CityWalk
42	International Drive/Oak Ridge Road/Orlando International Airport	Orlando Destination Parkway SuperStop	↔	Orlando International Airport Terminal A	International Drive, Oak Ridge Road, Sand Lake Road	835,881	Stops at Sand Lake Road station; First daily eastbound trips depart from Orlando Premium Outlets; First daily westbound trips depart from Florida Mall
43	Winter Park/Lee Road/Pine Hills	Pine Hills Pine Hills Transfer Center	↔	Winter Park Lakemont Avenue and Aloma Avenue	Powers Drive, Clarcona Oconee Road, Lee Road	146,521	Stops at Winter Park station; First westbound weekday and Saturday trips depart from Rosemont SuperStop
44	Hiawassee Road/Zellwood/Apopka	Pine Hills Pine Hills Transfer Center	↔	Zellwood Anthony House	Hiawassee Road, Apopka Boulevard, Orange Blossom Trail	151,938	
48	West Colonial Drive/Powers Drive	Downtown Orlando Lynx Central Station	↔	Pine Hills Pine Hills Transfer Center	Colonial Drive, Powers Drive	528,527	
49	West Colonial Drive/Pine Hills Road/Rosemont	Downtown Orlando Lynx Central Station	↔	Rosemont Rosemont SuperStop	Colonial Drive, Pine Hills Road, Rosewood Way	568,420	
51	Conway Road	Downtown Orlando Lynx Central Station	↔	Orlando International Airport Terminal A	Robinson Street, Conway Road	211,117	
54	Old Winter Garden Road	Downtown Orlando Lynx Central Station	↔	Ocoee West Oaks Mall	Washington Street, Old Winter Garden Road	115,755	No Sunday service
55	West US-192/Four Corners	Kissimmee Kissimmee station	↔	Four Corners US-192 and Legacy Boulevard	Main Street, Vine Street, US-192	515,366	Select weekend trips extend to Four Corners Walmart
56	West US-192/Magic Kingdom	Kissimmee Kissimmee station	↔	Walt Disney World Disney University	Main Street, Vine Street, US-192, World Drive	464,554	Early morning weekday trips originate at Plaza del Sol; Service interruption between 8:30 PM and 10:30 PM between Transportation and Ticket Center and Disney University due to Happily Ever After fireworks show at Magic Kingdom
57	John Young Parkway	Kissimmee Kissimmee station	↔	Washington Shores Washington Shores SuperStop	John Young Parkway	182,612	No Sunday service
60	LYMMO Orange Line	Downtown Orlando Terry Avenue and Livingston Street (Creative Village)	↻	North-South Circulator	Loop: Livingston Street, Magnolia Avenue, South Street, Orange Avenue, Church Street, Magnolia Avenue, Livingston Street, Garland Avenue, Amelia Street, Terry Avenue	288,034	Fare-free; Stops at LYNX Central Station
61	LYMMO Lime Line	Downtown Orlando Orange Avenue and Gore Street (Beardall Senior Center)	↺	North-South Circulator	Counterclockwise Loop: Orange Avenue, Roaslind Avenue, Marks Street, Orange Avenue, Anderson Street, Delaney Avenue, Gore Street	37,006	Fare-free
62	LYMMO Grapefruit Line	Downtown Orlando South Street and Magnolia Avenue (City Hall)	↻	East-West Circulator	Clockwise Loop: South Street, Terry Avenue, Church Street, Westmoreland Drive, Central Boulevard, Summerlin Avenue, Church Street, Magnolia Avenue	267,436	Fare-free
102	Orange Avenue/South US-17/US-92	Downtown Orlando Lynx Central Station	↔	Altamonte Springs Altamonte Springs station	Orange Avenue, Orlando Avenue, Semoran Boulevard	449,830	Stops at Maitland station, Winter Park station, and AdventHealth station
104	East Colonial Drive	Downtown Orlando Lynx Central Station	↔	University of Central Florida UCF SuperStop	Colonial Drive, Econlockhatchee Trail, Alafaya Trail	506,223	
105	West Colonial Drive	Downtown Orlando Lynx Central Station	↔	Ocoee Blackwood Avenue and Old Winter Garden Road	Colonial Drive	519,642	Early morning weekday and Saturday Inbound trips begin at West Oaks Mall Superstop; All Sunday Inbound trips begin at West Oaks Mall SuperStop; Select late morning trips short-turn at West Oaks Mall Superstop; Sunday outbound trips do not serve West Oaks Mall Superstop
106	North US-441 (Orange Blossom Trail)/Apopka	Downtown Orlando Lynx Central Station	↔	Apopka Apopka SuperStop	US-441/Orange Blossom Trail	506,896	
107	US-441 (Orange Blossom Trail)/Florida Mall	Downtown Orlando Lynx Central Station	↔	Florida Mall Florida Mall SuperStop	US-441/Orange Blossom Trail	873,426	
108	South US-441 (Orange Blossom Trail)/Kissimmee	Kissimmee Kissimmee station	↔	Florida Mall Florida Mall SuperStop	US-441/Orange Blossom Trail	447,396	
125	Silver Star Road	Downtown Orlando Lynx Central Station	↔	Ocoee West Oaks Mall SuperStop	Mills Avenue, Silver Star Road, Clarke Road	742,118	Stops at AdventHealth station
300	Disney/Orlando Express	Downtown Orlando Lynx Central Station	↔	Walt Disney World Disney University	I-4, Buena Vista Drive, Bonnet Creek Parkway, World Drive	292,011	First inbound trip of the day departs from Transportation and Ticket Center
301	Disney Direct/Pine Hills	Pine Hills Pine Hills Transfer Center	↔	Walt Disney World Disney Springs Transfer Center	Kirkman Road, I-4	34,348	1 daily inbound trip departs at 5:25 PM; 2 daily outbound trips depart at 5:55 AM (weekdays)/5:56 AM (weekends) and 2:15 PM (weekdays)/2:20 PM (weekends)
302	Disney Direct/Rosemont	Rosemont Rosemont SuperStop	↔	Walt Disney World Disney Springs Transfer Center	Pine Hills Road, Colonial Drive, Raleigh Street, Kirkman Road, I-4	22,195	1 daily inbound trip departs at 5:30 PM; 1 daily outbound trip departs at 5:53 AM (weekdays)/5:55 AM (weekends)
303	Disney Direct/Washington Shores	Pine Hills Pine Hills Transfer Center	↔	Walt Disney World Disney University	John Young Parkway, Bruton Road, Vineland Road, I-4, Buena Vista Drive, Bonnet Creek Parkway, Buena Vista Drive, World Drive	19,150	1 daily inbound trip departs at 4:38 PM (weekdays)/4:48 PM (weekends); 1 daily outbound trip departs at 5:57 AM (weekdays)/6:05 AM (weekends)
304	Disney Direct/Rio Grande Avenue/Vistana	Downtown Orlando Orange Blossom Trail and Anderson Street	→	Orange County Caribe Royale Resort	EPCOT Center Drive, World Center Drive	39,922	1 daily northbound trip departs at 4:36 PM (weekdays)/4:39 PM (weekends); 2 daily southbound trips depart at 6:01 AM and 2:20 PM
304	Disney Direct/Rio Grande Avenue/Vistana	Downtown Orlando Orange Blossom Trail and Anderson Street	←	Orange County FL-535 and Meadowcreek Drive	EPCOT Center Drive, World Center Drive	39,922	1 daily northbound trip departs at 4:36 PM (weekdays)/4:39 PM (weekends); 2 daily southbound trips depart at 6:01 AM and 2:20 PM
306	Disney Direct/Poinciana	Poinciana Poinciana Walmart	↔	Walt Disney World JW Marriott Bonnet Creek Resort & Spa	Poinciana Boulevard, Osceola Parkway, Victory Way, Buena Vista Drive, Chelonia Parkway	26,304	Stops at Poinciana station; 1 daily northbound trip departs at 6:04 AM (weekdays)/6:22 AM (weekends); 1 daily southbound trip departs at 5:15 PM
307	Disney Circulator	Walt Disney World Disney Springs Transfer Center	↺	Walt Disney World EPCOT Cast Member Area/Bonnet Creek Resorts	Counterclockwise Loop: Buena Vista Drive, Back Stage Lane, Chelonia Parkway, Buena Vista Drive	68,559	
311	Disney/Orlando International Airport/Destination Parkway Express / East-West Fast Link	Walt Disney World Disney Springs Transfer Center	↔	Orlando International Airport Terminal A	I-4, Destination Parkway, Sand Lake Road	281,129	Stops at Sand Lake Road station
350	Destination Parkway/SeaWorld/Disney Express	Downtown Orlando Lynx Central Station	↔	Walt Disney World Disney Springs Transfer Center	I-4, Destination Parkway, Palm Parkway, Hotel Plaza Boulevard	423,781	
405	Apopka Circulator	Apopka Apopka SuperStop	↺		Loop: Park Avenue, Martin Street, Vick Road, Welch Road, Park Avenue, Central Avenue, Cleveland Street, Ocoee Apopka Road	56,751	
407	Kissimmee/Orlando International Airport/Medical City FastLink	Orlando International Airport Terminal A	↔	Kissimmee Kissimmee station	Jeff Fuqua Boulevard, FL-417, Veterans Way, Simpson Road	34,628	Limited-stop express service
418	Meadow Woods/Lake Nona/Florida Mall FastLink	Florida Mall Florida Mall SuperStop	↔	Lake Nona Orlando/Lake Nona VA Medical Center	Orange Blossom Trail, Wetherbee Road, FL-417	64,518	Limited-stop express service; Stops at Meadow Woods station
426	Poinciana Circulator	Poinciana Poinciana Walmart	↺		Loop: Doverplum Avenue, KOA Street, Marigold Avenue, Laurel Avenue, Monterey Road, Marigold Avenue, Walnut Street, Amiens Way, Chestnut Street, Coyote Road, Tiger Road	90,534	
436N	FL-436/Altamonte Springs/Apopka	Altamonte Springs Altamonte Springs station	↔	Apopka Apopka SuperStop	Altamonte Drive, Semoran Boulevard, Main Street	340,600	
436S	FL-436/Altamonte Springs SunRail/Orlando International Airport	Orlando International Airport Terminal A	↔	Altamonte Springs Altamonte Springs station	Semoran Boulevard	807,774	
441	South US-441 (Orange Blossom Trail) FastLink	Downtown Orlando Lynx Central Station	↔	Kissimmee Kissimmee station	Orange Blossom Trail	102,148	Limited-stop express service
701	West Oaks Mall/Orange Technical College West Campus	West Oaks West Oaks Mall SuperStop	↔	Orange Technical College West Campus	Clarke Road, Silver Star Road, FL-429	11,104	Two daily westbound trips (early morning and late morning); Two daily eastbound trips (late morning and afternoon)
705	West Colonial Drive/Winter Garden Circulator	West Oaks West Oaks Mall SuperStop	↺		Colonial Drive	77,124	No Sunday service

== Facilities ==
LYNX's administrative offices are located at LYNX Central Station.

LYNX has two operations centers for the maintenance and storage of its bus fleet. Most bus routes (85%) are serviced by the LYNX Operations Center (LOC), located in Orlando off John Young Parkway. Osceola Satellite Facility (OSF), located in Kissimmee, services most Osceola County routes.

In 2022, LYNX began considering sites for a third operations center. The $80 million facility will be located in Osceola County and will support up to 250 vehicles.

== Rates ==
A standard adult one-way fare is $2, which includes a free transfer within 90 minutes of activation. (The transfer cannot be used on the same Link, e.g. for round trips.) Payment can be made in cash, credit card (tap-to-pay), or via the PawPass app. A rolling 24-Hour Pass, which lasts 24 hours from activation, is available for $4.50 upon request.

LYNX offers a rolling 7-Day Pass for $16 and a rolling 30-Day pass for $50. These passes may be purchased at LYNX Central Station, online, via the PawPass app, or at Orlando-area retailers. Up to three riders under 7 can board for free with fare-paying rider; additional children (or children without adults) require a $1 fare.

Discounted fare IDs are available to youth (age 7 - 18 and/or currently in high school), seniors (age 65+), Medicare card holders, and disabled people. Patrons with a discounted fare ID can buy passes for half price.

Fares are waved for UCF students with valid UCF ID.
