= Church Street Station =

Historic train station in downtown Orlando, Florida

Church Street
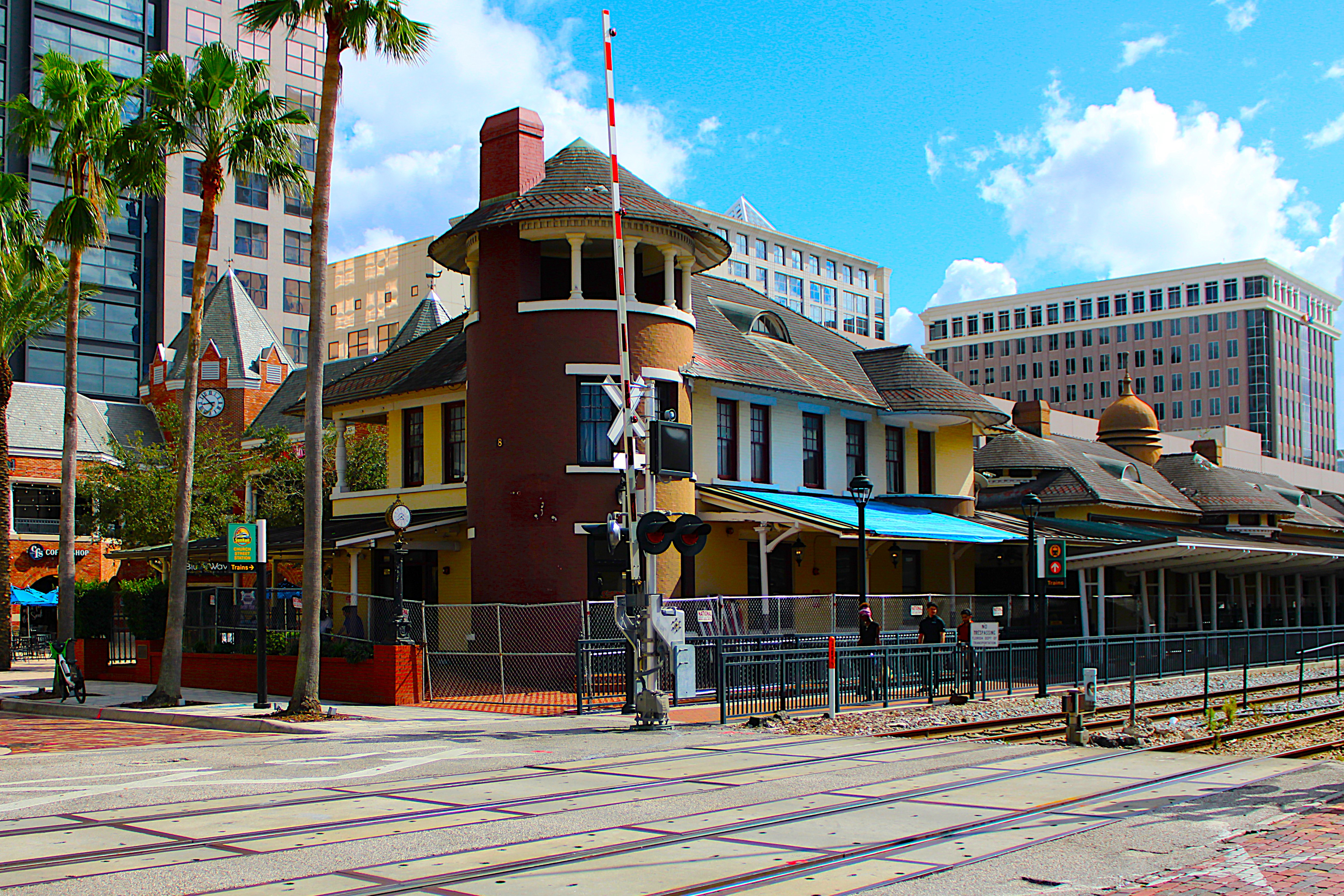
- The Old Orlando Railroad Depot built in 1889 still stands alongside the modern SunRail station

General information
- Location: 4 Depot Place, Orlando, Florida
- Coordinates: 28°32′24″N 81°22′50″W
- Owner: Florida Department of Transportation
- Platforms: 2 side platforms
- Tracks: 2
- Connections: : Lymmo Grapefruit Line, Lymmo Orange Line

Construction
- Structure type: At-grade
- Parking: Street and garage parking
- Cycle facilities: Yes
- Accessible: Yes

Other information
- Fare zone: Orange

History
- Opened: 1889
- Rebuilt: 2013

Passengers
- FY 2026: 103,741 ▲2.6% (SunRail)

Services
Preceding station	SunRail	Following station
Orlando Health/Amtrak toward Poinciana	SunRail	Lynx Central toward DeLand
- Old Orlando Railroad Depot
- U.S. National Register of Historic Places
- Interactive map of Old Orlando Railroad Depot
- Coordinates: 28°32′24″N 81°22′50″W
- Built: 1889
- Architect: T. B. Cotter
- Architectural style: Eclectic Victorian, Shingle Style
- NRHP reference No.: 76000604
- Added to NRHP: 22 April 1976
Location

Church Street Station, also called the Old Orlando Railroad Depot, is a historic train station and commercial development in Orlando, Florida. The historic depot and surrounding buildings house a retail and entertainment center. The complex also contains a stop for SunRail, the commuter rail service of the Greater Orlando area.

The station building was constructed in 1889 by South Florida Railroad. It served several different railroads until 1926, when passenger services transferred to what is now the Orlando Health/Amtrak station. In the 1970s, the station and nearby buildings were bought and developed into an entertainment center. After its original owner sold the development in 1989, Church Street Station experienced a period of decline. In 2013, St. Petersburg businessman Mark Ferguson signed a 20-year lease with an option to purchase. Ferguson opened a sports bar/restaurant in 2017. It closed and was sold in 2018. The property has been divided into sections. Lincoln Property bought the majority of the property. The southbound station is planned to be moved to a new high rise nearby.

== Station ==
=== Atlantic Coast Line Railroad ===
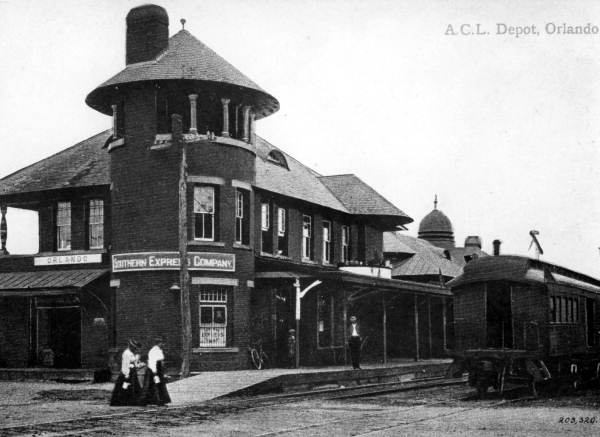
The Depot, as it appeared c. 1910.

The station was originally built by the South Florida Railroad in 1889 (although some sources say it was built in 1890) to serve Orlando. The South Florida Railroad was bought out by the Plant System in 1893, which in turn was taken over by the Atlantic Coast Line Railroad in 1902. The station also served the Tavares, Orlando and Atlantic Railroad and the Orlando and Winter Park Railway. In 1926 passenger operations were transferred to a new station built by the Coast Line. The Church Street depot still survives to this day on the National Register of Historic Places.

=== SunRail ===
The SunRail commuter rail project uses the historic Church Street Rail Depot as one of three stops in downtown Orlando. A new platform on the same side of the tracks was built down the block from the Church Street Station, within walking distance of Orlando City Hall. Church Street Station is typical of most SunRail stations featuring canopies consisting of white aluminum poles supporting sloped green roofs and includes ticket vending machines, ticket validators, emergency call boxes, drinking fountains, and separate platforms designed for passengers in wheelchairs. The station is located along the former CSX A-Line (originally constructed by the South Florida Railroad) and is one of two located in the central business district, providing easy access to the new Dr. Phillips Center for the Performing Arts and hotel development within the same block; Camping World Stadium, which recently underwent a complete renovation; Inter.co Stadium, home of the Orlando City SC MLS team; and the Kia Center and proposed entertainment complex, home of the Orlando Magic NBA team

== Night club complex ==
Entrepreneur Bob Snow opened Rosie O'Grady's Good Time Emporium on July 19, 1974. Based on the Rosie O'Grady's/Seville Quarter complex he opened in Pensacola, Florida in the late 1960s, Rosie O'Grady's Good Time Emporium/Church Street Station in Orlando saw great popular success in the 1970s and 1980s, It operated as an attraction offering admission to multiple nightclubs of various formats facilitating "club hopping" for a single price in a monolithic location.

=== The 1970s and 1980s ===
Started in the 1904 Hotel Orlando building, it grew to span both sides of Church Street, both sides of the railroad tracks, and to include the Old Orlando Railroad Depot. At one time it was the fourth largest attraction in Florida. Ken Ibold in 2002 wrote in Florida Trend that Church Street Station, "once hosted more annual visitors than anywhere else in Florida". It was a joint venture with John Hankins and was sold by Snow in 1989. Walt Disney World emulated the successful formula, opening its Pleasure Island club district amidst Church Street Station's peak years of success, as did Universal Orlando with its CityWalk complex. Snow proceeded to develop a similar venue in Las Vegas, "Main Street Station" that at inception shared many club concepts with the Orlando facility.

One of the popular attractions was the Cheyenne Saloon and Opera House. Fashioned after a western saloon the three-story bar, restaurant and entertainment venue was a filming location for the Nashville Network every Friday for seven years in the 1980s. Country music artists including Garth Brooks and Alan Jackson appeared there before they became famous. Snow was among the investors in the Church Street Station in 2007 when he planned to reopen the Cheyenne Saloon. After reopening in 2008 Snow was unable to come to an agreement with the new owners of the property and it closed again in 2009.

Rosie O'Grady's Flying Circus offered balloon rides providing views of downtown Orlando and the nearby Cape Canaveral Air Force Station. Joseph Kittinger was vice president of air operations. Balloon rides were still available in 1994 for US$100.

=== Decline ===
As an entertainment, drinking and dining complex, Church Street Station eventually experienced a steep decline in attendance and had largely closed as a club-hop by the end of the 1990s. The demise of the attraction as a leading nightlife complex has been directly attributed to Walt Disney World's opening of Pleasure Island a competing complex featuring multiple clubs with a single entry fee. The addition of a large retail complex in 1985 failed to reinvigorate the location.

==== Baltimore Gas and Electric ====
Besides competition in the entertainment and retail business, owner Baltimore Gas and Electric (BGE) increased overhead for retailers as much as 55% while not providing support and promotion. BGE invested 25% of the cost of building the retail complex in 1985 and purchased the Church Street Station property in 1989 but was not willing to make the needed investments to keep the property competitive and viable. BGE wrote off $12M to reflect the decline in the value of the property in March 1997.

In 1991 the complex had 50 shops and specialty stores. A 24,000-square-foot (2,200 m^{2}) event venue, the Presidential Ballroom was built in 1994. That year in addition to the ballroom/banquet facility, the Church Street Station complex consisted of three restaurants, five showrooms, private parlor rooms, a wine cellar, a shopping complex, the train depot with convenience store, shops and corporate office space. The Church Street Station had 800 employees in 1994. With foreclosures and serial disappointments duplicating the successes of the past, the property has struggled. BGE revised the decline in value to $18.5M in October 1997 and wrote off an additional loss in value of $15.4M in 1998. Several attempts have been made by multiple owners to re-create the success of the 1970s and mid-1980s. One included a planned, in 2004, Paris Hilton branded nightclub.

Church Street station was the fifth largest entertainment complex in Orlando in 1998, attracting 550,000 thousand visitors. That year revenue was $20.8M but it had an operating loss of about $1M. Enic PLC of London bought the property for $11.5 million in 1999 and reportedly lost $2M a year for two years before selling it for $15.9M in 2001.

==== F.F. South & Co. ====
A local real estate partnership F.F. South & Co, bought the Church Street Station in 2001 and promptly closed two of the oldest remaining attractions, Rosie O' Grady's Good Time Emporium and the haunted house, The Terror on Church Street. The property bought by F.F. South & Co was 6.68 acres (2.70 ha) including 242,179 sq ft (22,499 m^{2}) of building improvements and 123,060 sq ft (11,433 m^{2}) vacant land. That year long time tenant Buffalo Trading Co closed its store after almost 20 years. In December the catering business which operated in the Presidential Ballroom venue that had been added in 1994 was closed by F.F. South & Co., at that time only a single, just opened, restaurant was operating in the complex. The ballroom had been popular since opening and the company walked away from as much as $1M of business when closed with no advance notice. Church Street Station had been listed as the sixth largest meeting facility in central Florida in July 2001.

==== Haunted? ====
Local restaurateurs who had signed a $14,175 a month lease for the building which housed Lili Marlene's Aviator's Pub and Restaurant in the 1980s backed out claiming the building was haunted in 2005. A letter from their lawyer alleged construction workers had seen ghosts and the owner's had failed to inform them. The letter cited their Jehovah's Witness faith. The landlord offered to have an exorcism performed and sued stating there were no ghosts in, on, above, below or around the property. A ghost tour operator asserted the building was haunted by the ghosts of slain illegitimate children of prostitutes who worked in the Strand Hotel upstairs which had been a de facto brothel.

==== Lou Pearlman ====
President of F.F. South & Co Robert Kling became involved with Lou Pearlman, who came to own the property. Pearlman's legal troubles led to a foreclosure lawsuit. Pearlman's corporate offices for Trans Continental Airlines Inc. in the Church Street Station were seized in February 2007 and its assets went into receivership. Bank of America sought to foreclose on the station property. Pearlman had been running an investment scam alleging access to investment in the employee retirement plan of Trans Continental Airlines, while transferring the money to his other businesses and using it for loan payments. When Pearlman was involved the owner of the property was identified as FF Station LLC, the company filed for bankruptcy protection in February 2007. Also in February 2007 Pearlman's Church Street offices were raided by agents from the FBI, IRS, FDIC and Florida Office of Financial Regulation. Miscellaneous belongings left behind by Pearlman were auctioned off at the Church Street Station on June 12, 2007.

When he purchased the property in 2003 Pearlman received a $1.5M economic development loan from the city. City Commissioner Daisy Lynum gave him a key to the city in 2004 and even as his fraud was revealed felt he still deserved it stating, "It was Lou Pearlman who jump started all the downtown development". A 2007 article in the St. Petersburg Times stated he was, "unable to revive the night life that once made the Church Street complex a major attraction". The only bidder Cameron Kuhn purchased the site for the minimum bid of $34M at a bankruptcy auction about what was owed to creditors of FF Station.

=== The 21st century ===
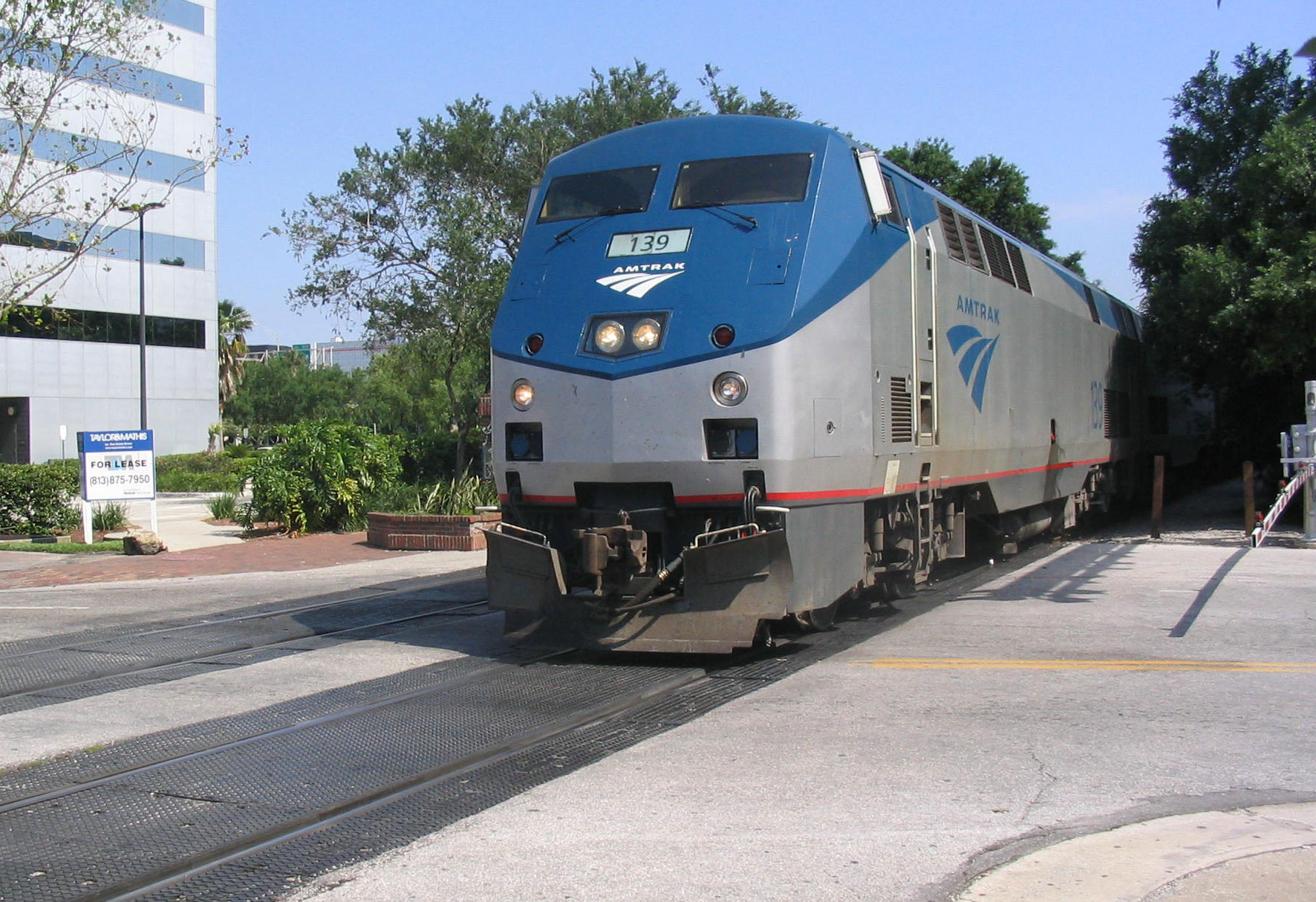
A southbound Amtrak train heads for Orlando Amtrak station, but must cross Central Boulevard before passing by Church Street Station first.

==== Bob Snow returns ====
In 2007 a group of investors including founder Bob Snow, developer Cameron Kuhn and Ceviche tapas bar owner Gordon Davis planned a revitalization of the property. The Cheyenne Saloon & Opera House reopened in 2008 under Snow's direction at the time Kuhn retained ownership of much of the property. By 2009 a new high rise condominium, 55 West, had been built at the Church Street Station, when another foreclosure was started.

==== Trains go and come ====
In creating the attraction Snow had brought a historic locomotive and train cars to the station. The locomotive Frisco 0–6–0 No. 3749, built in 1913 by Baldwin, worked as switcher in Pensacola, the southernmost extension of the St. Louis–San Francisco Railway. The rail cars included a Union Pacific Dome, a Seaboard Air Line Diner and a 10 section Monta Rosa Pullman lounge observation car. In 2012 these were moved to the Florida Railroad Museum in Parrish, Florida to make room for construction of the SunRail platform. Another rail car was donated to the Chesapeake and Ohio Railway Museum by original partner John Hankins. SunRail revived the station in 2014 as a commuter rail stop.

==== MoJo and Ferg's come and go ====
The former Rosie O’ Grady's Good Time Emporium restaurant and entertainment venue was sold in June 2010 for $2.2M to downtown commercial property owners Frank Hamby and Margaret Casscells. The new owners planned to transform the 14,335-square-foot (1,331.8 m^{2}) building into the New Orleans-style MoJo Bar & Grill.

In 2013 Mark Ferguson bought the property and opened (in 2017) a dining and entertainment venue and bar, Ferg's Depot, as a second location of his popular St. Petersburg sports bar the venue was 15,000 sq ft (1,400 m^{2}) with 5,000 sq ft (460 m^{2}) air-conditioned. Four years in the making it consisted of three buildings, the old waiting room for the train station was a 100-person dining room, the St. Petersburg sports bar was emulated in a section called Ferg's Tap House, the third section was an indoor/outdoor oyster bar. The restaurant became a nightclub after 10:30 at night, restrooms were in shipping containers that looked like trains and a Tiki bar was open to the street. Ferguson began renovations with an ad campaign, "We've been working on the railroad", saying, "It's something we're going to build and have for a long time". It was listed for sale in 2017 for $4.7M. This venture closed on August 4, 2018.

==== Recent developments ====
Passenger rail service returned in 2014 when SunRail revamped the station as a commuter rail stop. A New Orleans themed event venue, The Orchid Garden, in the Church Street Station complex was renovated for $2M and open in 2014.

Lincoln Property purchased most of the property of the Church Street Station in November 2017. Plans for large scale redevelopment are underway in 2020.

Today in the immediate vicinity there are a number of restaurants and bars, an event venue, high-rise apartments and condominiums, and a franchise of the gay-themed restaurant Hamburger Mary's, which closed in 2024.

The Kia Center across Interstate 4 an entertainment arena, within close walking distance of Church Street Station, opened in 2010. The arena is home to the Orlando Magic of the NBA. In 2019 a local tour company planned to base their office and open a bar with live entertainment in the station.

== Timeline ==
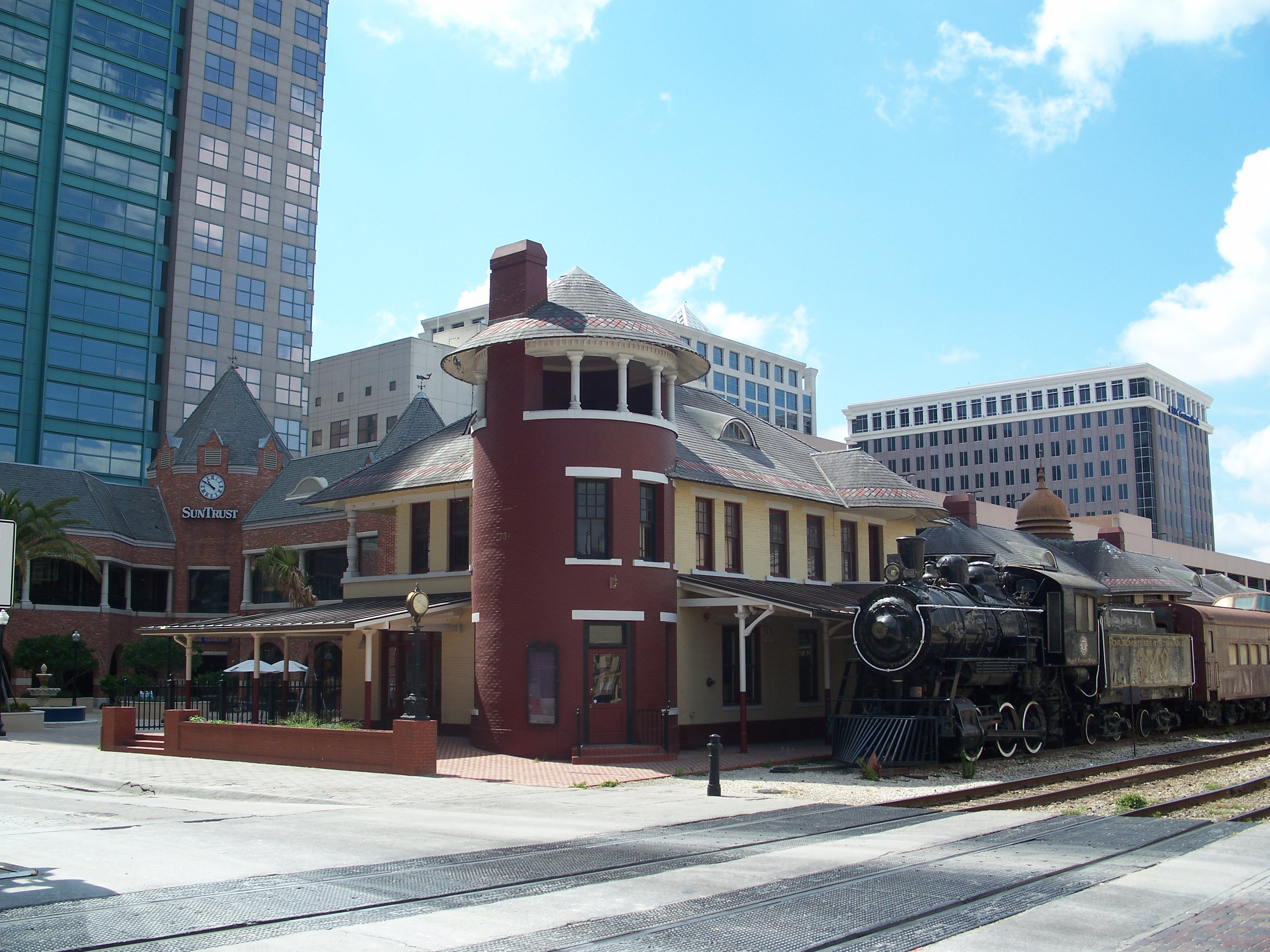
Pre-SunRail view, with historic locomotive on display

- 1889: Station building constructed by South Florida Railroad
- 1926: Passenger service is discontinued at the station
- 1972: Entrepreneur Bob Snow announces plan for a downtown Orlando entertainment complex.
- 1974: Snow opens Rosie O'Grady's.
- 1976: The station is added to the National Register of Historic Places
- 1982: Cheyenne Saloon & Opera House opens.
- 1985: Church Street Station draws 1.7 million visitors, making it the fourth-largest tourist attraction in the state after Walt Disney World, Sea World and Busch Gardens.
- 1988: Snow sells 50 percent interest in Church Street Station.
- 1989: Snow sells remainder of his interest to Constellation Real Estate Group a subsidiary of Baltimore Gas and Electric Co. for an estimated $48M.
- 1994: Church Street Station completes major expansion with a 24,000-square-foot (2,200 m^{2}) Presidential Ballroom for $5.5 million.
- 1998: Church Street Station loses $1M on revenue of $20.85M, attracts only 550,000 visitors.
- 1999: Baltimore Gas & Electric sells Church Street Station to Enic PLC, a British firm, for $11.5M.
- 2001: Enic PLC sells Church Street Station to F.F. South & Co. for $15.9M.
- 2002: Lou Pearlman buys into Church Street Station.
- 2003: Pearlman buys the property through his company FF Station.
- 2007: Pearlman's legal trouble and arrest lead to seizure of his corporate offices in the station and trigger a foreclosure lawsuit against Church Street Station.
- 2007: Cameron Kuhn purchases Church Street Station at bankruptcy court auction for $34.M.
- 2008: Church Street Station retail opens including The Cheyenne Saloon by Bob Snow, Bliss Ultra Night Club, Brick and Fire Pizza and Wine Company, Ceviche Tapas Restaurant and Bar, The Dessert Lady and Hamburger Mary's.
- 2008: Lender Tremont Net Funding LLC files to foreclose on the property while Mr. Kuhn tries to retain control & negotiate the re-sell of the complex.
- 2010: Historic Church Street Station RR FRISCO 0-6-0 Switcher #3749 Locomotive, which had been on display for many years at the station, is acquired by the City of Orlando and put up for sale.
- 2012: RR FRISCO 0-6-0 Switcher Locomotive #3749 is donated by the City of Orlando and relocated to the Florida Railroad Museum facility in Parrish.
- 2013: St. Petersburg businessman Mark Ferguson signs a 20-year lease with an option to purchase.
- 2014: SunRail commuter rail begins service with its platform beside the original station
- 2017: Lincoln Properties purchases the majority of the property.
