= Orlando Health/Amtrak station =

Passenger train station in Orlando, Florida

Orlando, FL
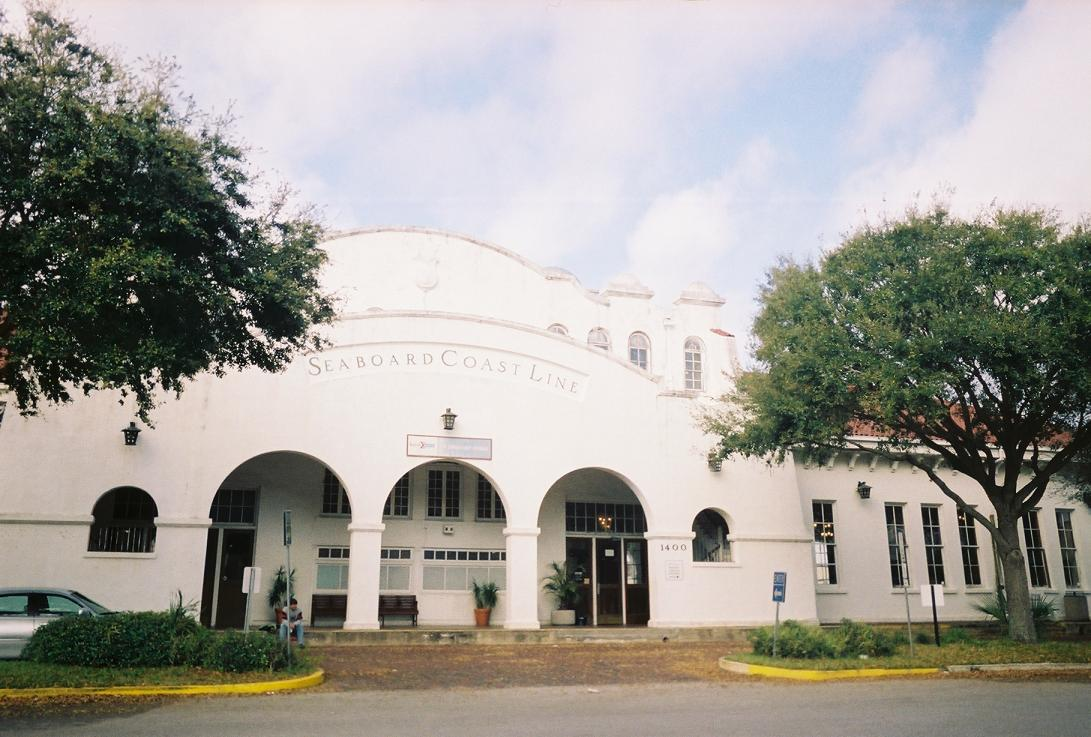
- Front entrance to the 1926-built Orlando station. Originally used by the Atlantic Coast Line Railroad, now by Amtrak.

General information
- Location: 1400 Sligh Boulevard; Orlando, Florida; United States
- Coordinates: 28.52590°N 81.38130°W
- Owner: City of Orlando
- Platforms: 1 side platform, 1 island platform
- Tracks: 3
- Connections: Amtrak Thruway Lynx: 40

Construction
- Parking: Yes
- Cycle facilities: Yes
- Accessible: Yes

Other information
- Station code: Amtrak: ORL
- Fare zone: Orange (SunRail)

History
- Opened: 1926 (ACL)
- Rebuilt: May 1, 2014 (SunRail)

Passengers
- FY 2025: 145,057 (Amtrak)
- FY 2026: 71,007 ▲6.2% (SunRail)

Services
Preceding station	Amtrak	Following station
Kissimmee toward Miami	Floridian	Winter Park toward Chicago
Kissimmee toward Miami	Silver Meteor	Winter Park toward New York
Preceding station	SunRail	Following station
Sand Lake Road toward Poinciana	SunRail	Church Street toward DeLand
Former services
Preceding station	Amtrak	Following station
Winter Park toward Los Angeles	Sunset Limited 1993–2005	Kissimmee 1993-1996 toward Miami
Kissimmee toward St. Petersburg	Floridian	Winter Park toward Chicago
Kissimmee toward Miami	Silver Star	Winter Park toward New York
Preceding station	Atlantic Coast Line Railroad	Following station
Pine Castle toward Tampa	Main Line	Winter Park toward Richmond
- Atlantic Coast Line Station
- U.S. National Register of Historic Places
- Architect: A.M. Griffin; W. T. Hadlow
- Architectural style: Mission/Spanish Revival
- NRHP reference No.: 100007973
- Added to NRHP: July 28, 2022
Location

Orlando Health/Amtrak station, also known as Orlando station, is a train station in Orlando, Florida. It is served by Amtrak, the national railroad passenger system of the United States, and SunRail, the commuter rail service of Greater Orlando, as well as local and intercity buses. It serves Amtrak's Silver Meteor and Floridian lines. Built in 1926, the historic station is located in Downtown Orlando approximately one mile south of the central business district, near the campus of Orlando Health. Serving 160,442 passengers at last measure in 2013, The station is Amtrak's fifth busiest in the Southeastern United States; it is the second busiest Amtrak station in Florida, behind the Sanford station of the Auto Train.

== History ==
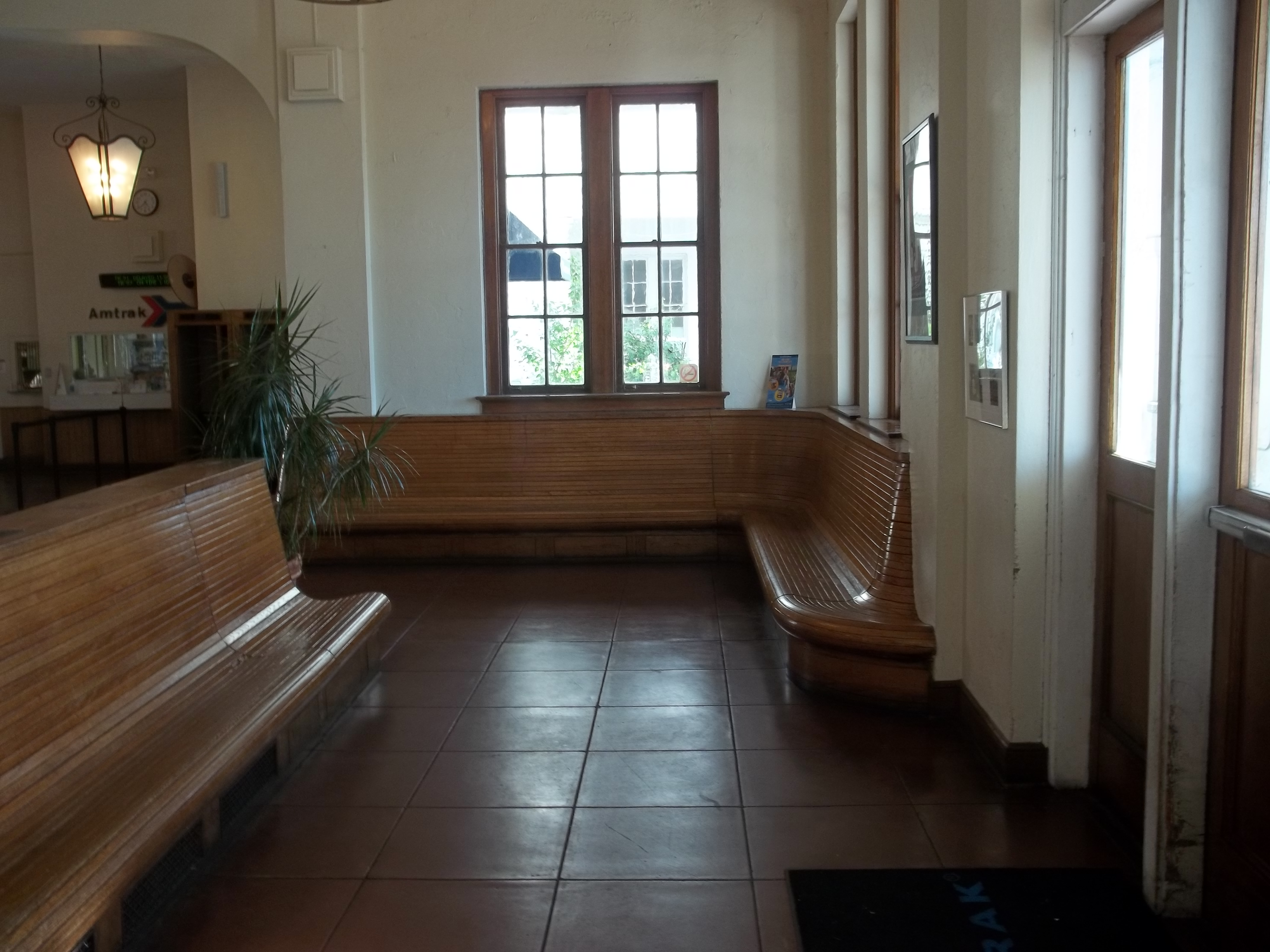
Part of the restored interior.

The station was built in 1926 by A.M. Griffin and W. T. Hadlow for the Atlantic Coast Line Railroad (ACL). The building was designed in the Spanish Mission style. It became part of the Seaboard Coast Line Railroad after the Coast line merged with the Seaboard Air Line Railroad in 1967.

=== Service in peak years ===
Prior to the decline in operations in the 1950s and 1960s, several long distance trains operated by the ACL ran through the station.

- Champion (West Coast) New York – Sarasota
- Havana Special New York and the train's Sarasota section

Shuttle sections that fed off these trains in Jacksonville, to points south. In Jacksonville connections could be made with trains that originated in either Chicago or Cincinnati:

- City of Miami, Dixie Flagler, Dixie Flyer, Dixie Limited, Flamingo, Seminole, South Wind, Southland

For a period after a strike on the Florida East Coast Railway interrupted service on its coastal route, from 1964 to 1968, the ACL and its successor, the SCL, ran trains making local stops down the Atlantic Coast from Jacksonville to Miami, notably including a stop in Orlando. This provided the first direct rail service from Orlando to Miami.

=== Amtrak ===
Amtrak continued the Champion, and also added a St. Petersburg section to the Silver Star that also called at Orlando. Until 1979, the St. Petersburg section of the Chicago-originating Floridian stopped in Orlando as well. The Champion was folded into the Silver Meteor in 1979, and both it and the Silver Star continued to serve Orlando via Tampa Bay sections (which terminated in St. Petersburg before 1984 and in Tampa after 1984).

In 1993, the Sunset Limited was extended to South Florida, thus providing the first one-seat ride between Orlando and Miami since 1968. Starting in the fall of 1996, the Silver Meteor and Silver Star were routed through Orlando after both trains dropped their Tampa Bay sections. The Sunset Limited was shortened to Sanford. Later in the decade, the Sunset Limited was extended to Orlando again, where it stopped from 1996 until August 29, 2005. As a result of Hurricane Katrina, the Sunset Limited was suspended east of New Orleans in 2005. On November 10, 2024, the Silver Star was merged with the Capitol Limited as the Floridian.

=== SunRail ===
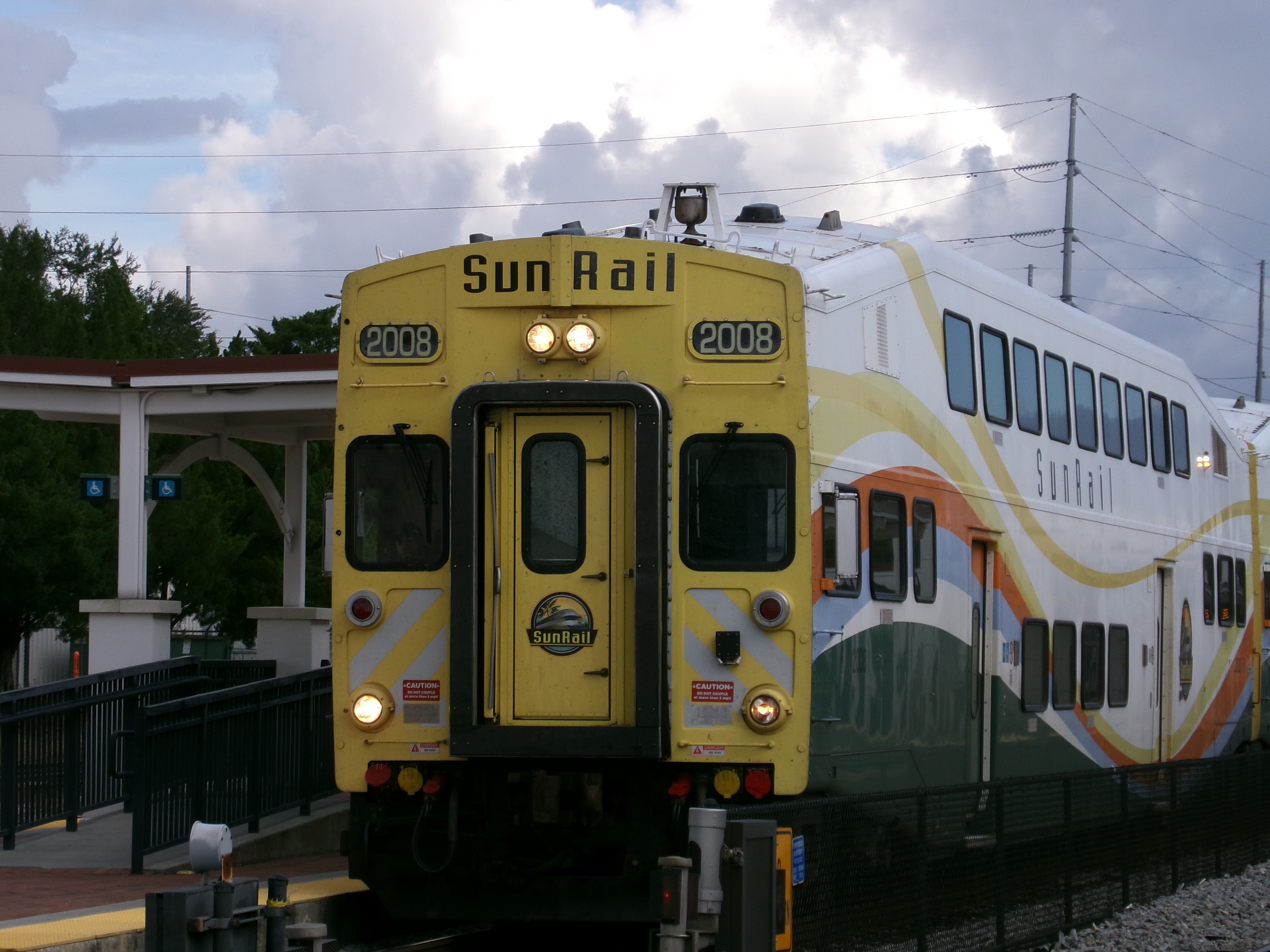
Sunrail 2008 leaving Orlando

In 2014, the City of Orlando started a project to build a second platform for use by the new SunRail commuter rail service. Unlike most SunRail stations, which feature shelters consisting of white aluminum poles supporting sloped green roofs, the station's canopies feature arches that resemble the mission-style architecture of the adjacent historic station's canopy. It also includes ticket vending machines, ticket validators, emergency call boxes, drinking fountains, and separate platforms designed for passengers in wheelchairs. The station was officially named Orlando Health/Amtrak Station due to its proximity to the main Orlando Health hospital campus, Orlando Regional Medical Center, the Arnold Palmer Hospital for Children and the Winnie Palmer Hospital for Women & Babies. The revamped station opened on May 1, 2014.

In August 2014, the City of Orlando announced a $2.1 million station restoration project for the historic building. The project, which was the first major renovation to the facility since 1990, included fixing cracks and leaks in the stucco walls and tile roof, pavement repairs, restroom upgrades, repainting of the building exterior, restoration of the original 1926 wood doors and windows, replacement and relocation of the air conditioning system to the roof of the building (which allowed the original entrance on the side of the building to be reopened), and the installation of a wheelchair ramp from the parking lot to the new station entrance. Work officially commenced on September 24, 2014, and was completed on June 29, 2015. The building was listed on the National Register of Historic Places in 2022.

The station also serves Amtrak Thruway buses and Lynx bus route 40. It is also the proposed terminus on the planned Orange Blossom Express commuter rail project out of Lake County.
