= Winter Park Village =

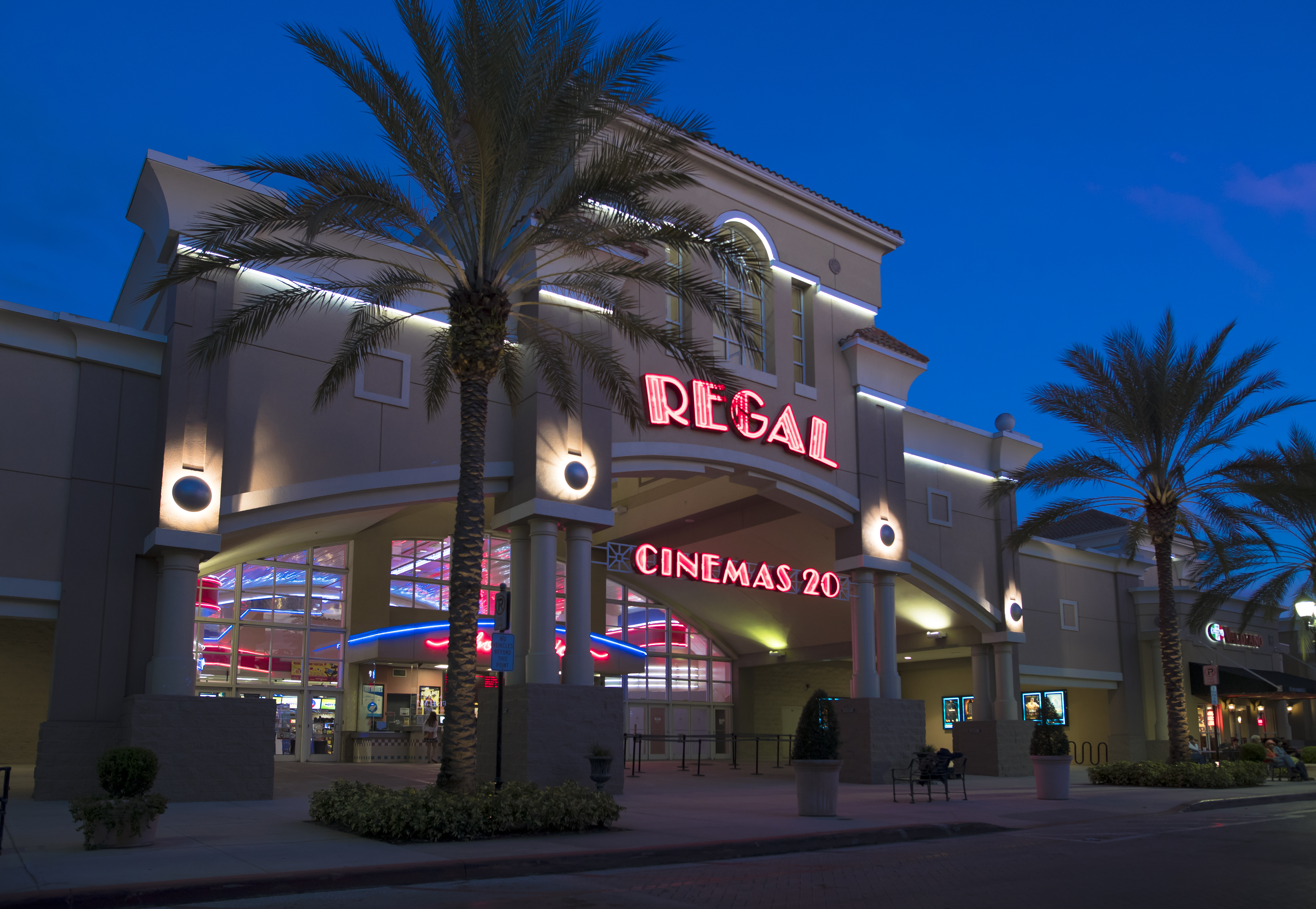
- Evening shot of Winter Park Village's Movie Theater
- Location: Winter Park, Florida, United States
- Coordinates: 28°36′06.9″N 81°21′44.2″W
- Address: 510 N Orlando Ave, Winter Park, Florida
- Opened: November 15, 1999 (Current outdoor shop); 1964 (original indoor mall)
- Closed: 1998 (original indoor mall)
- Developer: Casto
- Owner: Casto
- Public transit: 1, 9, 23, 102, 443
- Website: www.shopwinterparkvillage.net//

Winter Park Village is an outdoor shopping center in Winter Park, Florida, United States featuring many shops, restaurants, and a 20-screen Regal Cinemas. The center opened in 1999 on the site of the former Winter Park Mall.

The mall's anchor stores are Publix, Arhaus, Guitar Center, REI, and Regal Cinemas.

Restaurants include Brio Tuscan Grille, The Cheesecake Factory, Ruth's Chris Steak House and P.F. Chang's China Bistro.

== History ==
The site was originally home to Winter Park Mall, which was Greater Orlando's first enclosed shopping mall. The mall opened in 1964 and had Ivey's and JCPenney as the original anchor stores. At the time, the JCPenney store was the second-largest in the nation. A large section of the mall burned on Easter morning, April 6, 1969, in "the first major fire incident in the United States involving an enclosed shopping mall," and was rebuilt.

Ivey's was sold to Dillard's in 1990. Over the years, the mall lost popularity, as many shoppers preferred the Park Avenue, Winter Park's upscale shopping district, or newer malls in the area. JCPenney moved to Orlando Fashion Square in 1993 leaving Dillard's as the only anchor store. At the time, developers had begun seeking replacements for the JCPenney store, with prospective replacements including Belk and Parisian. After this, the mall's owners entered into a joint venture between Don M. Casto Organization and the Nikitine family for redevelopment. The mall was razed in 1998 except for the Dillard's store. However, Dillard's did not renew its lease in 1999, and the store was redeveloped.

Winter Park Village was officially dedicated on November 15, 1999, but some stores and restaurants such as Borders and P. F. Chang's China Bistro opened as early as March. The empty Dillard's building was divided into smaller spaces to house The Cheesecake Factory and Guitar Center on the lower level and 58 loft apartments on the upper level. The new center also included a new Albertsons supermarket and a Regal Cinemas. Albertsons closed in 2008 and was replaced with Publix. Borders closed in 2011 after the company decided to close all stores, and the building was demolished and replaced with two smaller buildings housing Chase and Starbucks. Chamberlins Market & Cafe—which was one of the only stores that remained from the Winter Park Mall—closed in 2016 with REI taking its place in 2017.

In 2024, a new Arhaus would be opening its doors at the mall.
