= Lynx Central Station =

Intermodal station in Orlando, Florida

LYNX Central
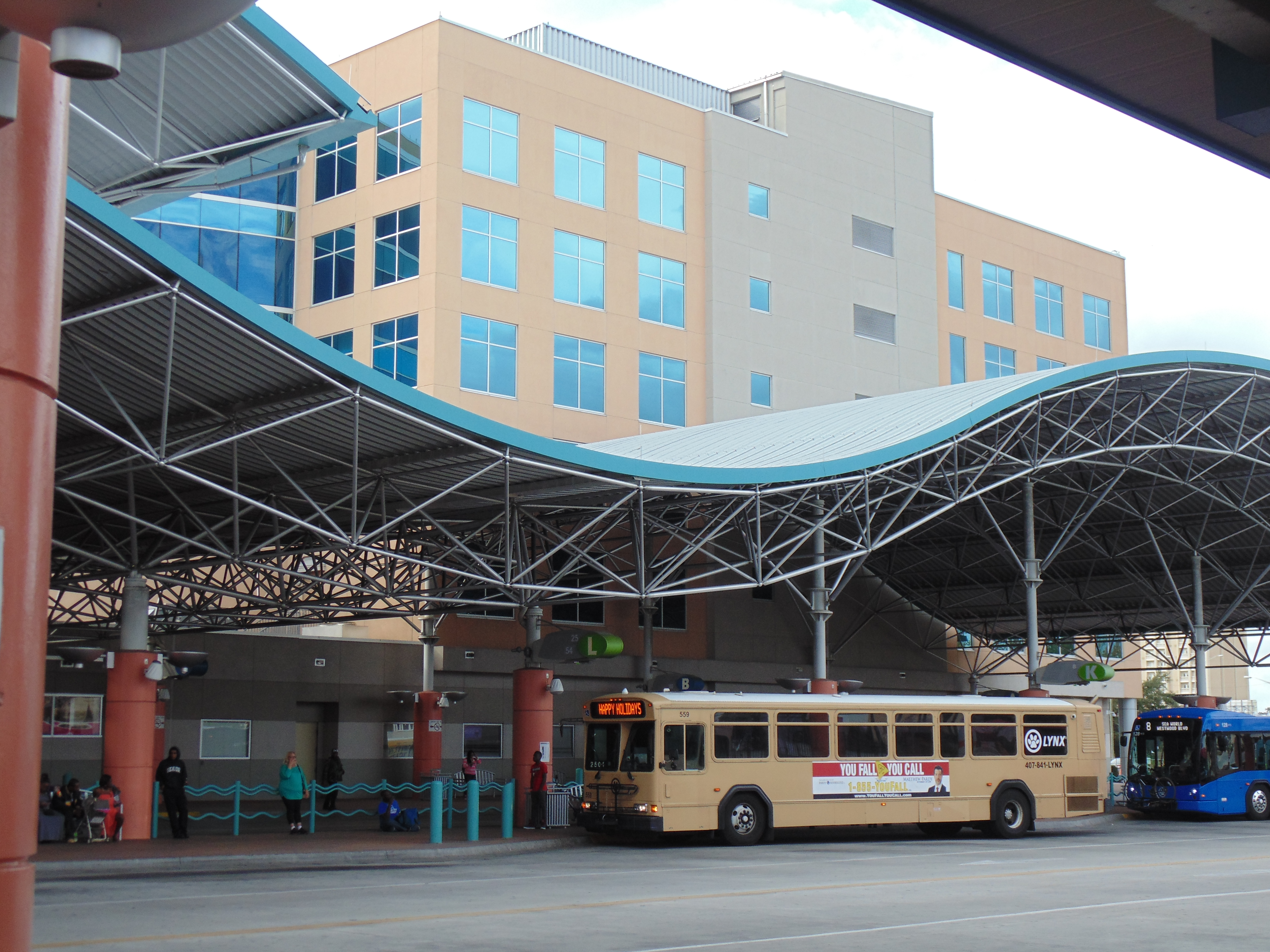
- Buses at station platform with LYNX offices in background

General information
- Location: 455 North Garland Avenue; Orlando, Florida
- Coordinates: 28.5485°N 81.3809°W
- Platforms: 2 side platforms
- Tracks: 2
- Bus routes: : 3, 7, 8, 11, 13, 15, 18, 19, 20, 21, 25, 28, 29, 36, 38, 40, 48, 49, 51, 54, 102, 104, 105, 106, 107, 125, 300, 350; FastLink: 441; LYMMO: Lime, Orange, SWAN (off-peak only)
- Bus stands: 27

Construction
- Structure type: At-grade
- Cycle facilities: Yes

Other information
- Fare zone: Orange

History
- Opened: November 14, 2004 (bus); April 30, 2014 (rail)

Passengers
- FY2026: 150,294 (SunRail) ▲8.7%

Services
| Preceding station | SunRail | Following station |
|---|---|---|
| Church Street toward Poinciana | SunRail | AdventHealth toward DeLand |
Location

LYNX Central Station is an intermodal transit station in Orlando, Florida. The station serves the SunRail commuter rail line, and it is also the main transfer center for LYNX, Orlando's public bus system. It is located near the interchange between Interstate 4 and Colonial Drive (SR 50).

LYNX Central Station is one of two SunRail stations located in Downtown Orlando, the other being Church Street Station. In addition to serving as a transfer center, LYNX Central serves the northern end of Downtown Orlando, including the Creative Village neighborhood, the Orange County Courthouse, the Middle District of Florida courthouse, the FAMU College of Law, UCF Downtown, and the Bob Carr Theater.

As of 2026, the station has the highest ridership of all SunRail stations, with 150,294 riders in the most recent fiscal year.

== Terminal ==
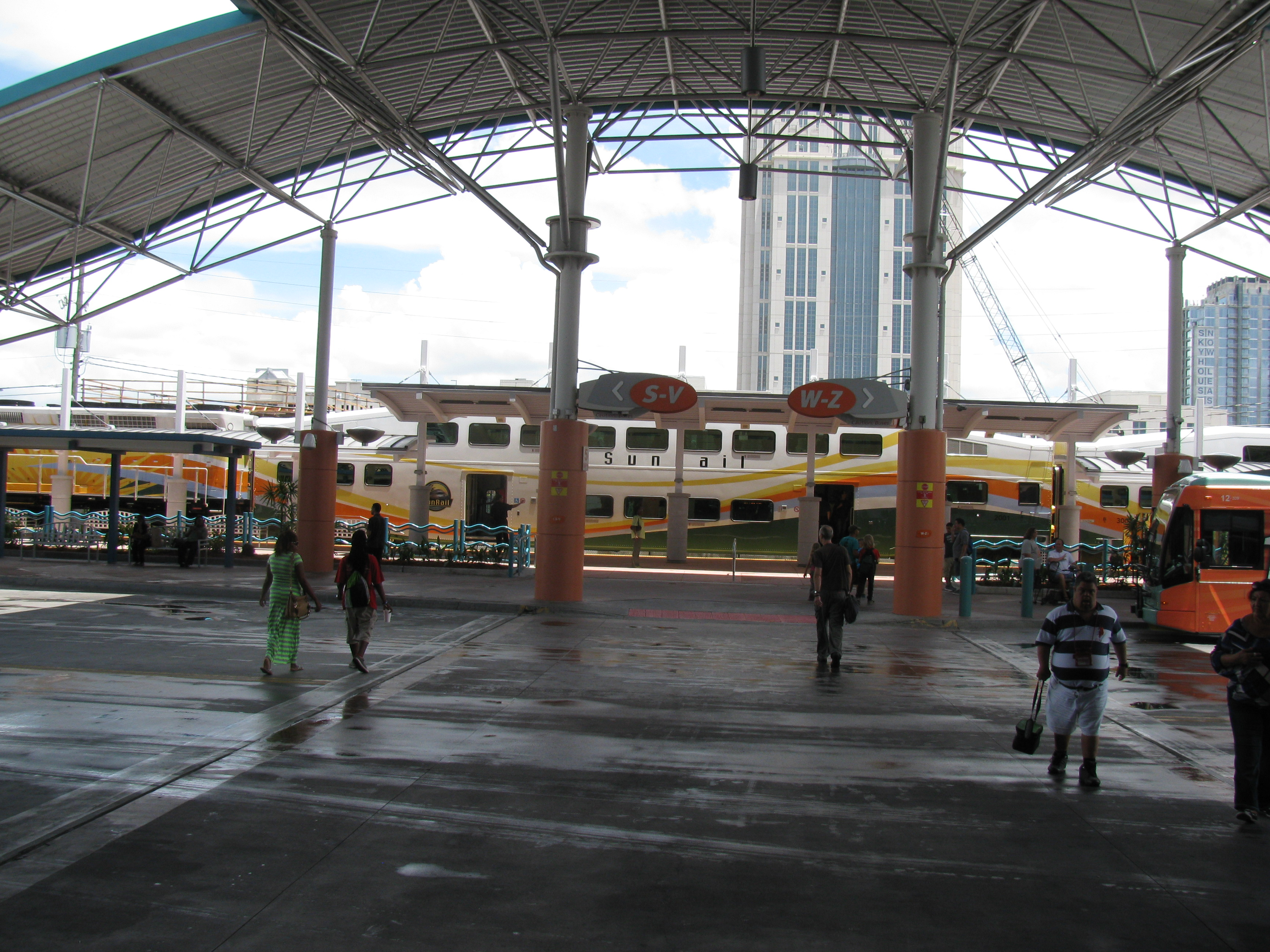
The station was built for quick transfer between the bus bays and SunRail platforms

LYNX Central Station is the main hub of the LYNX system, servicing 32 of LYNX's 79 routes. The 18,000-square-foot (1,700 m^{2}) bus terminal has 26 bus bays, a customer service counter, 2,400 square feet (220 m^{2}) of retail space, and an air-conditioned waiting area.

SunRail trains board on a pair of side platforms on the eastern end of the terminal, while buses for LYMMO, a free circulator route serving Downtown Orlando, board from a street stop on the south side of the terminal.

The terminal's distinctive wave-shaped canopies are 60 feet (18 m) tall and are accented with colored lights at night. The canopies were designed to prevent buildup of diesel exhaust fumes in the station by naturally cycling in fresher air.

== History ==
=== Opening ===
LYNX Central Station was opened on November 14, 2004, replacing a smaller transit facility on Central Street. The station was built at a cost of $30 million, most of which was provided through federal and state grants. The project included a 70,000-square-foot (6,500 m^{2}) office building attached to the station, which holds LYNX's administrative offices.

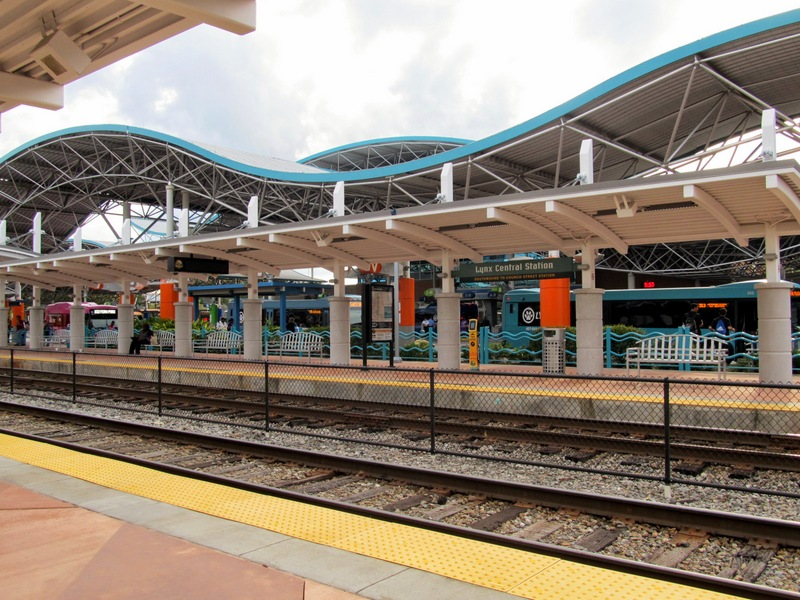
Completed SunRail platform with bus terminal in background

=== SunRail ===
The station was constructed along the former CSX A-Line corridor, which was first built in 1882 by the South Florida Railroad. The corridor had been studied for commuter rail and/or light rail usage since the 1990s, and LYNX Central Station was constructed next to the line for the purposes of allowing future rail connections.

Construction on the rail corridor began in 2011. SunRail held a soft opening for the LYNX Central platforms on April 4, 2014 and a grand opening ceremony at all Orlando stations on April 30, 2014.

== Development ==
A $200 million transit-oriented development adjacent to the station was announced shortly after SunRail construction commenced. The primary component of the project is Central Station on Orange (formerly Crescent Central Station), which consists of a 280-unit apartment complex and 14,600 square feet (1,360 m^{2}) of retail space.
