= Tupperware station =

Commuter rail station in Hunter's Creek, Florida, USA

Tupperware
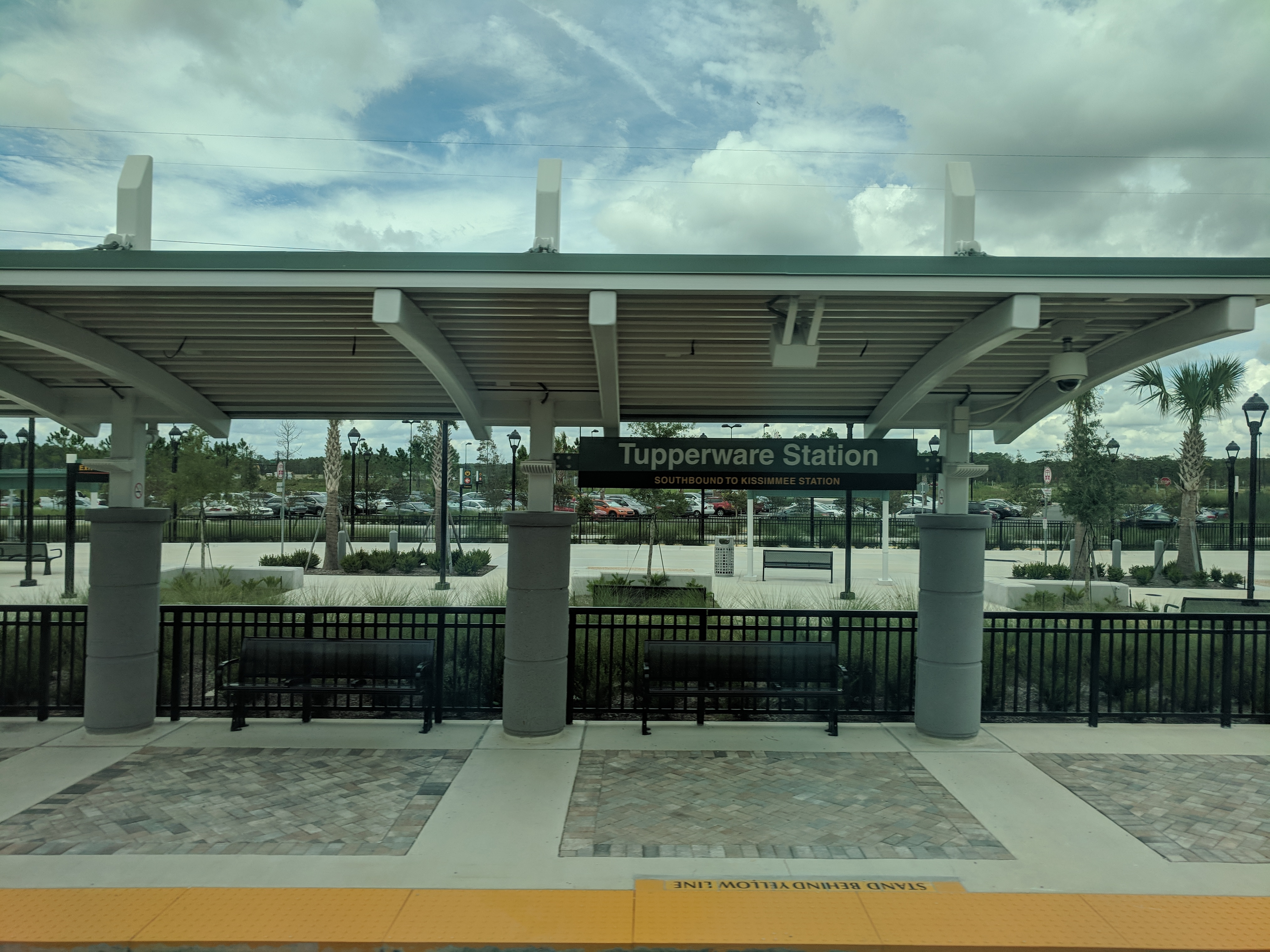
- Tupperware station platform in September 2018.

General information
- Location: 3205 Orange Avenue; Kissimmee, Florida
- Coordinates: 28.343265°N 81.390057°W
- Platforms: 2 side platforms
- Tracks: 2
- Connections: LYNX: NeighborLink 831

Construction
- Structure type: At-grade
- Parking: 110 spaces
- Cycle facilities: Yes
- Accessible: Yes

Other information
- Fare zone: Osceola

History
- Opened: July 30, 2018

Passengers
- FY26: 36,961 ▲7.4%

Services
Preceding station	SunRail	Following station
Kissimmee toward Poinciana	SunRail	Meadow Woods toward DeLand
Location

Tupperware station is a SunRail commuter rail station in Hunter's Creek, Florida. The station is located at the intersection of Osceola Parkway (CR 522) and Orange Avenue (CR 527), between Florida's Turnpike and Orange Blossom Trail (US 441). It is the northernmost SunRail station in Osceola County.

The station serves an emergency room operated by Orlando Health, as well as the headquarters of Tupperware Brands, which is located approximately 3/4 mile (1.2 km) east of the station on US 441. Gatorland is approximately 1 mile (1.6 km) north of the station, also on US 441.

As of 2026, the station had 36,961 riders in the most recent fiscal year. It is the least-ridden station in Osceola County and the second-least-ridden SunRail station overall, narrowly ahead of Maitland station.

== History ==
The station was originally named Osceola Parkway during planning. The station was renamed Tupperware after Tupperware Brands, whose headquarters is near the station, donated 10 acres (4.0 ha) of land for the station site. The station opened as part of the Phase 2 South extension on July 30, 2018.
