= Sand Lake Road station =

Railway station in Florida, United States

Sand Lake Road
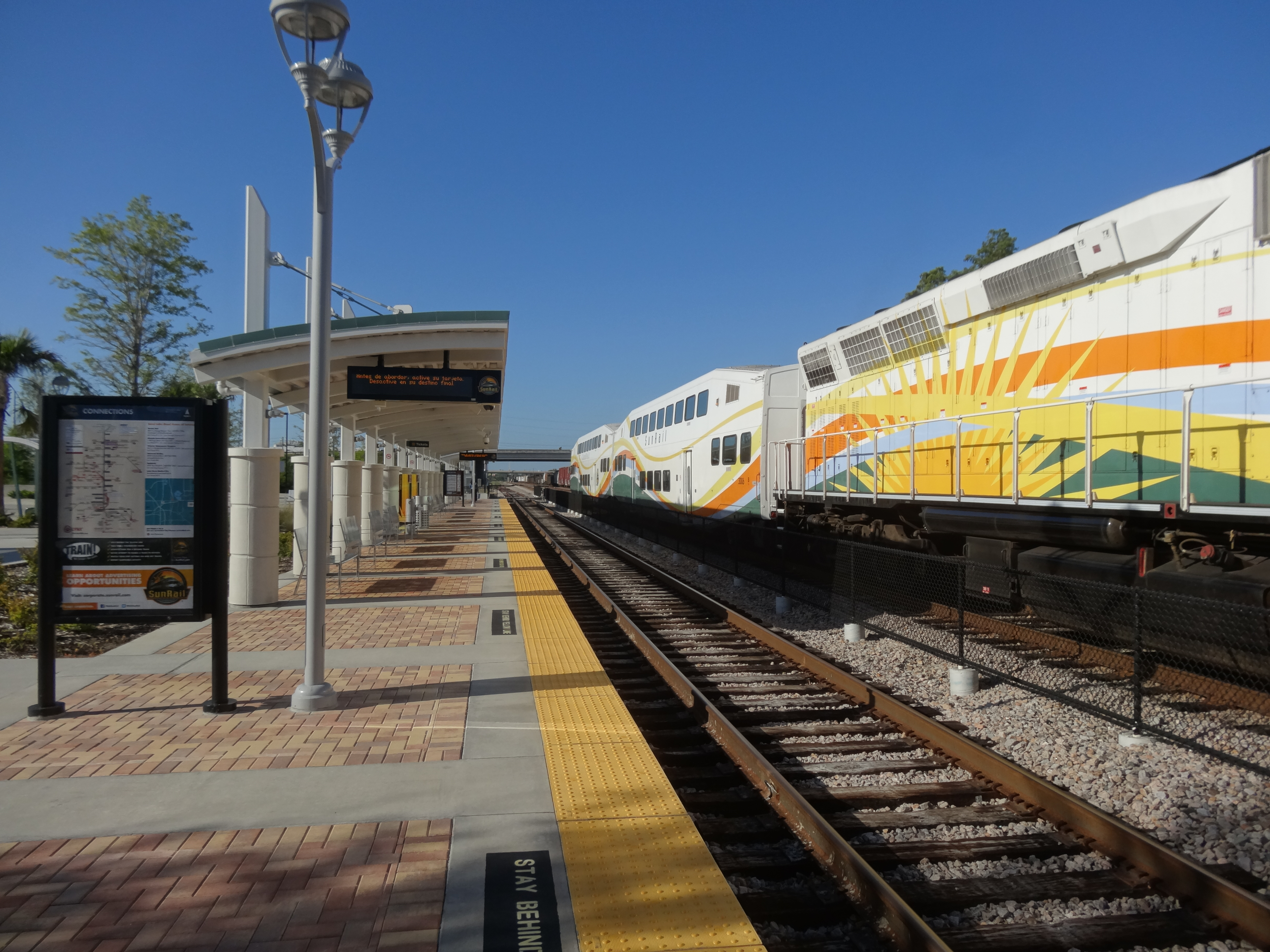
- Sunrail train at Sand Lake Road station in May 2015

General information
- Location: 8030 South Orange Avenue; Pine Castle, Florida
- Coordinates: 28.4530604°N 81.3665401°W
- Owner: Florida Department of Transportation
- Platforms: 2 side platforms
- Tracks: 2
- Connections: : 11, 18, 42, 111, 208, FastLink 418

Construction
- Structure type: At-grade
- Parking: 429 spaces
- Cycle facilities: Yes
- Accessible: Yes

Other information
- Fare zone: Orange
- Website: sunrail.com/station/sand-lake-road

History
- Opened: May 1, 2014

Passengers
- FY 2026: 67,395 ▲8.8%

Services
Preceding station	SunRail	Following station
Meadow Woods toward Poinciana	SunRail	Orlando Health/Amtrak toward DeLand
Terminus	SunRail Sunshine Corridor (proposed)	Orlando International Airport Terminus
Location

Sand Lake Road station is a train station in the Pine Castle area of Orange County, Florida. The station serves SunRail, the commuter rail service of Central Florida. The station was the southern terminus of SunRail up until July 30, 2018, when service was extended south to Poinciana. The station is the first passenger station to exist in Pine Castle since the decline of service from the Atlantic Coast Line Railroad.

== Station ==
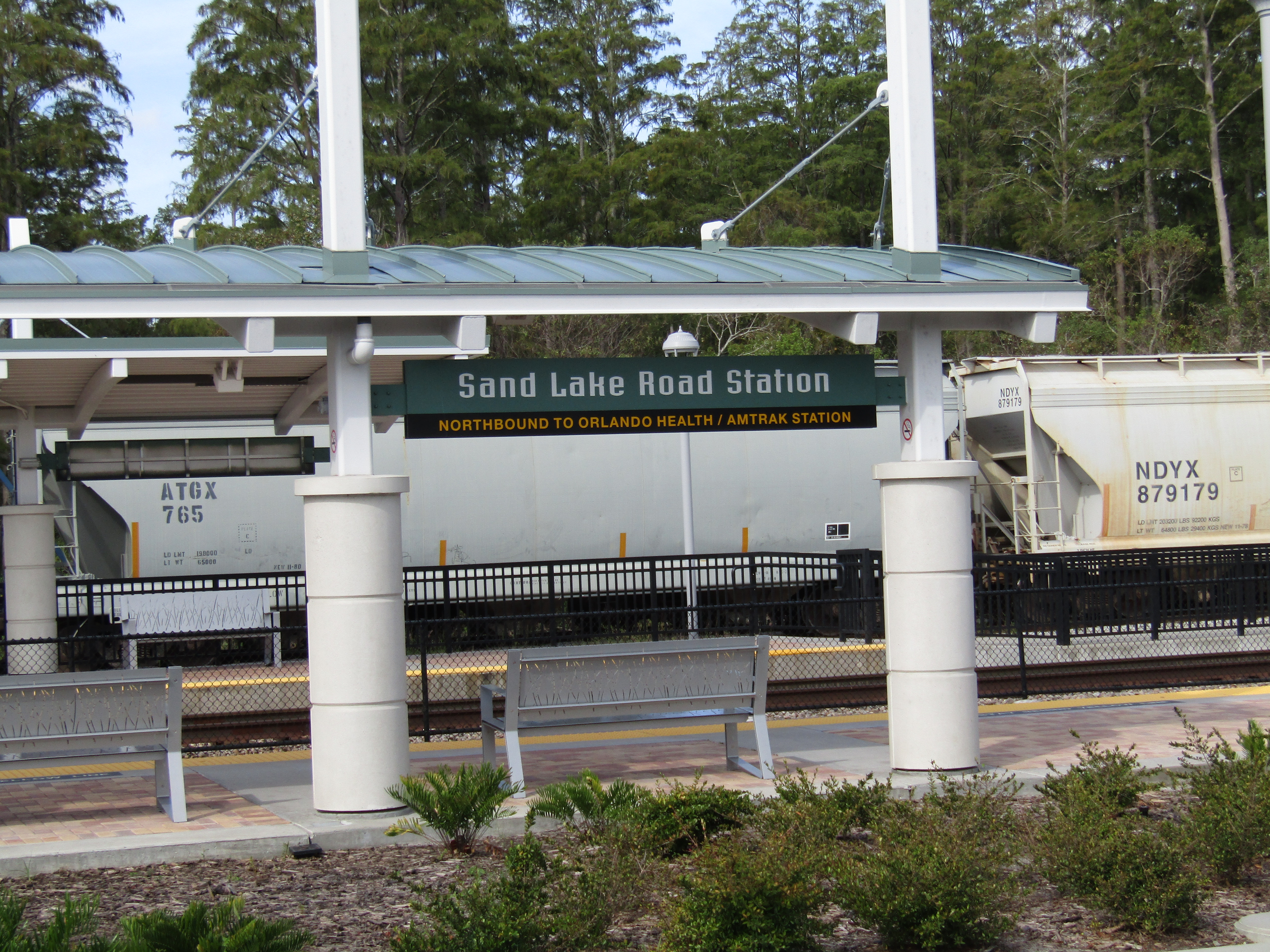
Sand Lake Road station in Orange County, Florida

The Sand Lake Road station began construction in 2013, built on a parcel of previously undeveloped land on Orange Avenue (SR 527), just north of Sand Lake Road. It is flanked by industrial buildings to the north, and a McDonald's restaurant to the south. Sand Lake Road Station is typical of most SunRail stations featuring canopies consisting of white aluminum poles supporting sloped green roofs and includes ticket vending machines, ticket validators, emergency call boxes, drinking fountains, and separate platforms designed for passengers in wheelchairs. The station is located along the former CSX A-Line (originally constructed by the South Florida Railroad) and is located just north of Taft Yard, a small CSX freight yard. Parking and bicycle lock facilities are provided, along with SunCard vending stations that take cash, credit or debit cards.

The station serves the communities of Pine Castle, Sky Lake, Belle Isle and Taft. It is also served by the Lynx bus system via Links 11, 18, 42 and 111, along with two new routes: Xpress Link 208, which connects it to the Lynx Intermodal Terminal in Kissimmee; and FastLink 418, which connects it to Meadow Woods, Lake Nona and The Florida Mall. Links 11,42 and 111 provide service to and from Orlando International Airport, while Links 42 and 111 provide service to SeaWorld Orlando, with Link 42 via the International Drive tourism area and Orange County Convention Center.

SunRail operates Monday through Friday. The first daily departures are at 6:03 am southbound and 6:10 am northbound. Departures are scheduled every 30 minutes during morning and evening commute times. During mid-day, trains run 60 to 90 minutes apart. The final daily departures are at 9:13 pm southbound and 10:20 pm northbound.
