= Florida's 9th congressional district =

U.S. House district for Florida

Coordinates: 28°07′55″N 81°12′06″W

- Map of district boundaries
- Representative: Darren Soto; D–Kissimmee
- Area: 2,620 mi^{2} (6,800 km^{2})
- Distribution: 89.9% urban; 10.1% rural
- Population (2025): 913,561
- Median household income: $85,804
- Ethnicity: 51.8% Hispanic; 30.0% White; 9.3% Black; 4.1% Asian; 3.5% Two or more races; 1.3% other
- Cook PVI: R+8

Florida's 9th congressional district is a congressional district in the U.S. state of Florida. Currently represented by Democrat Darren Soto, it stretches from eastern Orlando south-southeast to Yeehaw Junction. It also includes the cities of Kissimmee and St. Cloud.

From 2003 to 2012, it encompassed most of rural eastern Hillsborough County, northern parts of Pinellas County (including Clearwater) and the Gulf coast of Pasco County (including New Port Richey). The redistricting on January 3, 2013, completely reassigned the boundaries of the 9th district to mostly Osceola County with central Orange County plus northeastern Polk County, while the former 9th district became parts of the 10th, 11th, 12th (Pasco County) or the 14th district which split Hillsborough County with the 15th and 17th district. The 2013 redistricting also expanded the State of Florida from 25 to 27 districts, adding 2 in Miami - Dade.

== Recent election results from statewide races ==
Year	Office	Results
2008	President	Obama 59% - 40%
2010	Senate	Rubio 48% - 27%
2010	Governor	Sink 54% - 46%
2010	Attorney General	Bondi 49% - 44%
2010	Chief Financial Officer	Atwater 49% - 41%
2012	President	Obama 62% - 38%
2012	Senate	Nelson 67% - 33%
2014	Governor	Crist 55% - 45%
2016	President	Clinton 61% - 35%
2016	Senate	Murphy 55% - 41%
2018	Senate	Nelson 60% - 40%
2018	Governor	Gillum 61% - 38%
2018	Attorney General	Shaw 58% - 40%
2018	Chief Financial Officer	Ring 60% - 40%
2020	President	Biden 58% - 41%
2022	Senate	Demings 51% - 48%
2022	Governor	DeSantis 50% - 49%
2022	Attorney General	Moody 51% - 49%
2022	Chief Financial Officer	Hattersley 50.1% - 49.9%
2024	President	Harris 51% - 48%
2024	Senate	Mucarsel-Powell 50% - 48%

== Composition ==
For the 118th and successive Congresses (based on redistricting following the 2020 census), the district contains all or portions of the following counties and communities:

Orange County (8)

Belle Isle, Conway, Edgewood, Holden Heights, Hunter's Creek, Lake Hart, Lake Mary Jane, Meadow Woods, Orlando (part; also 10th), Pine Castle, Sky Lake, Southchase, Taft, Williamsburg

Osceola County (8)

All 8 communities

Polk County (2)

Loughman (part; also 18th), Poinciana (shared with Osceola County)

== List of members representing the district ==
Name	Party	Years	Cong– ress	Electoral history	Counties
District created January 3, 1963
Don Fuqua (Altha)	Democratic	January 3, 1963 – January 3, 1967	88th 89th	Elected in 1962. Re-elected in 1964. Redistricted to the 2nd district.	1963–1967; Calhoun, Franklin, Gadsden, Hamilton, Jackson, Jefferson, Lafayette, Leon, Liberty, Madison, Suwannee, Taylor, and Wakulla
Paul Rogers (West Palm Beach)	Democratic	January 3, 1967 – January 3, 1973	90th 91st 92nd	Redistricted from the 6th district and re-elected in 1966. Re-elected in 1968. Re-elected in 1970. Redistricted to the 11th district.	1967–1973; Broward, Collier, Glades, Hendry, Highlands, Martin, Okeechobee, Palm Beach, and St. Lucie
Louis Frey, Jr. (Winter Park)	Republican	January 3, 1973 – January 3, 1979	93rd 94th 95th	Redistricted from the 5th district and re-elected in 1972. Re-elected in 1974. Re-elected in 1976. Retired to run for Governor of Florida.	1973–1983; Brevard and Orange
Bill Nelson (Melbourne)	Democratic	January 3, 1979 – January 3, 1983	96th 97th	Elected in 1978. Re-elected in 1980. Redistricted to the 11th district.	1973–1983; Brevard and Orange
Michael Bilirakis (Tarpon Springs)	Republican	January 3, 1983 – January 3, 2007	98th 99th 100th 101st 102nd 103rd 104th 105th 106th 107th 108th 109th	Elected in 1982. Re-elected in 1984. Re-elected in 1986. Re-elected in 1988. Re-elected in 1990. Re-elected in 1992. Re-elected in 1994. Re-elected in 1996. Re-elected in 1998. Re-elected in 2000. Re-elected in 2002. Re-elected in 2004. Retired.	1983–1993; Hillsborough, Pasco, and Pinellas
Michael Bilirakis (Tarpon Springs)	Republican	January 3, 1983 – January 3, 2007	98th 99th 100th 101st 102nd 103rd 104th 105th 106th 107th 108th 109th	Elected in 1982. Re-elected in 1984. Re-elected in 1986. Re-elected in 1988. Re-elected in 1990. Re-elected in 1992. Re-elected in 1994. Re-elected in 1996. Re-elected in 1998. Re-elected in 2000. Re-elected in 2002. Re-elected in 2004. Retired.	1993–2003; Hillsborough, Pasco, and Pinellas
Michael Bilirakis (Tarpon Springs)	Republican	January 3, 1983 – January 3, 2007	98th 99th 100th 101st 102nd 103rd 104th 105th 106th 107th 108th 109th	Elected in 1982. Re-elected in 1984. Re-elected in 1986. Re-elected in 1988. Re-elected in 1990. Re-elected in 1992. Re-elected in 1994. Re-elected in 1996. Re-elected in 1998. Re-elected in 2000. Re-elected in 2002. Re-elected in 2004. Retired.	2003–2013 Hillsborough, Pasco, and Pinellas
Gus Bilirakis (Palm Harbor)	Republican	January 3, 2007 – January 3, 2013	110th 111th 112th	Elected in 2006. Re-elected in 2008. Re-elected in 2010. Redistricted to the 12th district.	2003–2013 Hillsborough, Pasco, and Pinellas
Alan Grayson (Orlando)	Democratic	January 3, 2013 – January 3, 2017	113th 114th	Elected in 2012. Re-elected in 2014. Retired to run for U.S. senator.	2013–2017 Orange, Osceola, and Polk
Darren Soto (Kissimmee)	Democratic	January 3, 2017 – present	115th 116th 117th 118th 119th	Elected in 2016. Re-elected in 2018. Re-elected in 2020. Re-elected in 2022. Re-elected in 2024. Re-elected in 2026.	2017–2023 Orange, Osceola, and Polk
Darren Soto (Kissimmee)	Democratic	January 3, 2017 – present	115th 116th 117th 118th 119th	Elected in 2016. Re-elected in 2018. Re-elected in 2020. Re-elected in 2022. Re-elected in 2024. Re-elected in 2026.	2023–2027 Orange, Osceola, and Polk

== Election results ==
=== 2002 ===
Florida's 9th Congressional District Election (2002)
Party	Candidate	Votes	%
Republican	Michael Bilirakis (incumbent)	169,369	71.46
Democratic	Chuck Kalogianis	67,623	28.53
No party	Others	16	0.01
Total votes		237,008	100.00
Republican hold			

=== 2004 ===
Florida's 9th Congressional District Election (2004)
Party	Candidate	Votes	%
Republican	Michael Bilirakis (incumbent)	284,035	99.92
No party	Others	243	0.08
Total votes		284,278	100.00
Republican hold			

=== 2006 ===
Florida's 9th Congressional District Election (2006)
Party	Candidate	Votes	%
Republican	Gus Bilirakis	123,016	55.91
Democratic	Phyllis Busansky	96,978	44.08
No party	Others	19	0.01
Total votes		220,013	100.00
Republican hold			

=== 2008 ===
Florida's 9th Congressional District Election (2008)
Party	Candidate	Votes	%
Republican	Gus Bilirakis (incumbent)	216,591	62.17
Democratic	Bill Mitchell	126,346	36.27
Independent	John Kalimnios	3,394	0.97
No party	Others	2,047	0.59
Total votes		348,378	100.00
Republican hold			

=== 2010 ===
Florida's 9th Congressional District Election (2010)
Party	Candidate	Votes	%
Republican	Gus Bilirakis (incumbent)	165,433	71.43
Democratic	Anita de Palma	66,158	28.57
Total votes		231,591	100.00
Republican hold			

=== 2012 ===
Florida's 9th Congressional District Election (2012)
Party	Candidate	Votes	%
Democratic	Alan Grayson	164,894	62.52
Republican	Todd Long	98,856	37.48
Total votes		263,750	100.00
Democratic gain from Republican			

=== 2014 ===
Florida's 9th Congressional District Election (2014)
Party	Candidate	Votes	%
Democratic	Alan Grayson (incumbent)	93,850	53.97
Republican	Carol Platt	74,963	43.11
Independent	Marko Milakovich	5,060	2.91
No party	Leon Leo Ray (write-in)	5	0.00
Total votes		173,878	100.00
Democratic hold			

=== 2016 ===
Florida's 9th Congressional District Election (2016)
Party	Candidate	Votes	%
Democratic	Darren Soto	195,311	57.5
Republican	Wayne Liebnitzky	144,450	42.5
Total votes		339,761	100.00
Democratic hold			

=== 2018 ===
Florida's 9th congressional district, 2018
Party	Candidate	Votes	%
Democratic	Darren Soto (incumbent)	172,172	58.0
Republican	Wayne Liebnitzky	124,565	42.0
Total votes		296,683	100.0
Democratic hold			

=== 2020 ===
2020 United States House of Representatives elections in Florida
Party	Candidate	Votes	%
Democratic	Darren Soto (incumbent)	240,724	56.02%
Republican	Bill Oslon	188,889	43.96%
Independent	Westward (write-in)	25	0.01%
Total votes		429,638	100.0
Democratic hold			

=== 2022 ===
2022 United States House of Representatives elections in Florida
Party	Candidate	Votes	%
Democratic	Darren Soto (incumbent)	108,541	53.64%
Republican	Scotty Moore	93,827	46.36%
Total votes		202,368	100.0
Democratic hold			

=== 2024 ===
2024 United States House of Representatives elections in Florida
Party	Candidate	Votes	%
Democratic	Darren Soto (incumbent)	178,785	55.13%
Republican	Thomas Chalifoux	138,076	42.58%
Independent	Marcus Carter	7,412	2.29
Total votes		324,273	100.0
Democratic hold			
