= Altamonte Springs station =

Commuter rail station in Altamonte Springs, Florida

Altamonte Springs
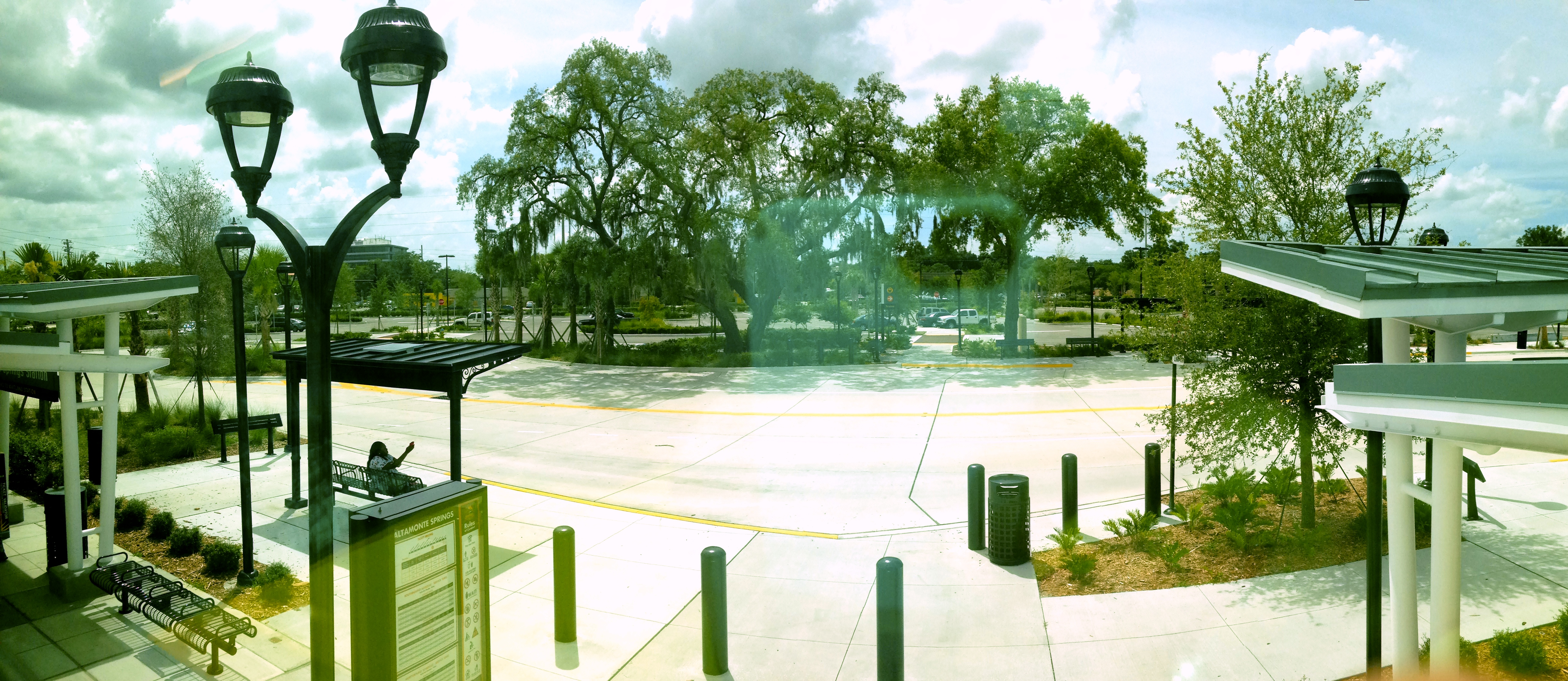
- View of the station from a train in July 2014

General information
- Location: 2741 S Ronald Reagan Blvd. Altamonte Springs, Florida
- Coordinates: 28°39′50″N 81°21′24″W
- Owner: Florida Department of Transportation
- Platforms: 2 side platforms
- Tracks: 2
- Connections: : 102, 436N, 436S; Scout

Construction
- Structure type: At-grade
- Parking: 326 spaces
- Cycle facilities: Yes
- Accessible: Yes

Other information
- Fare zone: SunRail: Seminole; Scout: Brantley

History
- Opened: May 1, 2014

Passengers
- FY2026: 60,811 ▲12.8%

Services
Preceding station	SunRail	Following station
Maitland toward Poinciana	SunRail	Longwood toward DeLand
Location

Altamonte Springs station is a SunRail commuter rail station in Altamonte Springs, Florida, serving SunRail, the commuter rail service of Central Florida. It is the southernmost SunRail station in Seminole County.

The station is located at the intersection of Altamonte Drive (SR 436) and Ronald Reagan Boulevard (CR 427), approximately 1 mile (1.6 km) east of the AdventHealth Altamonte Springs hospital and 1 1/2 miles (2.4 km) east of Uptown Altamonte, the city's primary shopping district. The station also serves the East Altamonte/Winwood area and nearby city of Casselberry.

== History ==
=== Predecessor ===
The rail corridor used by SunRail was originally constructed in 1880 by the South Florida Railroad. The SFR included a flag stop in the community of Snowville. In 1882, the Altamonte Land Hotel and Navigation Company purchased 1,200 acres (4.9 km^{2}) of land along the nearby Lake Orienta and Lake Adelaide to build a hotel for snowbird tourists. Both Snowville and the railroad stop were renamed Altamonte Station after the company's Altamonte Hotel, and they were renamed again to Altamonte Springs in 1887.

The SFR was purchased by the Atlantic Coast Line Railroad in 1902, and it became a component of what is now dubbed the CSX A-Line.

=== Modern station ===
After the SunRail project was approved in 2011, the city of Altamonte Springs held a groundbreaking ceremony for its station on January 27, 2012. The city also announced plans to build a replica of a circa-1900 railroad sign for use as a station decoration. Later that year, the city announced plans to purchase a former post office building near the site for future development. The station opened along with SunRail on May 1, 2014.

During SunRail's construction, Altamonte Springs was one of four cities (alongside Maitland, Casselberry, and Longwood) that announced plans for FlexBus, an on-demand shuttle that would link the station to other parts of the city. However, due to developmental delays, the service was never successfully launched. In 2016, the project was cancelled and replaced with an Uber discount code.

In 2015, the city approved construction of a 102-unit affordable housing project 1/3 mile (0.54 km) north of the station. The city also approved a 1-mile (1.6 km) extension of Amanda Street from Jackson Street to the station and a 3 1/2-mile (5.6 km) pedestrian trail connecting the station to the Seminole Wekiva Trail, which would also pass by Uptown Altamonte and Altamonte Mall.

In 2023, the city launched CraneRIDES, an autonomous shuttle in the Uptown Altamonte area. An extension of the shuttle route to the SunRail station has been proposed.
