= Meadow Woods station =

Train station on the SunRail

Meadow Woods
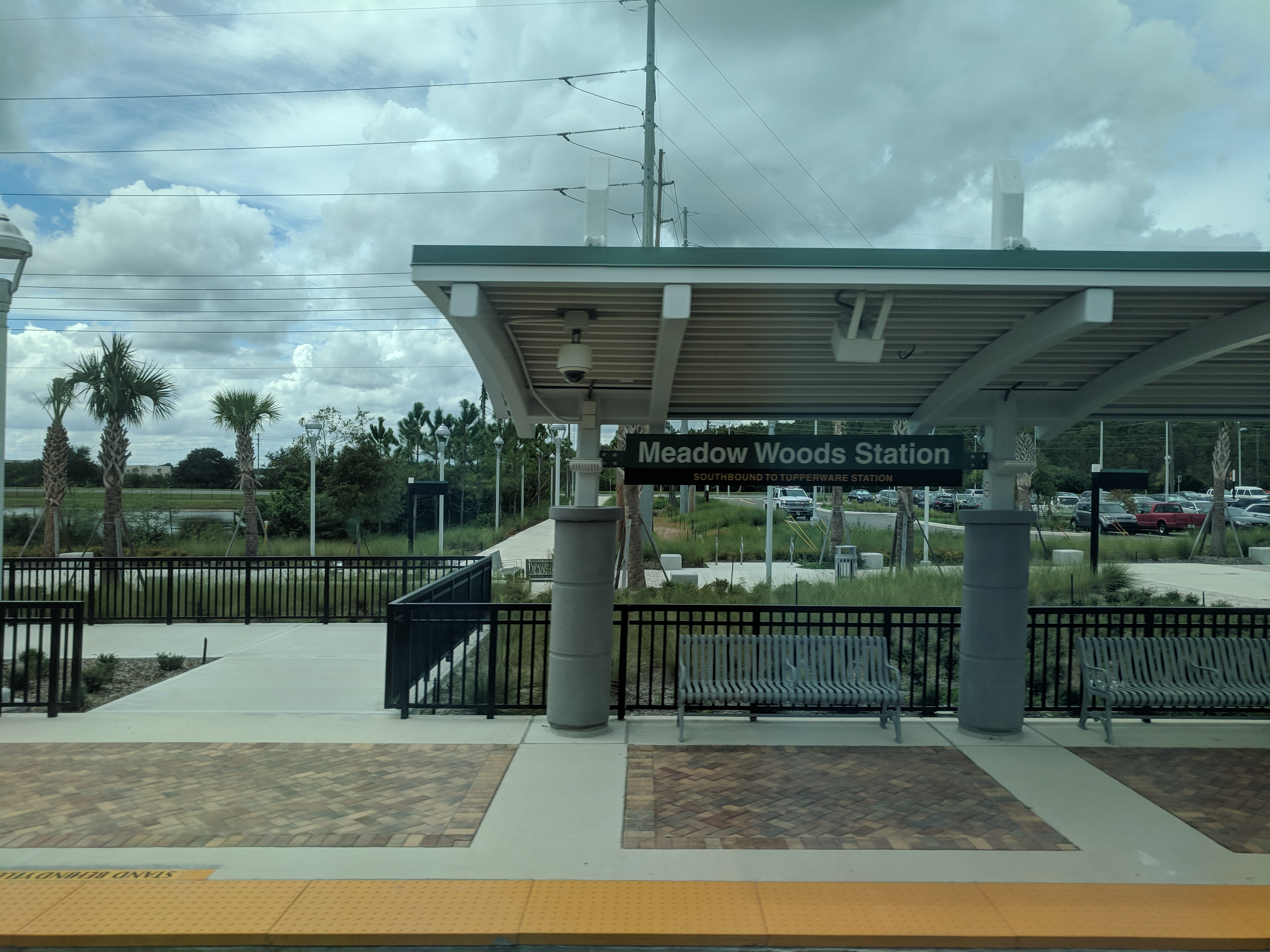
- Meadow Woods station platform

General information
- Location: 120 Fairway Woods Boulevard; Meadow Woods, Florida
- Coordinates: 28.386363°N 81.373915°W
- Platforms: 2 side platforms
- Tracks: 2
- Connections: : 18, FastLink 418

Construction
- Parking: 305 spaces
- Cycle facilities: Yes

Other information
- Fare zone: Orange

History
- Opened: July 30, 2018

Passengers
- FY 2026: 84,236 ▲0.4%

Services
Preceding station	SunRail	Following station
Tupperware toward Poinciana	SunRail	Sand Lake Road toward DeLand
Location

Meadow Woods station is a train station in the community of Meadow Woods, Florida. It is located along the southern phase of SunRail, the commuter rail service of Greater Orlando. The station is named after the community where it is located, but also serves the Southchase community.

The station held a train tour with an open house on June 23, 2018, and revenue service commenced on 30 July 2018.

The station has been proposed to be one of the two Orlando-area stops for Brightline's prospective service from Orlando to Tampa, along with the South Airport Intermodal Terminal located at Orlando International Airport.
