= Kissimmee station =

Passenger train station in Kissimmee, Florida

Kissimmee
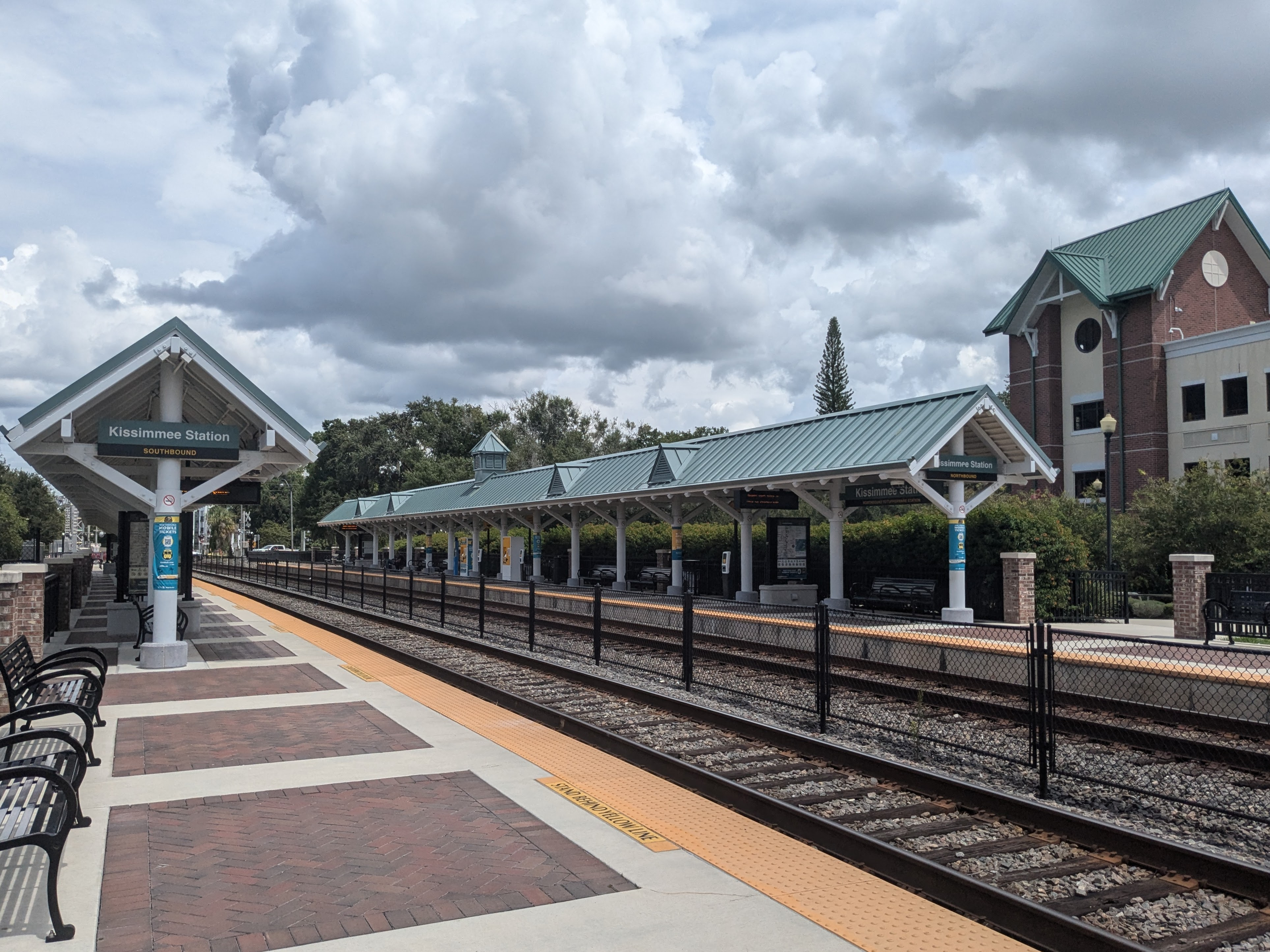
- Kissimmee station in 2024

General information
- Location: 111 East Dakin Avenue; Kissimmee, Florida; United States
- Coordinates: 28.293838°N 81.404271°W
- Owner: CSX Transportation
- Platforms: 2 side platforms
- Tracks: 2
- Connections: Lynx: 10, 18, 26, 55, 56, 57, 108, FastLink 407, FastLink 441

Construction
- Parking: Yes

Other information
- Station code: Amtrak: KIS
- Fare zone: Osceola (SunRail)

History
- Opened: 1883 (SFR)
- Rebuilt: 1910 (ACL), December 11, 1975, July 30, 2018 (SunRail)

Passengers
- FY 2025: 35,007 (Amtrak)
- FY 2026: 118,327 ▲8.3% (SunRail)

Services
Preceding station	Amtrak	Following station
Lakeland toward Miami	Floridian	Orlando toward Chicago
Winter Haven toward Miami	Silver Meteor	Orlando toward New York
Preceding station	SunRail	Following station
Poinciana Terminus	SunRail	Tupperware toward DeLand
Former services
Preceding station	Amtrak	Following station
Orlando toward Los Angeles	Sunset Limited 1993-1996	Winter Haven toward Miami
Lakeland toward St. Petersburg	Floridian	Orlando toward Chicago
Lakeland toward Miami	Silver Star	Orlando toward New York
Preceding station	Atlantic Coast Line Railroad	Following station
Campbell toward Tampa	Main Line	Meadow Woods toward Richmond
Vineland toward Apopka	Florida Midland Branch	Terminus
Terminus	Kissimmee – St. Cloud	Peghorn toward St. Cloud
Location

Kissimmee station is a train station in Kissimmee, Florida. It is served by SunRail commuter rail service and two Amtrak intercity routes (Floridian and Silver Meteor). The station opened in 1883, and has served several different railroads. It is the closest Amtrak station to Walt Disney World.

As of 2026, the station had 118,327 SunRail riders in the most recent fiscal year. It is the most-ridden SunRail station in Osceola County and the third-most-ridden SunRail station overall.

== History ==
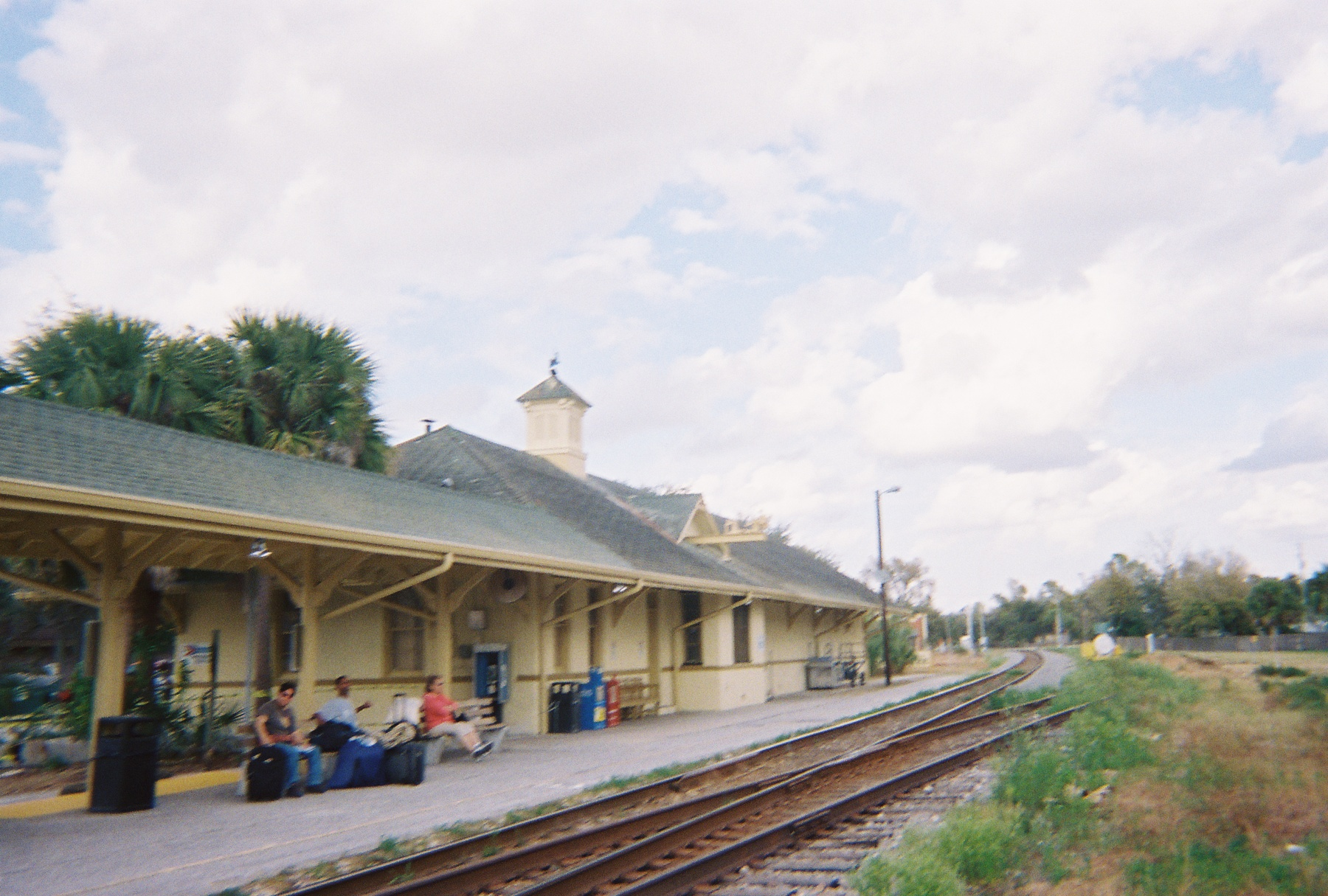
Kissimmee station in 2009

Kissimmee station was originally built as a South Florida Railroad depot in 1883, and was also a junction for the St. Cloud and Sugar Belt Railway and the original Florida Midland Railroad, all three of which were eventually acquired by the Atlantic Coast Line Railroad. It was replaced by an Atlantic Coast Line Depot in 1910, which is the building that remains to this day. The station was restored in 1976, but suffered some damage to the canopy during the 2004 Atlantic hurricane season that was repaired within two years. Sometime prior to 1990, it also contained a separate Railway Express Agency building, that was previously the site of the original South Florida Railroad depot.

Kissimmee was part of Phase 2 expansion of the SunRail commuter rail system, opened on July 30, 2018. To accommodate this new service, the station underwent numerous upgrades, including the addition of a 381 space park and ride garage, a bus drop off area, and the addition of a second track and two raised side platforms northeast of the existing ground level platform.

On November 10, 2024, Amtrak merged the Silver Star with the Capitol Limited as the Floridian.
