= Pinecastle =

Pinecastle or Pine Castle may refer to:

- McCoy Air Force Base (previously Pinecastle Army Airfield), a former United States Air Force base
- Naval Air Station DeLand (previously Pinecastle Electronic Warfare and Bombing Range), a United States Naval Air Station located in DeLand, Florida from 1942–1946
- Pine Castle, Florida, a census-designated place and unincorporated area in Orange County, Florida, United States
- Pinecastle Records, an American record label which specializes in bluegrass music
