= Maitland station =

Commuter rail station in Maitland, Florida

Maitland
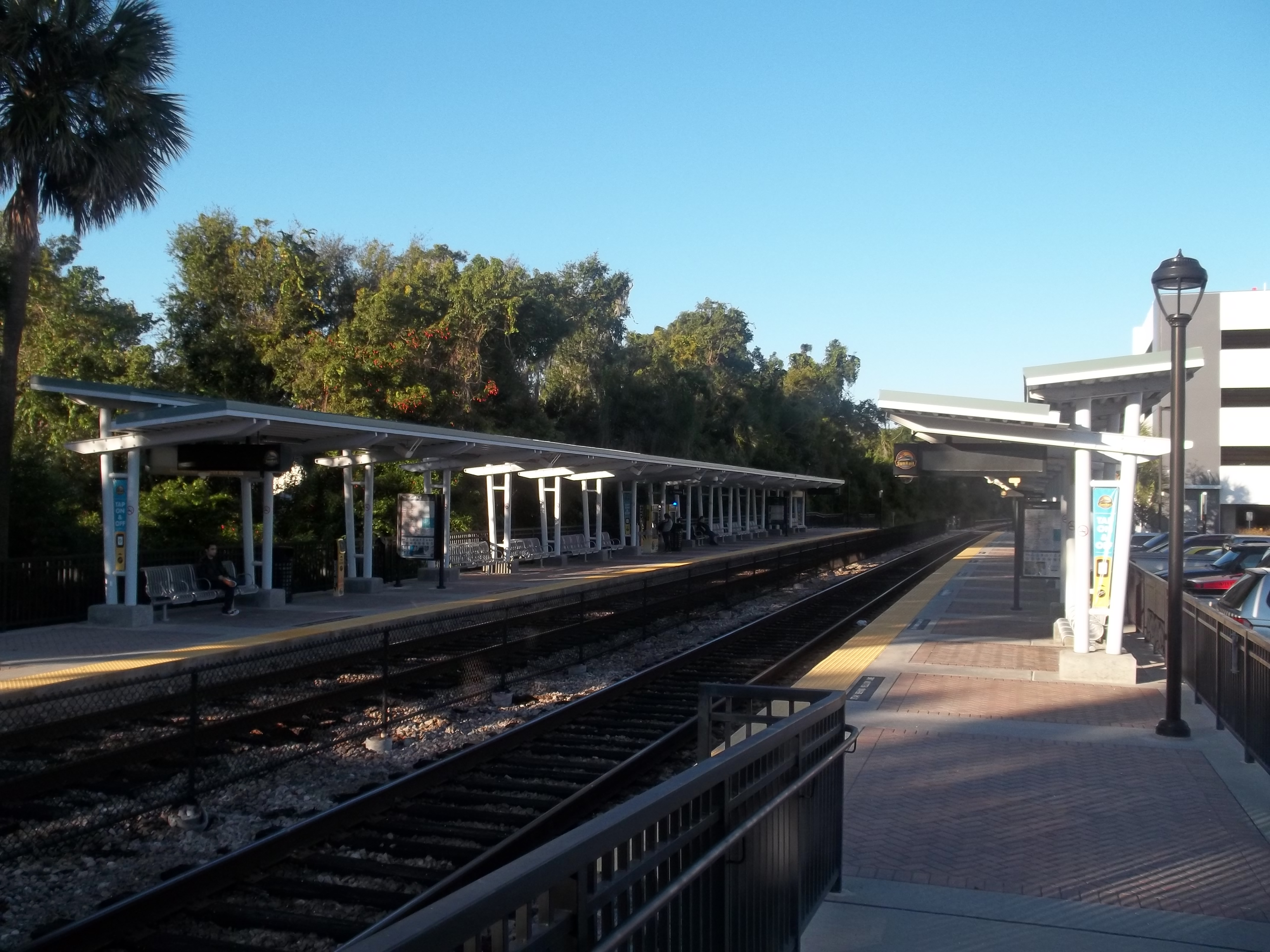
- Maitland station platforms

General information
- Location: 801 North Orlando Avenue; Maitland, Florida
- Coordinates: 28°38′05″N 81°21′44″W
- Owner: Florida Department of Transportation
- Platforms: 2 side platforms
- Tracks: 2
- Connections: Lynx: 102; NeighborLink: 852

Construction
- Structure type: At-grade
- Parking: 125 spaces
- Cycle facilities: Yes

Other information
- Fare zone: Orange

History
- Opened: April 11, 2014

Passengers
- FY2026: 36,148 ▲1.5%

Services
Preceding station	SunRail	Following station
Winter Park toward Poinciana	SunRail	Altamonte Springs toward DeLand
Location

Maitland station is a SunRail commuter rail station in Maitland, Florida. The station is located on the west side of Orlando Avenue (US 17/92) along the former CSX A-Line. It is 1/4 mile (0.40 km) south of Maitland Boulevard (SR 414) and 1/2 mile (0.80 km) north of Maitland's downtown district, City Centre. It is the northernmost SunRail station in Orange County.

A transit-oriented development building, The Parker at Maitland Station, is adjacent to the station and features a five-story, 293-unit luxury apartment community.

As of 2026, the station has the lowest ridership of all SunRail stations, with 36,148 riders in the most recent fiscal year.

== History ==
=== Predecessor ===
Rail service to Maitland was first provided by the South Florida Railroad, which was built in 1880 and ran from Sanford to Orlando. The tracks were purchased by the Atlantic Coast Line Railroad in 1902, where they became a segment of what is now known as the CSX A-Line. A depot building was constructed in 1883 near Lake Lily (approximately 1 mi (1.6 km) south of the modern station), but the structure was torn down in 1969 following tornado damage.

=== Current station ===
In 2007, the Florida Department of Transportation (FDOT) and Maitland City Council selected a station site in place of a local lumberyard, Parker Lumber. This was the only location in city limits which met FDOT's design guidelines, which required 1,000 ft (300 m) of straight track for station platforms. In 2011, this restriction was reduced to 800 ft (240 m), and Maitland proposed a different site at First Presbyterian Church of Maitland, which was closer to Maitland's downtown district. However, it would require substantial changes to SunRail's federal grant application, which would result in delays to the project. The proposal was rejected, and FDOT purchased Parker Lumber at the end of the year.

An opening ceremony was held for Maitland station on April 11, 2014, with SunRail service starting on May 1.

In 2015, the City of Maitland constructed a pedestrian boardwalk to Greenwood Gardens, a neighborhood adjacent to the station, in an effort to help boost ridership. The city also made plans to build a parking garage at the station and approved the construction of an apartment complex.

==== Shuttle to Maitland Center ====
While SunRail was being planned, four cities along its route (Maitland, Altamonte Springs, Casselberry, and Longwood) announced plans for FlexBus, an on-demand shuttle that would connect SunRail stations to locations away from the route. The service would be operated by Lynx, the region's public transit agency. Maitland's route would connect its station to Maitland Center, an office park 3 miles (4.8 km) west of the station.

In late 2014, following developmental delays and funding issues with FlexBus, Lynx opted to establish a traditional shuttle between the station and Maitland Center, which traveled between the two locations six times per day. This shuttle is still in operation as NeighborLink 852.

FlexBus development continued until 2016, when the participating cities opted to cancel the project in favor of a partnership with Uber. The partnership offered SunRail riders a 25% discount on rides between the station and any location in Maitland, including the office park. The partnership ended in July 2018.
