= SunRail =

Commuter rail system in the Greater Orlando, Florida, area

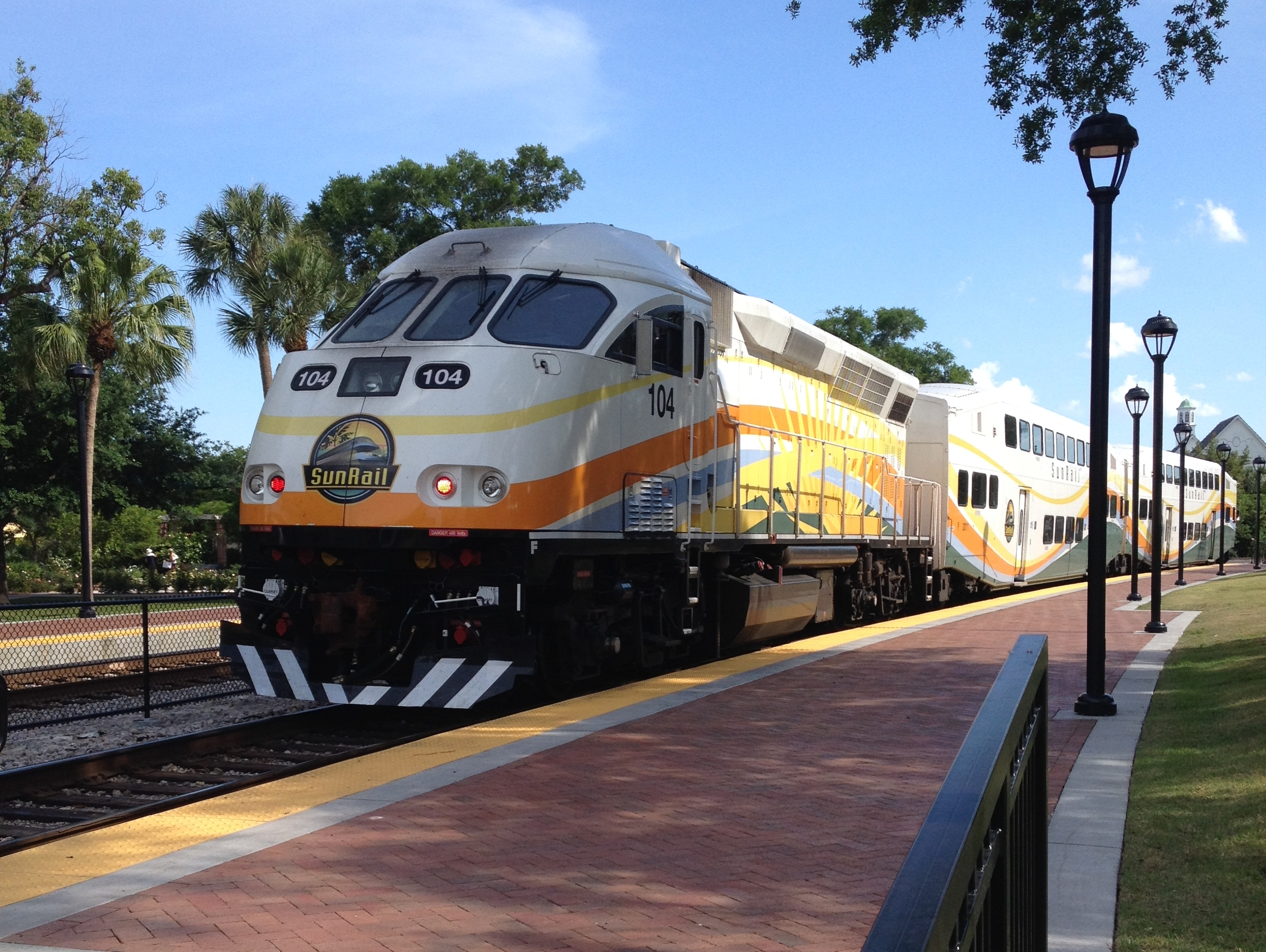
- A southbound SunRail train leaving Winter Park station

Overview
- Owner: Central Florida Commuter Rail Commission (Florida Department of Transportation)
- Locale: Greater Orlando
- Transit type: Commuter rail
- Number of lines: 1
- Number of stations: 17
- Daily ridership: 5,600 (weekdays, Q2 2026)
- Annual ridership: 1,322,500 (2025)
- Headquarters: Sanford, Florida
- Website: sunrail.com

Operation
- Began operation: May 1, 2014
- Operator: Alstom
- Reporting marks: CFRC

Technical
- System length: 61.3 mi (98.7 km)
- Track gauge: 4 ft 8 1/2 in (1,435 mm) standard gauge
- Average speed: ~30 mph (48 km/h)
- Top speed: 79 mph (127 km/h)

SunRail (reporting mark CFRC) is a commuter rail system in the Greater Orlando, Florida, area. Services began on May 1, 2014. The system comprises 17 stations along a former CSX Transportation line connecting Volusia County and Osceola County through Downtown Orlando. The SunRail system is financed by the state and federal governments and the counties it serves. SunRail is Florida's second commuter rail system after South Florida's Tri-Rail.

A southern extension to Poinciana via Kissimmee, with four additional stations, opened on July 30, 2018. On August 12, 2024, SunRail started a new service to DeLand as part of the northern extension.

In 2025, the line had a ridership of 1,322,500, or about 5,600 per weekday as of the second quarter of 2026.

== History ==
=== Cost and funding ===
The total cost of the system was originally estimated at $615 million for construction plus $432 million to purchase the right of way and tracks. However, the cost of construction ended up being above the $615 million quoted, and the agreement still allows CSX to run a limited number of freight trains along the line at night, although the majority of the freight traffic has been rerouted west to CSX's "S" Line.

The budgeted operating costs were $47 million, and the rider fare revenue is $2 million, resulting in an operating deficit of approximately $45 million, or over $50 per passenger.

Volusia, Seminole, Orange and Osceola counties and the City of Orlando partnered to build the project. The project was financed by the federal government, the state of Florida, and the local partners. Fifty percent of the funding came from a federal transit "New Starts" grant. The local partners were responsible for 25 percent of the cost and another 25 percent was paid by the State of Florida, which included the cost of track improvements, construction of train stations, and purchasing of locomotives and rail cars.

On December 22, 2010, it was announced that the state of Florida had created an escrow account with $173 million. The money was planned to be used to purchase the tracks SunRail operates on, and also allowed the state to formally request $300 million from the federal government to cover construction costs.

During its first year of operation, SunRail made a total of $7.2 million from a combination of fares, advertising and fees paid by CSX and Amtrak to run their trains through the corridor. However, SunRail spent a total of $34.4 million during that same year, ending it with a $27.2 million deficit and an average daily ridership of 3,700 passengers.

=== Project planning and approvals ===
At the end of July 2007, Orange County, Seminole County, Osceola County, Volusia County and the city of Orlando all voted on and approved the Sunrail project. Osceola County had agreed in principle, but was still examining how to fund its $9.3 million share at the time.

An agreement was reached between Florida Department of Transportation and CSX for the purchase of the tracks on November 29, 2007, and the Florida Legislature approved the CSX-Florida Department of Transportation agreement in order for project construction to begin. However, the legislature failed to vote on the agreement to purchase the right of way and tracks from CSX in the 2008 session. At issue were provisions regarding liability and indemnification. Commenting on the bill, state senator Paula Dockery said, "I don't envision a time anytime soon where thoughtful senators are going to say that there's some kind of good public policy involved in taking liability away from somebody who was at fault and putting it on the taxpayers of the state of Florida."

The contract between CSX and Florida DOT was in place through June 30, 2009, and the legislature planned to use another opportunity to consider and approve the agreement in the 2009 legislative session. The bill made it through all necessary Senate committee approvals and the first segment of the project had already been approved to enter Final Design by the Federal Transit Administration on August 11, 2008.

On January 14, 2009, the SunRail name and logo were presented to the public by Orlando mayor Buddy Dyer. Progress continued to move slowly forward on the project until the state legislative session on April 30, 2009, when the project was once again defeated by a 23–17 vote. The movement against the project, which was once again led by state senators Paula Dockery and Mike, continued to revolve around an amendment that would have approved a $200 million insurance policy for SunRail. Another political problem for SunRail was an overall lack of support for the project from the South Florida delegation (which included state senators Chris Smith of Fort Lauderdale, Dan Gelber of Miami Beach, Nan Rich of Weston and Frederica Wilson of Miami) effectively killed the bill.

After the second failure, with the deadline to purchase the tracks in question from CSX looming, the state initially pulled the plan from the legislative agenda, endangering as much as $307 million in federal funds that had been promised to SunRail, which would have been taken away if the plan failed. Nearly $27 million of that federal money had already been spent to purchase rail equipment and land for stations and it was unknown whether or not the state of Florida would have had to pay the money back to the federal government. However, CSX rescinded the deadline on June 29, permitting more negotiation time for insurance arrangements. An agreement on insurance was finally reached, and lawmakers convened a special session in December 2009 that passed the House on December 7 and the Senate on December 8. Additional federal money may be attracted to reduce the financial cost to the state.

On December 8, 2009, the contractual requirement necessary to move forward with SunRail was passed along with funding for South Florida's Tri-Rail system. At the bill's signing Senate President Jeff Atwater said "Today, Florida is embracing the opportunity to lead the nation in developing a comprehensive transportation system, thereby ensuring our competitive edge in the 21st Century global economy. A comprehensive transportation system, creating opportunities and avenues to connect employers and employees, is integral to building a stronger future for Florida."

Negotiations with Amtrak subsequently led to a dispute over which party would bear liability for incidents on Amtrak trains operating on the route, which would be owned by SunRail—Amtrak wanted SunRail to assume responsibility for such incidents, while SunRail wanted Amtrak to be liable. The purchase of the trackage from CSX could not be completed until an agreement with Amtrak was reached. On December 10, 2010, it was announced that Amtrak and the state had apparently reached a deal regarding the issue, as Amtrak had dropped its opposition to the sale.

On January 29, 2011, Florida governor Rick Scott froze all SunRail contracts and ordered a six-month legislative review of the project to determine whether the project was a good investment. However, on July 1, 2011, Florida Department of Transportation secretary Ananth Prasad announced that Scott had finally approved the project.

=== Construction ===
The Phase 1 construction contract was awarded to two primary general contractors; RailWorks Track Systems, Inc. of New York City, who would be responsible for right-of-way and track improvements, and Atlanta-based Archer Western Contractors Ltd., who would be responsible for building the stations. Work would include double tracking the existing line; the installation of new wayside signals; improvements to existing grade crossings; construction of the station platforms, canopies and adjacent parking areas; as well as building of the Operations Control Center and Vehicle Storage & Maintenance Facility at CSX's Rand Yard in Sanford.

Ground was broken at the future Altamonte Springs station site on January 27, 2012, marking the official beginning of construction for Phase 1 of the SunRail project. The first load of steel rail for double tracking the route between Sanford and Longwood was delivered not long after in early 2012. A second set of rails for double tracking the route between North Street in Longwood and Gore Street south of Downtown Orlando was delivered at the end of March 2012, and a third set, which supplemented various locations between Sanford and Orlando, was delivered at the end of July 2012. The sections of standard 115-pounds-per-yard rail were 1,650 feet (500 m) long, weighing 31 tons each. On September 28, 2012, the St. Johns River drawbridge in Sanford was closed for 54 hours while construction crews demolished and replaced the bridge approach spans. By the time Phase 1 construction was completed in early 2014, nearly 32 miles (51 km) of main line single track were double-tracked, three existing CSX freight yards were reconfigured, wayside signal and grade crossing signal improvements were made along the corridor, a total of 12 stations were built, and a new Operations Control Center and Vehicle Storage & Maintenance Facility were constructed.

=== Operational history ===
SunRail curtailed late night train service on December 21, 2015 citing ridership. A mid-day train to service leisure riders was introduced.

SunRail has tested a few Saturday train operations. The test was from November 2016 to January 2017 but it did not happen every Saturday. Train service has been run on a Saturday after the supposed end date of January with the latest being on March 18. This day set a ridership record with 12,842 passengers and is attributed to several events running in Orlando, specifically the Winter Park Sidewalk Arts Festival and an Orlando City Soccer Club soccer match. This headcount far outpaces the daily weekday ridership record of 8,842. Several major businesses including the Downtown Orlando Partnership and Downtown Development Board are donating funds to pay for Saturday service. It's estimated the cost is $20,000+ each Saturday. Each company involved gives money towards the operating expenses in exchange for on-train advertising, logo placement on stations and billboards, and social media promotions. Weekend trains will run between afternoon and evenings and are adjusted to serve specific events. The cost of running trains on Saturday is about $20,000. This service was to start in November 5.

=== Phase 2 South ===
This segment extended the system 17 miles (27 km) south from Sand Lake Road into Osceola County with a stop at the existing Kissimmee station as well as new stations being built in Meadow Woods, Hunter's Creek and Poinciana. Because federal funding in the amount of $93 million was secured for Phase 2 South, construction on this segment began first.

On August 14, 2015, the state of Florida received the full funding grant agreement from the Federal Transit Administration that moved forward completion of SunRail Phase 2 South. Congressman John Mica stated that because of the expedited agreement, full funding for the additional 17 miles (27 km) extension was expected to be approved by the end of September. On September 28, 2015, the $93 million grant was formally approved at a ceremony at the Kissimmee Amtrak station. With matching state and local funding already in place providing an additional $93 million, construction on Phase 2 South was expected to begin in December 2015, but the Florida Department of Transportation delayed the selection of a design/build team until October 26, 2015, thus pushing back the start date by approximately a month.

Despite the delay in starting construction on Phase 2 South, the city of Kissimmee broke ground at the end of October 2015 on a parking structure next to the proposed Kissimmee SunRail Station and existing Multimodal Center, which, at the time, was used by the Lynx and Greyhound bus services. The parking structure was officially opened on May 10, 2017, and is four stories tall, accommodates 398 cars, offers EV charging stations and LED lighting that dims when the garage is empty, and offers parking gratis. The cost was $9 million. It was also announced that Tupperware Brands Corporation added an extra $120,000 for upgrades to the Hunter's Creek station, which will be built on land near their headquarters. This was done in exchange for naming rights to the station, which is now called the Tupperware Station. This funding will be used for additional landscaping and lighting along with cosmetic upgrades to the station design so that it will mimic the Tupperware headquarters building.

Congressman John Mica announced on November 25, 2015, that $63 million in federal dollars were on the way to assist the completion of Phase 2 South. On March 28, 2016, the Florida Department of Transportation gave notice that Phase 2 South construction would begin on April 1, 2016, with service expected to begin by February 2018. A construction commencement ceremony took place on April 25, 2016, at 10:00 am at the site of the future Tupperware station, which officially kicked off construction.

The Dana B. Kenyon Company of Jacksonville, Florida was awarded the $31.7 million contract for the Phase 2 southern extension project, including construction at each of the four new stations and new vehicle storage and maintenance facilities.

Train testing on the southern extension began in February 2018 and revenue service was inaugurated on July 30.

=== Phase 2 North ===
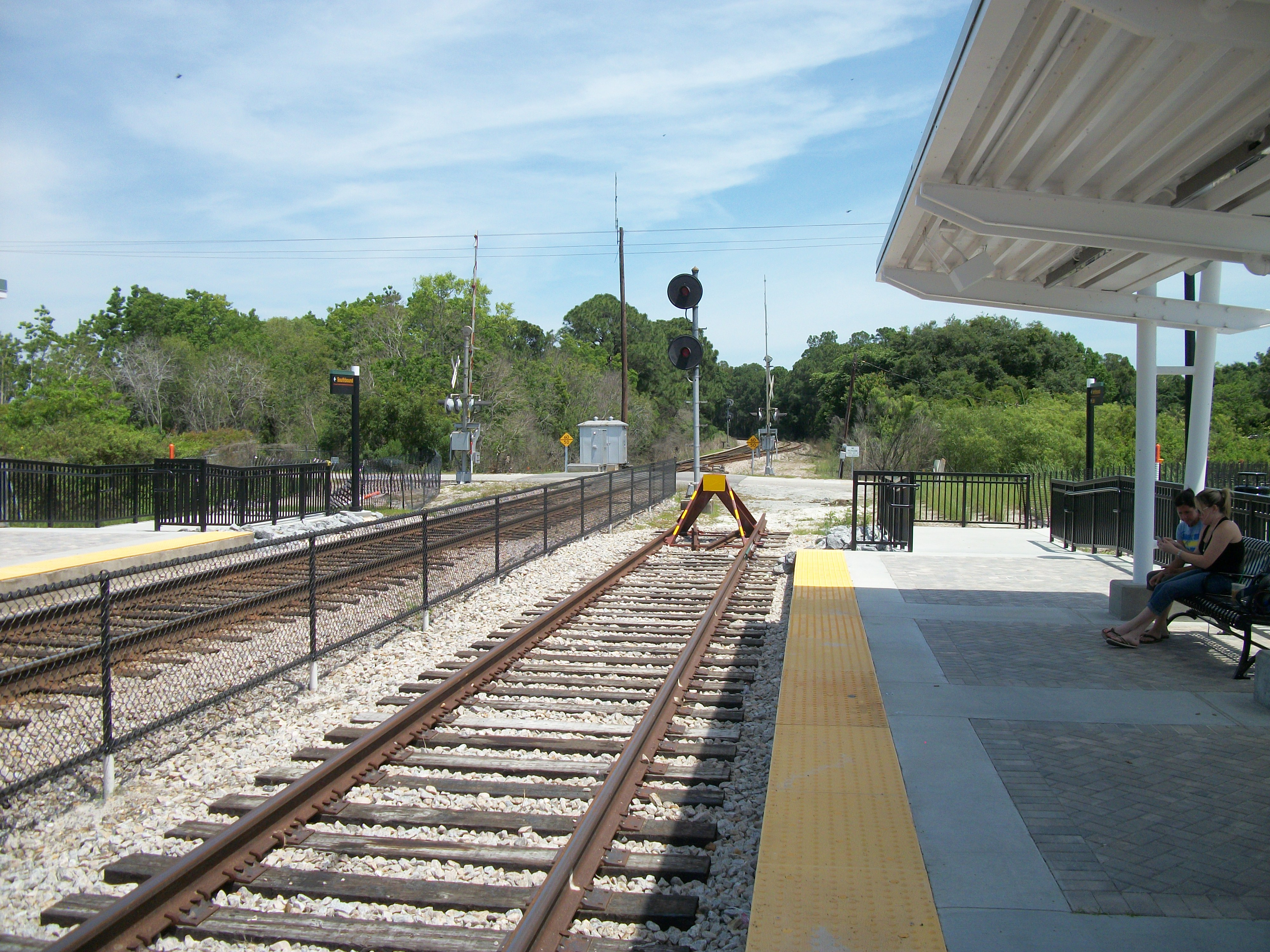
Looking north from the DeBary station in May 2014; SunRail was extended north to DeLand from here in the Summer of 2024.

Phase 2 North extended the system 13 miles (21 km) north from DeBary to the previously existing DeLand Amtrak station.

However, on October 29, 2015, SunRail officials were denied a $35 million federal grant for the 13 mile Phase 2 North extension to Deland in Volusia County due to low ridership projections. County and SunRail officials were counting on this money to help pay for half of the $70 million cost to build this extension. In wake of not receiving federal funding, an additional station in Orange City was briefly considered to boost ridership projections along the Phase 2 North extension.

In early 2021, the Florida Department of Transportation announced they had received $34 million in federal funding for the extension to DeLand with the rest to be paid for by local governments. As part of the extension, FDOT is currently considering whether to expand only a portion of the track to double track to save money. A groundbreaking ceremony was held on May 22, 2023, with the extension opening on August 12, 2024.

== Service ==
=== Route ===
The route is made up of the following stations, from north to south:

County/Fare zone	Town	Station	Phase	Connections
Volusia	DeLand	DeLand	2 North	Amtrak: Floridian, Silver Meteor; Votran: 34, VoRide
Volusia	DeBary	DeBary	1	Votran: 31, 33, VoRide
Seminole	Sanford	Sanford	1	Scout: Monroe zone
Seminole	Lake Mary	Lake Mary	1	Scout: Lake Mary zone
Seminole	Longwood	Longwood	1	Scout: Howell zone
Seminole	Altamonte Springs	Altamonte Springs	1	Lynx: 102, 436N, 436S; Scout: Brantley zone
Orange	Maitland	Maitland	1	Lynx: 102, NeighborLink 852
Orange	Winter Park	Winter Park	1	Amtrak: Floridian, Silver Meteor; Lynx: 1, 9, 23, 43, 102
Orange	Orlando	AdventHealth	1	Lynx: 102, 125
Orange	Orlando	Lynx Central Station	1	Lynx: 3, 7, 8, 11, 13, 15, 18, 19, 20, 21, 25, 28, 29, 36, 38, 40, 48, 49, 51, 54, 102, 104, 105, 106, 107, 125, 300, 350, FastLink 441; Lymmo: Orange Line, Lime Line
Orange	Orlando	Church Street Station	1	Lymmo: Orange Line, Grapefruit Line
Orange	Orlando	Orlando Health/Amtrak	1	Amtrak: Floridian, Silver Meteor; Amtrak Thruway: St. Petersburg/Fort Myers; Lynx: 40
Orange	Pine Castle	Sand Lake Road	1	Lynx: 11, 18, 42, 311
Orange	Meadow Woods	Meadow Woods	2 South	Lynx: 18, FastLink 418
Osceola	Hunter's Creek	Tupperware	2 South	Lynx: 18, NeighborLink 831
Osceola	Kissimmee	Kissimmee	2 South	Amtrak: Floridian, Silver Meteor; Lynx: 10, 18, 26, 55, 56, 57, 108, FastLink 407, FastLink 441, Neighborlink 831
Osceola	Poinciana	Poinciana	2 South	Lynx: 306, NeighborLink 804; Citrus Connection: 19X

Future stations

County/Fare zone	Town	Station	Phase	Connections	Notes
Orange	Orlando	Orlando International Airport	3	Brightline; Terminal Link to Orlando International Airport; Lynx: 11, 42, 51, 111, 436S, FastLink 407	

=== Schedule ===
SunRail runs on weekdays (excluding holidays) between the hours of approximately 5:00 am and 11:00 pm, providing 20 trips in each direction.

== Fare system and ticketing ==
Riders on the SunRail system use a stored-value card, in the form of a disposable ticket or a reloadable SunCard, to pay fares. The cost of SunRail tickets is based on the number of counties (zones) through which the rider will be travelling. The system passes through four counties: Volusia, Seminole, Orange, and Osceola. SunRail uses a "tap on/tap off" system for ticketing. Riders must "tap on" at a validator unit at the station prior to boarding the train by tapping their ticket on the screen and waiting for the beep. Riders must again "tap off" at a validator unit with their ticket after disembarking at their destination before exiting the station. Reduced fares are available for seniors, students, and disabled riders. Costs are determined by the number of zones a rider travels, trip type, and rider type. There is an initial cost of $2.00 to ride SunRail within one zone. When a rider crosses into another zone, there is an additional $1.00 increase per county. Fares for passes are based on how many zones (counties) you travel through.

Plans for a mobile ticketing app were announced in May 2019. Development was expected to cost $200,000.

== Technical ==
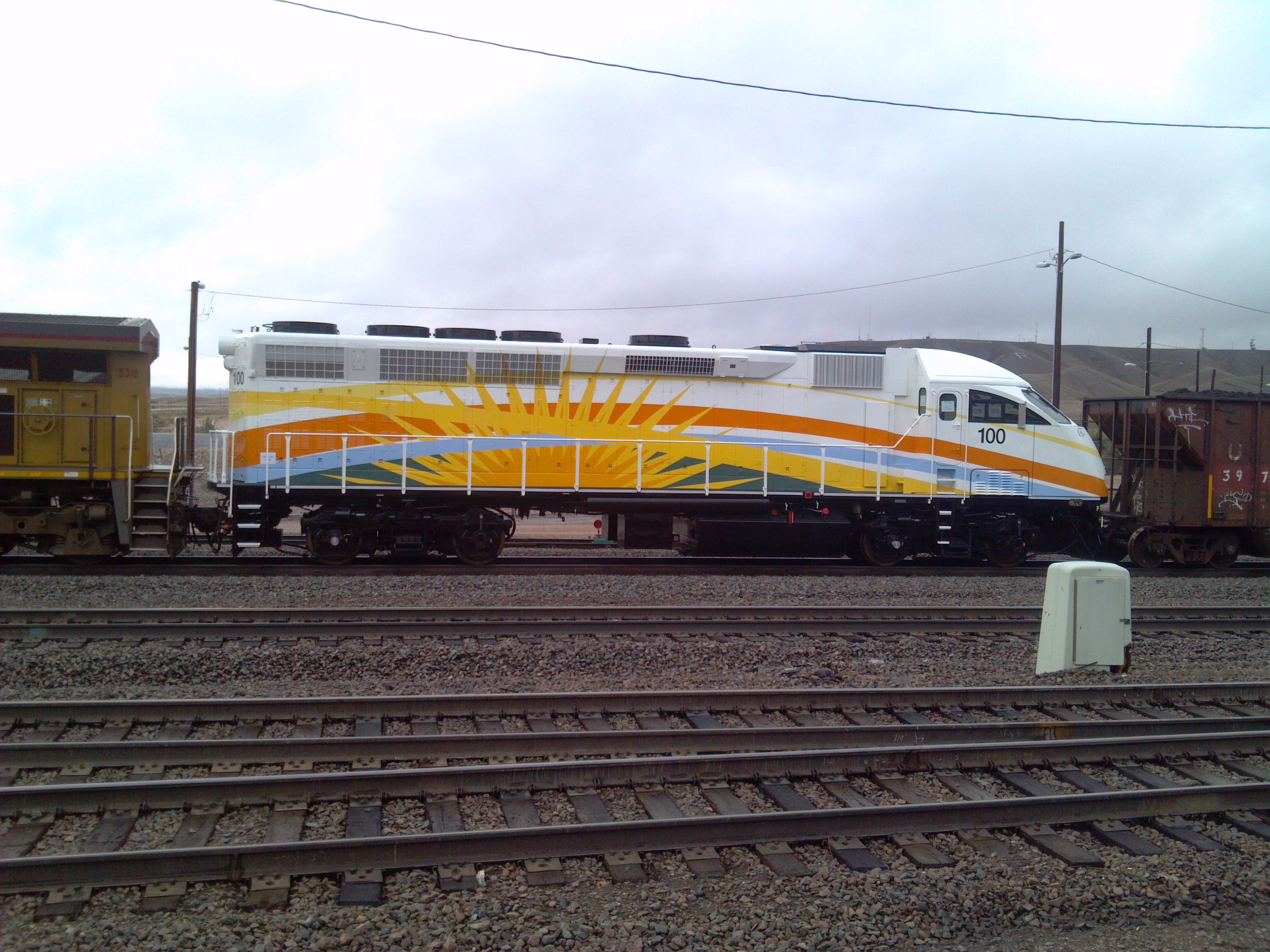
An MPI MP32PH-Q locomotive in SunRail livery in September 2013.

=== Operations and maintenance ===
In addition to SunRail commuter trains, the line is used by three daily round trip Amtrak trains (the Silver Meteor, Silver Star/Floridian, and Auto Train), as well as by a handful of CSX freight trains. SunRail connects directly with the Silver Meteor and Silver Star/Floridian in Winter Park, Orlando, Kissimmee and DeLand and the Sanford SunRail station is a five-minute drive from the Sanford Auto Train station.

The line was also used by Amtrak's tri-weekly Sunset Limited which ran between Orlando and Los Angeles. However, service has been suspended indefinitely between Orlando and New Orleans since 2005 due to damage caused to the line by Hurricane Katrina.

The Florida Department of Transportation announced on April 16, 2013, that it had awarded Bombardier Technology a 10-year, $195 million contract to provide operation and maintenance services for SunRail, which includes train operations, dispatching, track and equipment maintenance, customer service, station platform & facility maintenance, and materials supply. Bombardier assumed the operations and maintenance responsibilities in the spring of 2014. Alstom acquired Bombardier in 2021.

On Monday, July 29, 2013, at 3:30 am, the Florida Department of Transportation assumed all train dispatching duties along the SunRail corridor from CSX. This event officially marked the end of CSX's involvement with the operations of the line, transferring total operational control of the corridor to the state of Florida. Since the hand off from CSX, all train dispatching has been handled by the CFRC Dispatcher out of the Operations Control Center at Rand Yard in Sanford, Florida.

Operational testing of the SunRail equipment began on October 26, 2013, along the corridor between the DeBary and Maitland stations. The test train, which consisted of a locomotive and two cab cars, was part of a 2,500-mile (4,000 km) "burn-in" period that is required prior to the start of revenue service. Over 100 similar test runs took place over the following months to ensure that the new trains, wayside signals and grade crossing signals operated correctly, as well as to verify that the trains properly aligned with each station platform.

On Friday, January 31, 2014, the Florida Department of Transportation announced that SunRail would begin service on May 1, 2014. SunRail initially offered a series of free test runs in April, but canceled them and instead decided to open for free for the first two weeks of service in May. This enabled remaining work to be completed in time. SunRail warned passengers who already purchased fare cards not to use their fare cards during the free run, or they may be deducted fares.

The SunRail grand opening was held at the Sand Lake Station at 11:00 am EDT on Wednesday, April 30, 2014. This was preceded by a series of openings at the other stations, starting at the DeBary Station at 8:15 am EDT, and progressing south down the line through the other stations at 15-minute intervals. Passenger operations officially commenced on Thursday, May 1, 2014, with the first revenue service train departing south out of the Sanford Station at 5:06 am EDT. Sunrail trains operate at speeds between 30 and 79 miles per hour (48 and 127 km/h), with an average speed of 33 miles per hour (53 km/h), including stops.

All SunRail operations and maintenance personnel are employees of Bombardier Transportation. Approximately 24 engineers and conductors are on the operating roster at any given time. SunRail train crews (engineers & conductors) are represented by the International Association of Sheet Metal, Air, Rail and Transportation Workers labor union (formerly known as the United Transportation Union (UTU).)

=== Rolling stock ===
In 2011 the Florida Department of Transportation ordered fourteen BiLevel coaches from Bombardier Transportation for $41 million, with an option for 46 additional cars. This order was later expanded to twenty, with the first cars arriving in Florida on July 20, 2013.

MotivePower supplied eleven MPI MP32PH-Q diesel locomotives, rebuilt from former Morrison-Knudsen GP40WH-2 locomotives which previously operated on MARC. These were ordered on September 12, 2011. The first locomotive, #100, arrived on October 1, 2013, via CSX freight train at the SunRail Operations Control Center in Sanford, Florida, from the MotivePower plant in Boise, Idaho. In December 2017, the eleventh locomotive was delivered.

Sunrail trains operate at speeds between 30 and 79 miles per hour (48 and 127 km/h), with an average speed of 33 miles per hour (53 km/h), including stops. Each passenger car is fully wheelchair accessible and equipped with a restroom, space for bicycles, electrical outlets for laptops and phone chargers, and free Wi-Fi.

Photo	Year	Make	Model	Numbers	Total	Horsepower	Weight	Seats	Notes
	2013–14	MPI	MP32PH-Q	100-110	11 units	3,200	285,000 to 295,000 lb (129,000 to 134,000 kg)	(3 crew)	Order placed on September 12, 2011.; Rebuilt from MARC GP40WH-2 locomotives.; 100 was the first unit to arrive, it was delivered on October 1, 2013, by CSX to the SunRail Operations Control Center in Sanford, FL.; 110 was the last to be built, arriving in 2017.
	2017	MPI	MP32PH-Q	100-110	11 units	3,200	285,000 to 295,000 lb (129,000 to 134,000 kg)	(3 crew)	Order placed on September 12, 2011.; Rebuilt from MARC GP40WH-2 locomotives.; 100 was the first unit to arrive, it was delivered on October 1, 2013, by CSX to the SunRail Operations Control Center in Sanford, FL.; 110 was the last to be built, arriving in 2017.
	2012–13	Bombardier	BiLevel VII	2000–2012	13 units	N/A	110,000 lb (50,000 kg)	136 (3 crew)	Order placed in 2011; First units delivered on July 20, 2013.; 14 units were initially ordered, with an option for 46 additional units, order later expanded to 20 units.; All units are wheelchair accessible and equipped with restrooms, space for bicycles, electrical outlets, and free Wi-Fi.
	2012–13	Bombardier	BiLevel cab car	3000–3006	7 units	N/A		142	
	2019	Bombardier	BiLevel IX	3007-3009	3 units	N/A		142	

=== Paint scheme ===
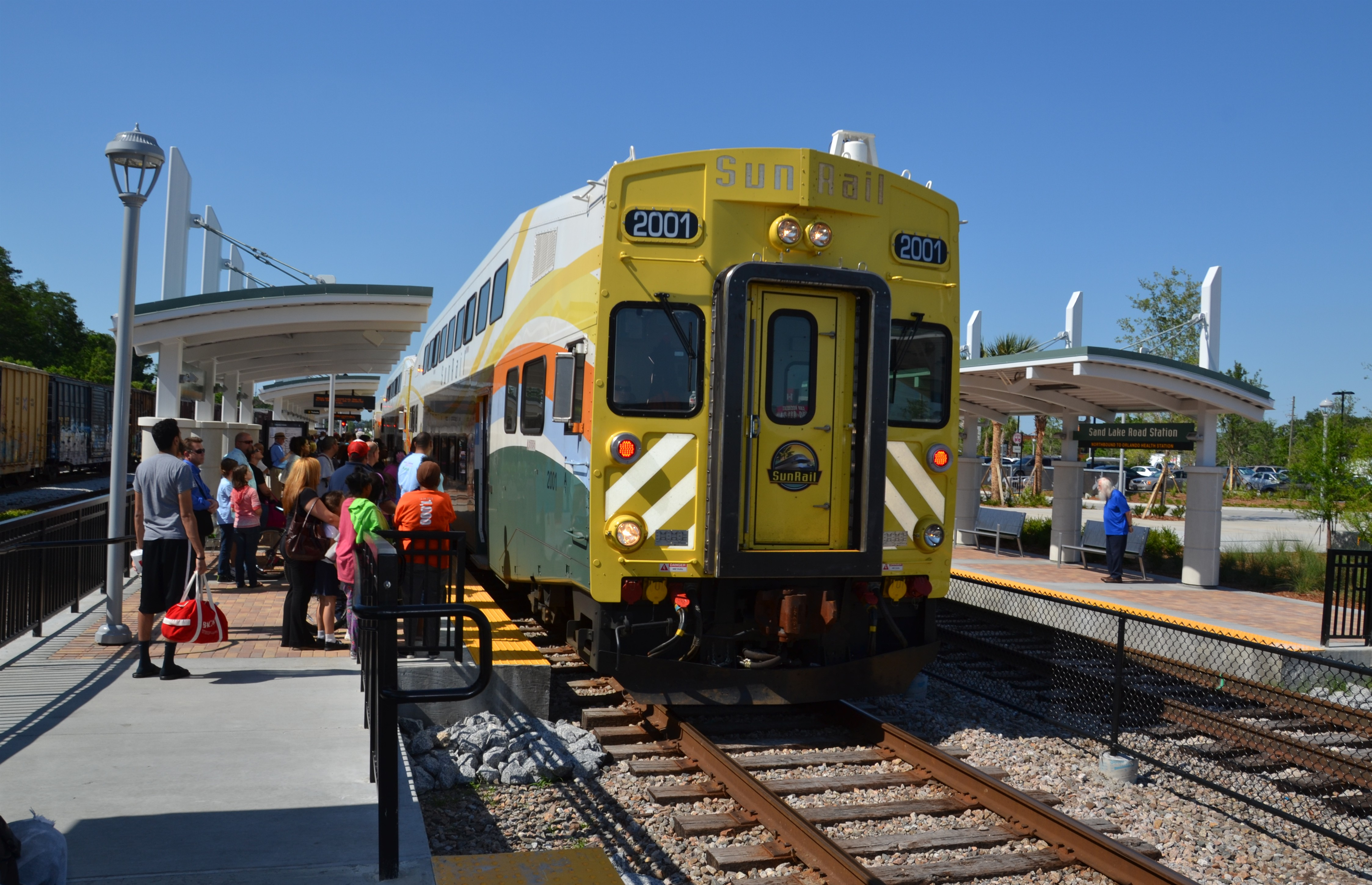

On September 10, 2010, the Central Florida Commuter Rail Commission chose a paint scheme for the trains. The design featured a sun along with renderings of green for wildlife and blue for skies. According to the designer, Jim Bockstall, the scheme was based on public input and was intended to include both movement and traditional imagery.

== Safety and security ==
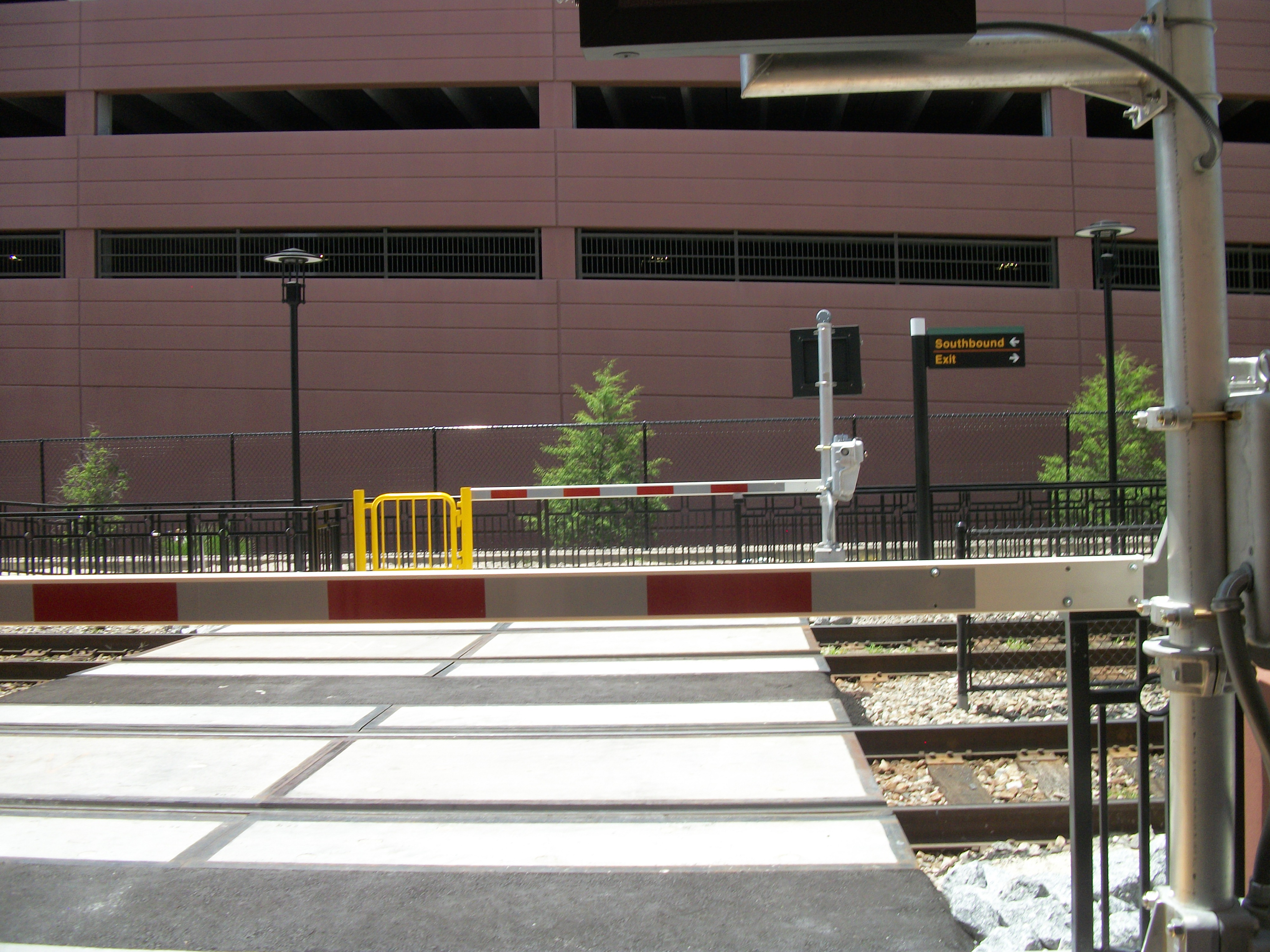
Safety features at stations include bells, gates, and LED displays

In the months leading up to SunRail going operational, the Florida Department of Transportation (FDOT) ran an aggressive public-safety campaign to warn drivers and passengers about railroad safety using pamphlets, puppet shows for children, YouTube and even a Safety Mascot Squirrel named Tie. Despite this effort, SunRail has experienced several accidents with both motorists and pedestrians. Nearly a year into service, officials began installing dial-up grade crossing systems at grade crossings that are located closest to the stations. This system allows train crews to manually activate grade crossing warning devices (i.e. crossing gates, lights and bells) from the locomotive cab via key-coded radio transmission, thus eliminating the confusion of the grade crossing warning devices automatically activating, deactivating and reactivating whenever trains approach, stop at and depart the stations.

Security on the train and at stations is the responsibility of FDOT. The FDOT does not employ a security force and relies solely on surveillance cameras and emergency call boxes. Uniformed police officers are permitted to ride SunRail free of charge.

=== Grade crossing accidents ===
Because of the flat terrain and high water table of the Orlando area, the entire route of SunRail is at grade. Most road crossings except for expressways are not grade-separated; even major arterials like Route 17/92 have level crossings in populated areas. There are 96 grade crossings along the Phase 1 route, with an additional 30 on Phase 2. SunRail dramatically increased frequencies on the line, with 34 daily trips. Six daily Amtrak trains (three round trips) continue to operate, while 20 daily freights have largely been moved to the CSX "S" Line to the west.

Within the first five months of regular operations, SunRail trains were involved in four grade crossing accidents, all caused by driver error. Florida Highway Patrol officials blamed the crashes on drivers who were too impatient to wait for trains to pass and did not understand that trains cannot stop quickly. Tri-Rail, which operates in a very similar densely populated area with many grade crossings, had 93 crashes during its first 15 years, though other systems saw their rates decrease after the initial months. After two more driver-caused accidents in early 2013, police increased enforcement of drivers bypassing crossing gates in an attempt to prevent additional crashes.

Due to an accident on October 8, 2015, where a dump truck was parked too close to the tracks and was side-swiped by a train, the Florida Highway Patrol has begun monitoring crossings and station areas. Billboards and mailers about train safety will also be put out to raise awareness.

=== Positive train control technology ===
Positive train control (PTC) is a federal government mandated technology which improves railroad safety by maintaining separation between trains and enforcing speed limits. Wabtec, a Wilmerding, Pennsylvania, company, was awarded a $62 million contract to design, install, test, and implement the safety technology on SunRail. Installation was completed during 2019, and PTC was initiated on the entire system on January 13, 2020. All trains are currently running with PTC enabled in revenue service demonstration, a form of advanced field testing. Interoperability testing has been completed with CSX, which runs freight trains on the corridor, and was scheduled for late July with Amtrak. PTC was fully implemented on December 31, 2020.

== Plans and expansions ==
SunRail divided its startup operations into two phases. Phase 1 opened on May 1, 2014, between DeBary and Sand Lake Road. Due to budgetary constraints, Phase 2 was divided into two separate segments. Phase 2 South opened on July 30, 2018, between Sand Lake Road and Poinciana. Phase 2 North opened between DeBary and DeLand on August 12, 2024.

=== Phase 3 (Orlando International Airport connection and Sunshine Corridor) ===
The Sunshine Corridor is a new east–west rail corridor under development that will run from Orlando International Airport to southwestern Orange County at a point near Walt Disney World. The Sunshine Corridor is being developed as a joint venture between SunRail, inter-city rail operator Brightline, and local businesses. The Sunshine Corridor will begin at the Orlando International Airport Intermodal Terminal, which is since September 2023 the Orlando terminus of Brightline, a privately funded Inter-city rail passenger service to South Florida (among other stations West Palm Beach, Fort Lauderdale and Miami). From the intermodal terminal, the Sunshine Corridor will run south and join the existing Orlando Utilities Commission (OUC) rail spur which runs to SunRail's main line. At the main line, a transfer station will be built to connect passengers to SunRail's existing service (which will be between Meadow Woods station and Sand Lake Road station on the main line). The Sunshine Corridor will then continue west via a new rail line along Taft-Vineland Road and State Road 528 with a station near the Orange County Convention Center, which will also serve the International Drive tourist corridor and Universal Orlando's newest Universal Epic Universe theme park. Universal Orlando plans to donate 13 acres of land for this station. From the convention center, the corridor will continue southwest along Interstate 4 with an additional station (known as International Drive South) in the vicinity of Walt Disney World.

When complete, the Sunshine Corridor would be owned by SunRail, with Brightline also leasing the corridor for its inter-city trains as part of its extension to Tampa. Brightline will build their own line from the west end of the corridor to Tampa. In June 2022, the Sunshine Corridor and Brightline's proposed extension to Tampa received a $15 million grant from the Infrastructure Investment and Jobs Act for a ridership study.

On April 9, 2024, a transportation sales tax was considered by Orange County that could have had the airport connection open in 2031, but it was not put on the ballot as it was not ready for passage. It could be brought up again in 2026.

On April 24, 2025, the Central Florida Commuter Rail Commission approved a Project Development and Environment Study, costing $6 million. The study is expected to take several years. Officials with the Florida Department of Transportation said the full project could cost upwards of $4 billion.

==== Previous proposals ====
SunRail officials had been investigating a connection to Orlando International Airport since the mid-2010s. Currently this connection requires transferring to a public Lynx bus at Sand Lake Road Station. Early proposals also used the existing Orlando Utilities Commission (OUC) rail spur, which runs along the southern boundary of the airport's property and is used exclusively by coal trains to serve the Curtis H. Stanton Energy Center in eastern Orange County. Trains would then branch off onto a new 2-mile (3.2 km) spur that would terminate at the Orlando International Airport Intermodal Terminal. Other proposals separate from SunRail were also made, including an abandoned plan for a privately-built maglev from Orlando Airport to International Drive that would have connected with SunRail.

The Orlando International Airport Intermodal Terminal opened in 2017, though track connecting it to the OUC spur was not built until 2022 by Brightline. The intermodal terminal is adjacent to the airport's new south terminal and is connected to the main airport terminal via a people mover. The Orlando International Airport Intermodal Terminal is since September 2023 the terminus of Brightline.

The cost of the Phase 3 expansion under this proposal was originally estimated at $100 million. In September 2015, SunRail officials submitted a request to the Federal Transit Administration (FTA) to move the project from the initial planning phase into the project development phase, which it approved on October 26, 2015. In April 2017, a state study of constructing trackage to the airport found that it would cost about $250 million, and with no funding sources identified the project was left with no timetable for execution.

In 2018, Brightline announced its intentions to expand west from Orlando Internarional Airport to Tampa. Brightline's initial proposed route for this expansion would exit the airport south, run west along the OUC Spur, then south along the SunRail main line with a stop at Meadow Woods station before turning west and running along the State Road 417 corridor to a station at Disney Springs. This proposal caused talks for SunRail connection to the airport to resume. In late 2020, Brightline added that they were studying the possibility of allowing SunRail to operate on their line between Disney Springs and Innovation Way with stops at Hunter's Creek, the existing Meadow Woods station, and the Orlando International Airport Intermodal Center. However, this route was opposed by Universal Orlando, whose theme parks would be bypassed under this plan which led to the development of the current Sunshine Corridor proposal. As the Sunshine Corridor was being planned, the Walt Disney Company backed out of a plan to allow a station on their property at Disney Springs. The International Drive South station was then planned as an alternative and will be located just outside of Disney property.

=== Daytona Beach extension ===
On April 17, 2014, Volusia County and FDOT funded a $2.5 million study to investigate the cost, preliminary design and ridership of a SunRail extension northeast to Daytona Beach. As part of this effort, Volusia County wants to see the Interstate 4 median width maintained as a possible future rail corridor.

=== Lakeland extension ===
The 2035 Polk County Mobility Vision Plan envisions extending SunRail west into Polk County, with stations at Haines City, Auburndale, and Lakeland. Each station would be built in separate phases. The Florida Department of Transportation released an initial plans for the extension in 2023. Service would extend south to Haines City, with a later extension the full length to Lakeland Amtrak station.

=== Sanford Airport extension ===
Seminole County officials have brought up the possibility of extending SunRail to Orlando Sanford International Airport via an existing 4-mile (6.4 km) freight spur. The Florida Department of Transportation has a contractual option to lease the spur from CSX for 30 years after 2007 for $10.

== See also ==
- Tri-Rail
- Transportation in Florida
- South Florida Railroad
- Jacksonville, Tampa and Key West Railroad
