= Pine Castle, Florida =

Unincorporated area in Florida, US

- Census-designated place
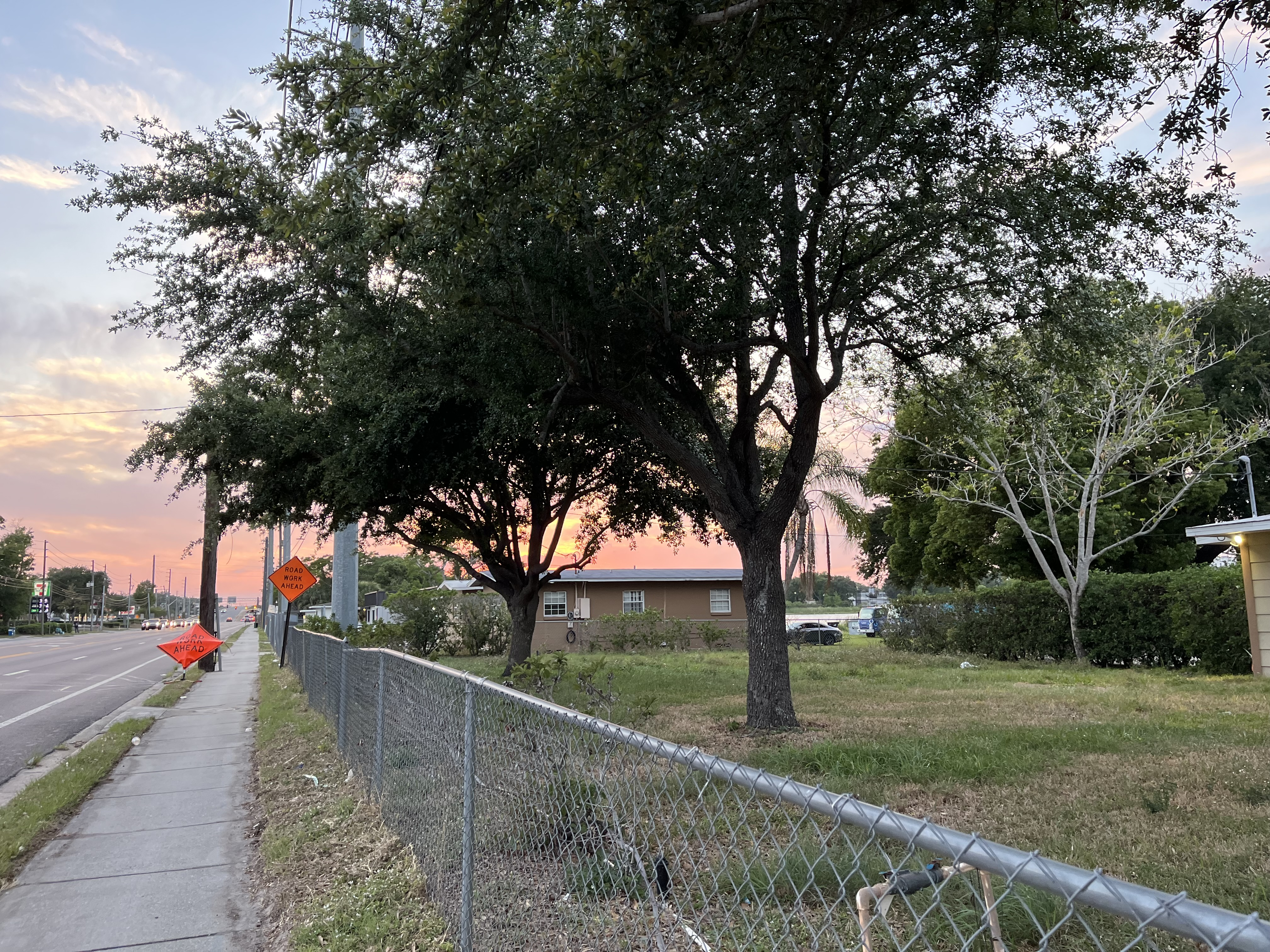
- Street scene in Pine Castle

- Location in Orange County and the state of Florida
- Coordinates: 28°27′58″N 81°22′37″W
- Country: United States
- State: Florida
- County: Orange
- Incorporated (town): February 26, 1925
- Unincorporated: 1930

Area
  - Total: 2.69 sq mi (6.98 km^{2})
  - Land: 2.42 sq mi (6.26 km^{2})
  - Water: 0.27 sq mi (0.71 km^{2})
- Elevation: 102 ft (31 m)

Population (2020)
  - Total: 11,122
  - Density: 4,597.9/sq mi (1,775.27/km^{2})
- Time zone: UTC-5 (Eastern (EST))
  - Summer (DST): UTC-4 (EDT)
- ZIP code: 32809
- Area codes: 407, 689
- FIPS code: 12-56500
- GNIS feature ID: 2403409

Pine Castle is a census-designated place and unincorporated area in Orange County, Florida, United States. As of the 2020 census, Pine Castle had a population of 11,122. It is part of the Orlando–Kissimmee–Sanford, Florida Metropolitan Statistical Area.

== History ==
Initially settled in 1870, the town's development has been shaped by that of Orlando, approximately 5 miles (8 km) to the north. From just before 1882 the South Florida Railroad mainline, which became part of the Plant System in 1893 and the Atlantic Coast Line Railroad in 1902, provided regular rapid passenger and freight service. The town officially incorporated in 1925, but later reverted to unincorporated development. The population was 10,805 at the 2010 census. Passenger trains operated by successor Seaboard Coast Line A Line from 1967 then Amtrak after 1971 bypassed the local depot, with nearest stops in Orlando and Kissimmee. Passenger rail service returned with the opening of SunRail's Sand Lake Road station in 2014.

== Geography ==
According to the United States Census Bureau, the CDP has a total area of 7.3 km^{2} (2.8 mi^{2}), of which 6.8 km^{2} (2.6 mi^{2}) is land and 0.5 km^{2} (0.2 mi^{2}) (7.42%) is water.

== Demographics ==
Historical population
Year	Pop.	±%
1925	425	—
1930	481	+13.2%
1935	564	+17.3%
2020	11,122	+1872.0%
U.S. Decennial Census Florida Department of Agriculture; Source: U.S. Decennial Census

=== 2020 census ===
As of the 2020 census, Pine Castle had a population of 11,122. The median age was 35.3 years. 25.4% of residents were under the age of 18 and 11.4% of residents were 65 years of age or older. For every 100 females there were 101.2 males, and for every 100 females age 18 and over there were 99.1 males age 18 and over.

100.0% of residents lived in urban areas, while 0.0% lived in rural areas.

There were 3,735 households in Pine Castle, of which 38.8% had children under the age of 18 living in them. Of all households, 39.5% were married-couple households, 20.3% were households with a male householder and no spouse or partner present, and 29.6% were households with a female householder and no spouse or partner present. About 20.5% of all households were made up of individuals and 6.5% had someone living alone who was 65 years of age or older.

There were 3,994 housing units, of which 6.5% were vacant. The homeowner vacancy rate was 2.2% and the rental vacancy rate was 5.3%.

Racial composition as of the 2020 census
Race	Number	Percent
White	3,503	31.5%
Black or African American	1,857	16.7%
American Indian and Alaska Native	98	0.9%
Asian	401	3.6%
Native Hawaiian and Other Pacific Islander	13	0.1%
Some other race	2,527	22.7%
Two or more races	2,723	24.5%
Hispanic or Latino (of any race)	6,211	55.8%

=== 2000 census ===
As of the 2000 census, there were 8,803 people, 3,130 households, and 2,228 families residing in the CDP. The population density was 1,297.3/km^{2} (3,364.5/mi^{2}). There were 3,302 housing units at an average density of 486.6/km^{2} (1,262.0/mi^{2}). The racial makeup of the CDP was 68.78% White, 12.80% African American, 0.86% Native American, 2.58% Asian, 0.20% Pacific Islander, 10.24% from other races, and 4.53% from two or more races. Hispanic or Latino of any race were 35.60% of the population.

There were 3,130 households, out of which 35.6% had children under the age of 18 living with them, 46.4% were married couples living together, 16.2% had a female householder with no husband present, and 28.8% were non-families. 19.9% of all households were made up of individuals, and 5.7% had someone living alone who was 65 years of age or older. The average household size was 2.81 and the average family size was 3.20.

In the CDP, the population was spread out, with 26.9% under the age of 18, 10.5% from 18 to 24, 33.4% from 25 to 44, 20.0% from 45 to 64, and 9.2% who were 65 years of age or older. The median age was 33 years. For every 100 females, there were 103.7 males. For every 100 females age 18 and over, there were 101.9 males.

The median income for a household in the CDP was $34,448, and the median income for a family was $37,969. Males had a median income of $25,908 versus $22,019 for females. The per capita income for the CDP was $16,767. About 13.3% of families and 15.0% of the population were below the poverty line, including 21.1% of those under age 18 and 3.8% of those age 65 or over.

== Industry ==
The name "Pine Castle" has been associated with several industrial projects. In 1925, boat manufacturer Correct Craft founded its original factory in Pine Castle, before constructing a larger facility in 2006. In the mid-1940s, Bell Aircraft Corporation tested its X-1 supersonic rocket plane at Pinecastle Army Airfield, because of the area's then-remote location and 10,000-foot (3,000 m) runway. The airfield, located 2 miles (3 km) southeast of Pine Castle, has since become Orlando International Airport.

== Education ==
The Pine Castle Christian Academy won state championships in three high school sports.

Pine Castle Elementary School was established in 1877.
