= Hunter's Creek, Florida =

Unincorporated area in Florida, US

- Census-designated place
- Location in Orange County and the state of Florida
- Coordinates: 28°22′12″N 81°25′45″W
- Country: United States
- State: Florida
- County: Orange

Area
  - Total: 7.07 sq mi (18.32 km^{2})
  - Land: 7.05 sq mi (18.25 km^{2})
  - Water: 0.027 sq mi (0.07 km^{2})
- Elevation: 82 ft (25 m)

Population (2020)
  - Total: 24,433
  - Density: 3,467.8/sq mi (1,338.91/km^{2})
- Time zone: UTC-5 (Eastern (EST))
  - Summer (DST): UTC-4 (EDT)
- Postal code: 32837
- Area codes: 407, 321
- FIPS code: 12-32967
- GNIS feature ID: 2402605

Hunter's Creek is a master planned, unincorporated community and census-designated place in Orange County, Florida, United States. It is part of the Orlando–Kissimmee–Sanford, Florida Metropolitan Statistical Area. The population was 24,433 at the 2020 census. It has grown up around a large planned community named Hunter's Creek, though the CDP name given by the United States Census Bureau lacks the apostrophe.

== History ==
Genstar Development Company based out of Canada owned a massive tract of land in south Orange County Florida totaling up to 3,840 acres. Planning of the upscale community began as early as 1984 with an official kick-off construction announcement in 1986, noting that this was a 15- to 20-year project. Genstar sold much of the remaining development in 1987 for $25,832,000 to American Newland Associates, a California general partnership. August 1997 AG Land Associates, LLC (f/k/a American Newland Associates) sells some of the undeveloped acreages to Westbrook Hunter's Creek, LP for $42,589,200. The majority of the community was built in the late 1980s and 1990s, and some of the community is still under construction.

== Geography ==
According to the United States Census Bureau, the CDP has a total area of 3.8 square miles (9.9 km^{2}), all land.

Lake Calabay is a manmade dredged freshwater lake in Hunter's Creek.

== Demographics ==
Historical population
Census	Pop.	Note	%±
2020	24,433		—
U.S. Decennial Census

As of the census of 2000, there were 9,369 people, 3,460 households, and 2,498 families residing in the CDP. The population density was 841.3 people/km^{2} (2,179 people/mi^{2}). There were 3,870 housing units at an average density of 347.5 units/km^{2} (900 units/mi^{2}). The racial makeup of the CDP was 81.84% White, 5.18% African American, 0.14% Native American, 7.16% Asian, 0.02% Pacific Islander, 3.02% from other races, and 2.64% from two or more races. Hispanic or Latino of any race were 13.83% of the population.

There were 3,460 households, out of which 37.7% had children under the age of 18 living with them, 62.3% were married couples living together, 6.7% had a female householder with no husband present, and 27.8% were non-families. 19.2% of all households were made up of individuals, and 2.2% had someone living alone who was 65 years of age or older. The average household size was 2.68 and the average family size was 3.12.

In the CDP, the population was spread out, with 26.2% under the age of 18, 7.0% from 18 to 24, 37.3% from 25 to 44, 23.4% from 45 to 64, and 6.2% who were 65 years of age or older. The median age was 35 years. For every 100 females, there were 97.7 males. For every 100 females age 18 and over, there were 95.3 males.

The median income for a household in the CDP was $67,775, and the median income for a family was $76,323. Males had a median income of $51,625 versus $35,625 for females. The per capita income for the CDP was $29,170. About 3.2% of families and 4.2% of the population were below the poverty line, including 3.8% of those under age 18 and 3.3% of those age 65 or over.

== Education ==
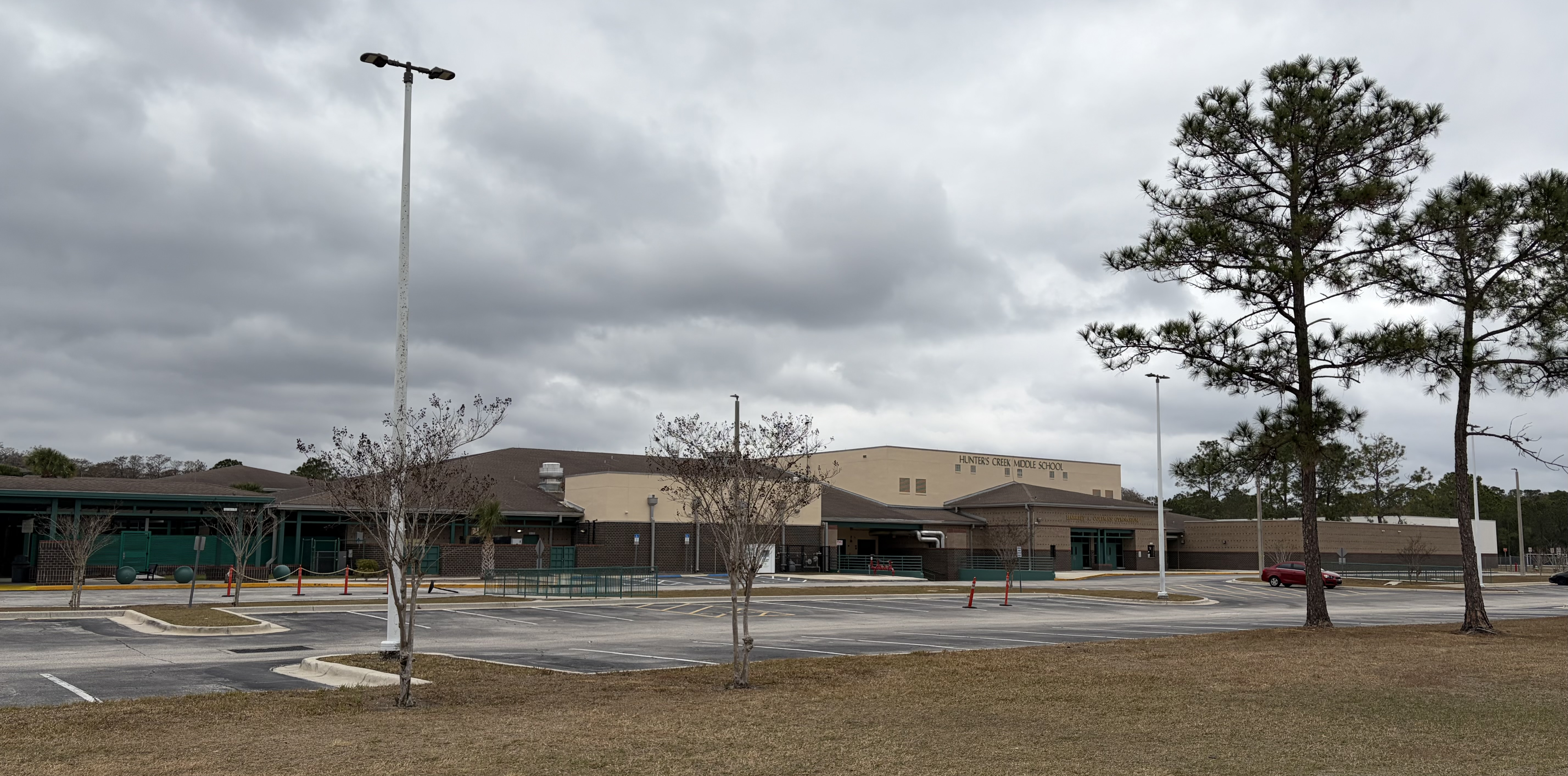
Hunter’s Creek Middle School

=== Elementary schools ===
- Hunter's Creek Elementary School
- Endeavor Elementary School
- West Creek Elementary School

=== Junior high (secondary, middle) schools ===
- Hunter's Creek Middle School
- Freedom Middle School

=== High schools ===
- Freedom High School

=== Charter schools ===
- Renaissance Charter School at Hunter's Creek

=== Neighborhoods ===
There are 38 single family home neighborhoods in Hunter's Creek. They are:

- Ashton
- Braddock Oaks
- Calabay Cove
- Carrington
- Casa Vista
- Chalfont
- Chartres Gardens
- Chelsea Landing
- Cypress Pointe
- Devlin Green
- Eagles Landing
- Fairways
- Falcon Pointe
- Flora Vista
- Foxhaven
- Glenhurst
- Heather Glen
- Hunter's Isle
- Keaton's Crest
- Mallard Cove
- Mar Vista
- Montara
- Ocita
- Orista Bay
- Pace's Mill
- Palma Vista
- The Pointe
- Quail Lake
- Raintree
- Sandhill Trace
- Settlers Landing
- Sierra Vista
- Tanglewood
- Terra Vista
- Timucua Village
- Vida Vista
- Villanova at Hunters Creek
- Westshire

There are ten multi family home neighborhoods in Hunters Creek. They are:

- Burano Hunter's Creek (formerly Cottages at Hunter's Creek)
- Audubon Villas
- Camden Hunter's Creek
- Capri at Hunter's Creek
- Colonial Grand at Heather Glen
- Golfview at Hunter's Creek
- The Parks at Hunter's Creek
- The Parkway at Hunter's Creek
- Urbana
- Villanova

=== Media ===
- Life in Hunter's Creek - A magazine serving the community
