= Meadow Woods, Florida =

Unincorporated area in Florida, US

- Census-designated place
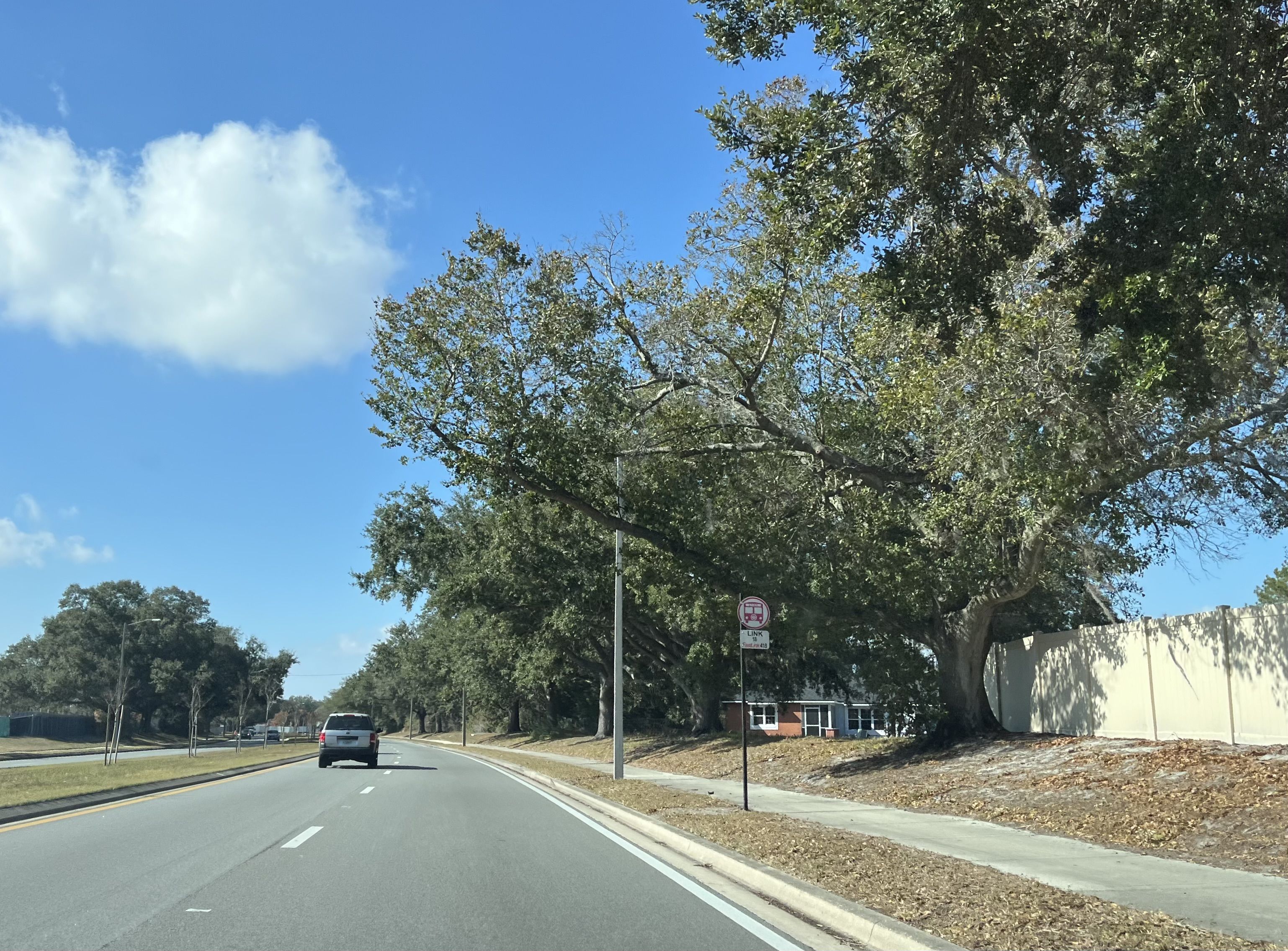
- Landstar Boulevard in Meadow Woods, Florida

- Location in Orange County and the state of Florida
- Coordinates: 28°23′15″N 81°21′40″W
- Country: United States
- State: Florida
- County: Orange

Area
  - Total: 11.46 sq mi (29.68 km^{2})
  - Land: 11.17 sq mi (28.93 km^{2})
  - Water: 0.29 sq mi (0.75 km^{2})
- Elevation: 82 ft (25 m)

Population (2020)
  - Total: 43,790
  - Density: 3,919.8/sq mi (1,513.46/km^{2})
- Time zone: UTC-5 (Eastern (EST))
  - Summer (DST): UTC-4 (EDT)
- ZIP code: 32824
- Area codes: 407, 689
- FIPS code: 12-43800
- GNIS feature ID: 2403272

Meadow Woods is a census-designated place (CDP) and an unincorporated suburban development area located in southern Orange County, Florida, United States, between Orlando International Airport and Kissimmee. It is part of the Orlando–Kissimmee–Sanford, Florida Metropolitan Statistical Area. As of 2020, the population was 43,790.

== Geography ==
Meadow Woods is located in the southern portion of Orange County outside of the Orlando city limits. Its southern side is adjacent to Buenaventura Lakes in Osceola County, to the west is located Southchase (Orange County), to the north are the unincorporated community of Taft and the Boggy Creek neighborhood of Orlando city proper, and to the east are Orlando International Airport and Lake Nona.

According to the United States Census Bureau, the CDP has a total area of 29.6 km^{2} (11.4 sq mi), of which 29.4 km^{2} (11.4 sq mi) is land and 0.1 km^{2} (0.039 sq mi) (0.35%) is water.

== Demographics ==
Historical population
Census	Pop.	Note	%±
1990	4,876		—
2000	11,286		131.5%
2010	25,558		126.5%
2020	43,790		71.3%

=== Racial and ethnic composition ===
Meadow Woods racial composition (Hispanics excluded from racial categories) (NH = Non-Hispanic)
Race	Pop 2010	Pop 2020	% 2010	% 2020
White (NH)	3,762	5,984	14.72%	13.67%
Black or African American (NH)	2,784	4,543	10.89%	10.37%
Native American or Alaska Native (NH)	30	37	0.12%	0.08%
Asian (NH)	1,127	2,419	4.41%	5.52%
Pacific Islander or Native Hawaiian (NH)	46	54	0.18%	0.12%
Some other race (NH)	212	562	0.83%	1.28%
Two or more races/Multiracial (NH)	412	1,263	1.61%	2.88%
Hispanic or Latino (any race)	17,185	28,928	67.24%	66.06%
Total	25,558	43,790		

=== 2020 census ===
As of the 2020 census, Meadow Woods had a population of 43,790. The median age was 35.4 years. 25.2% of residents were under the age of 18 and 9.8% of residents were 65 years of age or older. For every 100 females there were 92.5 males, and for every 100 females age 18 and over there were 89.3 males age 18 and over.

98.8% of residents lived in urban areas, while 1.2% lived in rural areas.

There were 13,326 households in Meadow Woods, of which 46.1% had children under the age of 18 living in them. Of all households, 55.8% were married-couple households, 12.0% were households with a male householder and no spouse or partner present, and 24.0% were households with a female householder and no spouse or partner present. About 12.3% of all households were made up of individuals and 3.5% had someone living alone who was 65 years of age or older.

There were 14,062 housing units, of which 5.2% were vacant. The homeowner vacancy rate was 1.7% and the rental vacancy rate was 5.6%.

Racial composition as of the 2020 census
Race	Number	Percent
White	11,358	25.9%
Black or African American	5,183	11.8%
American Indian and Alaska Native	190	0.4%
Asian	2,483	5.7%
Native Hawaiian and Other Pacific Islander	58	0.1%
Some other race	10,235	23.4%
Two or more races	14,283	32.6%
Hispanic or Latino (of any race)	28,928	66.1%

=== 2020 American Community Survey ===
According to the 2020 American Community Survey, there were 8,737 families residing in the CDP.

=== 2010 census ===
As of the 2010 United States census, there were 25,558 people, 7,111 households, and 6,145 families residing in the CDP.

=== 2000 census ===
As of the census of 2000, there were 11,286 people, 3,472 households, and 2,850 families residing in the CDP. The population density was 383.2 people/km^{2} (992 people/mi^{2}). There were 4,441 housing units at an average density of 150.8 units/km^{2} (391 units/mi^{2}). The racial makeup of the CDP was 66.99% White, 11.95% African American, 0.55% Native American, 2.42% Asian, 0.12% Pacific Islander, 13.32% from other races, and 4.65% from two or more races. Hispanic or Latino of any race were 52.84% of the population.

In 2000, there were 3,472 households, out of which 44.8% had children under the age of 18 living with them, 60.9% were married couples living together, 15.7% had a female householder with no husband present, and 17.9% were non-families. 11.3% of all households were made up of individuals, and 2.9% had someone living alone who was 65 years of age or older. The average household size was 3.25 and the average family size was 3.52.

In 2000, in the CDP, the population was spread out, with 29.8% under the age of 18, 9.3% from 18 to 24, 32.1% from 25 to 44, 20.7% from 45 to 64, and 8.0% who were 65 years of age or older. The median age was 33 years. For every 100 females, there were 94.1 males. For every 100 females age 18 and over, there were 89.1 males.

In 2000, the median income for a household in the CDP was $46,033, and the median income for a family was $48,076. Males had a median income of $30,081 versus $21,960 for females. The per capita income for the CDP was $15,805. About 5.9% of families and 7.5% of the population were below the poverty line, including 8.9% of those under age 18 and 10.0% of those age 65 or over.

== Transportation ==
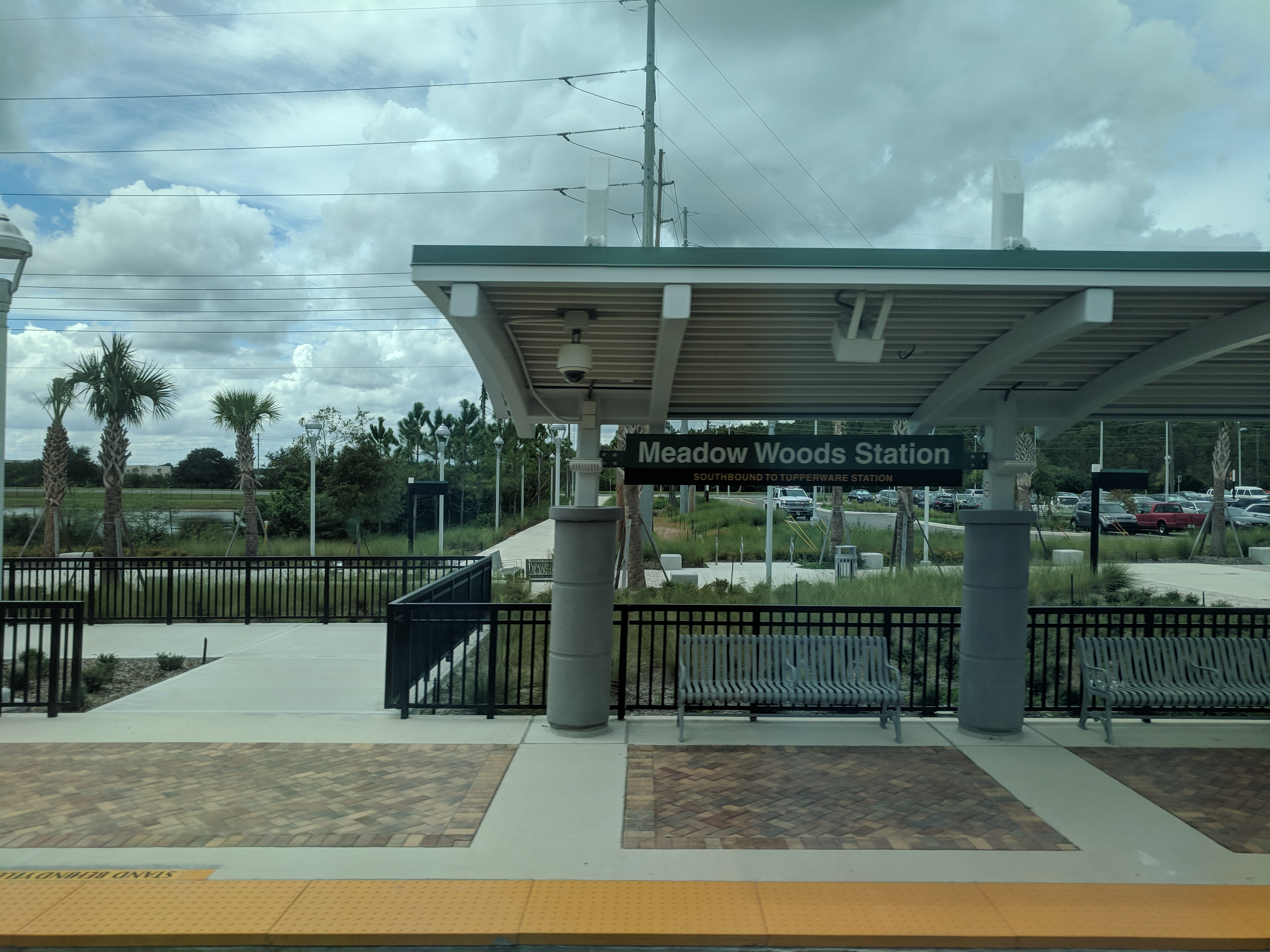
Meadow Woods Sunrail Station

The major roads of the small community of Meadow Woods are Landstar Boulevard, Town Center Boulevard/Rhode Island Woods Circle/Wyndham Lakes Boulevard, and Weatherbee Road.

The Central Florida Greeneway (SR 417) serves Meadow Woods, which has an access at the intersection with Landstar Boulevard at Exit 14.

Orlando International Airport borders Meadow Woods to the north and east.

SunRail commuter rail service opened a Meadow Woods station at the northwest corner of the community in June 2018. The rail line also handles Amtrak's Silver Service lines as well as several CSX freight trains.

Meadow Woods is served by Lynx bus routes 18 (on Landstar Boulevard) and FastLink 418 (on Rhode Island Woods Circle). In June 2013, Orange County Commissioner Jennifer Thompson asked for $300,000 funding for the latter route, which provides a connection to the Sand Lake Road SunRail station, which currently serves as the rail line's interim southern terminus. With installation of the new Sunrail train station, the bus routes has been adjusted a little bit.

== Points of interest ==
- Meadow Woods Recreation Center with a community gym and offices is located within a park area
- Several elementary and middle grade schools
- Warehouses for Whirlpool Corporation, Sealy Mattresses, Siemens
- South Orange Youth Sports Complex includes several baseball fields
- Newly expanded shopping plaza at Town Center and Landstar
