= Poinciana station =

Railway station in Florida, United States

Poinciana
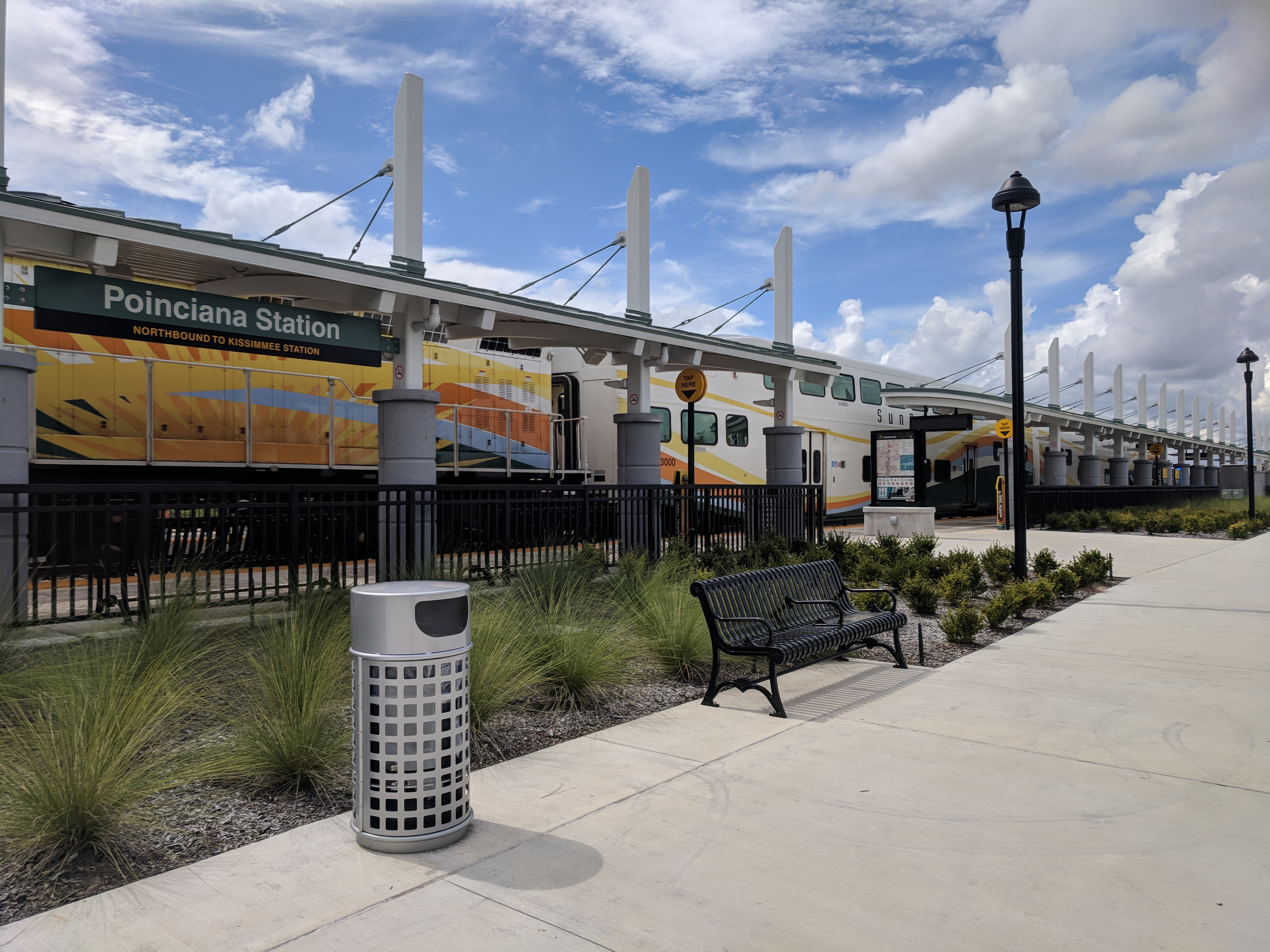
- SunRail train stopped at Poinciana station

General information
- Location: 5025 South Rail Avenue; Kissimmee, Florida
- Coordinates: 28°15′32″N 81°29′04″W
- Platforms: 2 side platforms
- Tracks: 2
- Connections: : 306, NeighborLink 604, Citrus Connection 19X

Construction
- Parking: 254 spaces
- Cycle facilities: Yes

Other information
- Fare zone: Osceola

History
- Opened: September 16, 1974
- Closed: December 8, 1975
- Rebuilt: July 30, 2018

Passengers
- FY 2026: 104,314 ▲6.9%

Services
Preceding station	SunRail	Following station
Terminus	SunRail	Kissimmee toward DeLand
Former services
Preceding station	Amtrak	Following station
Lakeland toward St. Petersburg or Miami	Floridian	Orlando toward Chicago
Lakeland toward St. Petersburg	Champion	Orlando toward New York
Location

Poinciana station is a train station in the community of Poinciana, Florida. It is the southern terminus of SunRail, the commuter rail service of Greater Orlando. The station opened on July 30, 2018. The site was briefly used by Amtrak from 1974 to 1975. In addition to Poinciana, the station also serves the nearby communities of Intercession City and Campbell.

== History ==
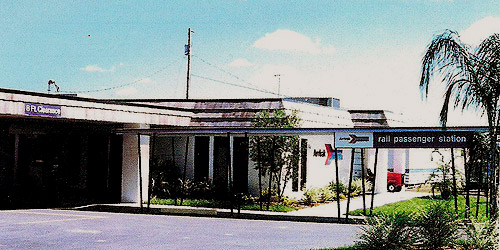
Poinciana station around 1975

In the mid-1970s, the site was planned as the southern terminus for Amtrak's inaugural auto ferry service called AutoTrak connecting Florida to Indianapolis Union Station, in competition with the Auto-Train Corporation's Auto-Train service. Amtrak initially built a complex with a 1,600 square foot modular building, a parking lot and two spur-lines with eventual plans for a 7,000 square foot facility. The initial complex opened on September 16, 1974, with the simultaneous arrival of the Floridian and the Champion trains. It was envisioned to be the official stop for tourists bound for Walt Disney World. The AutoTrak service never came to life, however, and the station was used for just over a year as a stop for the Champion and the Floridian until December 12, 1975, when those trains began stopping at Kissimmee instead. Sometime in the 1980s, the station building was demolished, the spur-lines were removed and the parking lot along with the access road into the site were abandoned and eventually overgrew with vegetation over the years. The site sat vacant until construction of the Poinciana SunRail station began in early 2016.
