= DeLand station =

Passenger train station in DeLand, Florida

DeLand, FL
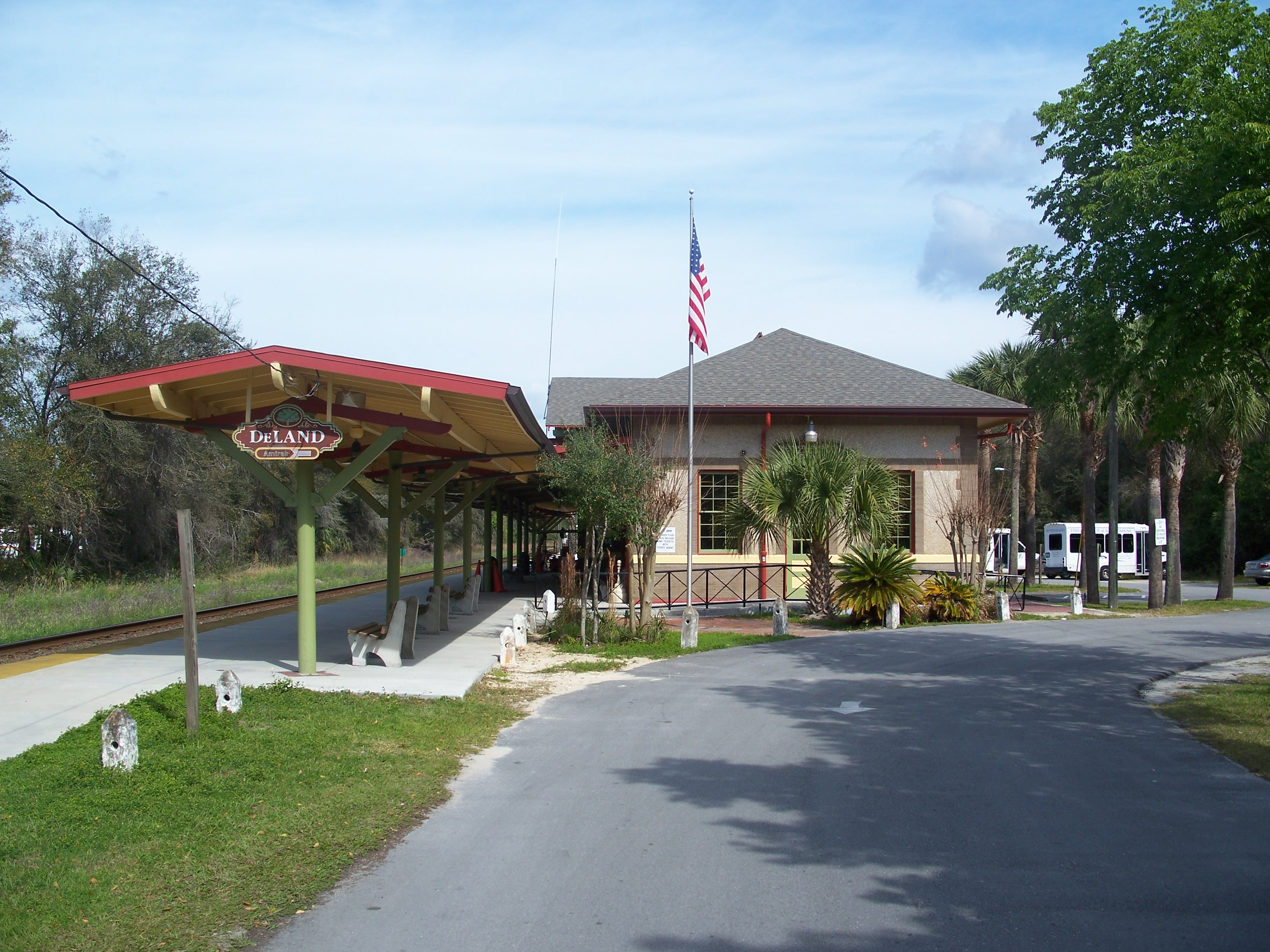
- Deland station in March 2008

General information
- Location: 2491 Old New York Avenue; DeLand, Florida; United States
- Coordinates: 29.017806°N 81.35272°W
- Platforms: 1 side platform, 1 island platform
- Tracks: 2
- Connections: Votran: 34, VoRide rideshare

Construction
- Parking: Yes
- Cycle facilities: Yes
- Accessible: Yes

Other information
- Station code: Amtrak: DLD
- Fare zone: Volusia (SunRail)

History
- Opened: 1918 (ACL)
- Rebuilt: June 6, 1988 (Amtrak); August 12, 2024 (SunRail)

Passengers
- FY 2025: 19,366 (Amtrak)
- FY 2026: 57,656 ▲30.2% (SunRail)

Services
Preceding station	Amtrak	Following station
Winter Park toward Miami	Floridian	Palatka toward Chicago
Winter Park toward Miami	Silver Meteor	Palatka toward New York
Auto Train does not stop here
Preceding station	SunRail	Following station
DeBary toward Poinciana	SunRail	Terminus
Former services
Preceding station	Amtrak	Following station
Winter Park toward Miami	Silver Star Until 2024	Palatka toward New York
Palatka toward Los Angeles	Sunset Limited 1993–2005	Sanford toward Orlando or Miami
Sanford toward St. Petersburg	Floridian 1971–1979	Jacksonville toward Chicago
Preceding station	Atlantic Coast Line Railroad	Following station
Orange City toward Tampa	Main Line	DeLeon Springs toward Richmond
Location

DeLand station (DeLand/Amtrak on SunRail maps) is a train station in DeLand, Florida, United States, located west of the downtown area. It is served by SunRail commuter rail service and Amtrak Floridian and Silver Meteor intercity service.

== History ==
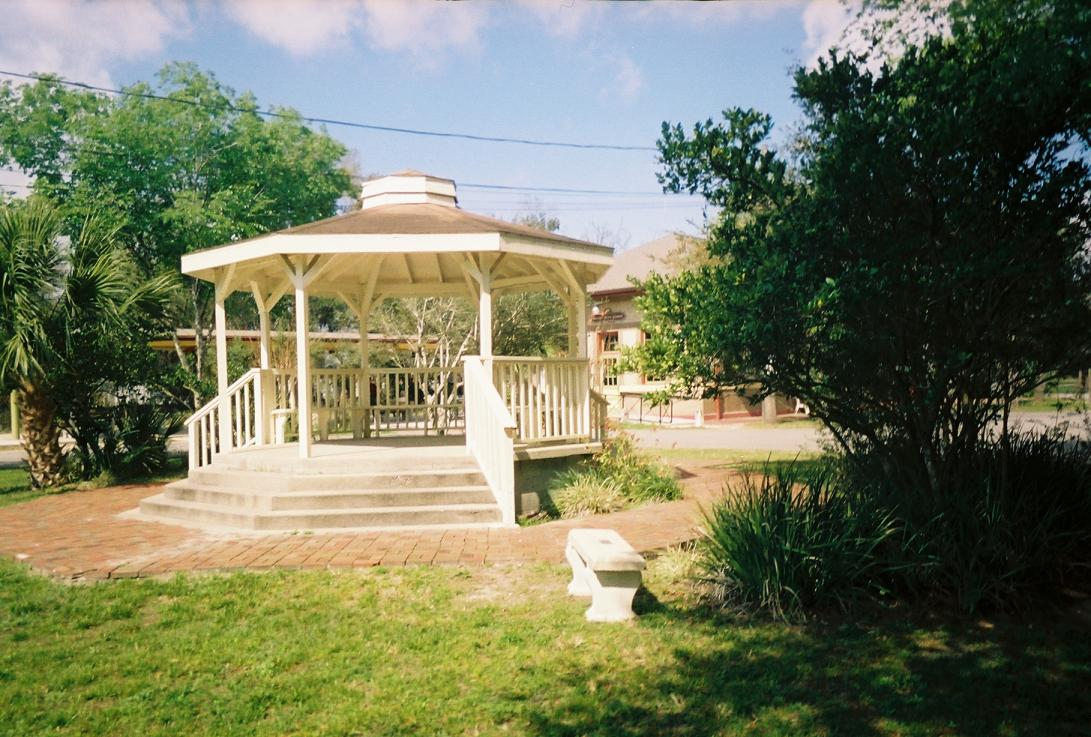
Station gazebo in 2008.

DeLand station was originally built in 1918, and stood across from the former Volusia County Fairgrounds. When the Jacksonville, Tampa and Key West Railroad (and later the Atlantic Coast Line Railroad) ran passenger service along the line, they also ran local passenger service to downtown DeLand over the DeLand Spur. The station was acquired by Amtrak and restored in 1988, although a second track at the station fell into disuse. Up until 2005, when it was truncated to New Orleans, the station also served as a stop for the Sunset Limited.

In 2006, the station was rededicated following a $424,000 restoration undertaken through a partnership between Volusia County, Amtrak, and CSX Transportation; funding primarily came from the Florida Department of Transportation. Work included installation of a new roof and platform canopy, remodeling of the bathrooms, and painting of the building in historically appropriate colors. In 2007, the station received a Preservation Award from the Florida Trust for Historic Preservation.

DeLand station was planned as the northern terminus of the SunRail commuter rail system. This led to the resumption of maintenance of the neglected second track and other station upgrades. The station saw the addition of an 184-space park, ride lot, and bus drop-off area. The station could "spur economic development on the west end of the city, heading toward the St. Johns River." Ground broke on the extension in May 2023. The new service to DeLand began on August 12, 2024.

On November 10, 2024, the Silver Star was merged with the Capitol Limited as the Floridian.
