= Longwood Historic District =

Longwood Historic District may refer to:

- Longwood Historic District (Longwood, Florida)
- Longwood Historic District (Brookline, Massachusetts), listed on the NRHP in Massachusetts
- Longwood Historic District (Bronx), New York

== See also ==
- Longwood (disambiguation)
