= Longwood =

Longwood may refer to:

== Australia ==
- Longwood, Victoria

== India ==
- Longwood, Shimla

== New Zealand ==
- Longwood, New Zealand

== Republic of Ireland ==
- Longwood, County Meath

== United Kingdom ==
- Longwood, West Yorkshire, England
- Longwood, Saint Helena, location of Napoleon's second exile

== United States ==
- Longwood, Florida
  - Longwood Historic District (Longwood, Florida)
- Longwood (Baton Rouge, Louisiana)
- Longwood (Glenwood, Maryland), a historic plantation
- Longwood Medical and Academic Area in Boston, Massachusetts
- Longwood Historic District (Brookline, Massachusetts)
- Longwood Cricket Club in Chestnut Hill, Massachusetts
- Longwood (Natchez, Mississippi), an antebellum mansion
- Longwood, Missouri
- Longwood, Bronx, New York
  - Longwood Historic District (Bronx, New York)
- Longwood Central School District, Long Island, New York
- The Longwood Estate, part of Manor St. George in Ridge, New York
- Longwood (Milton, North Carolina)
- Longwood (Earlysville, Virginia)
- Longwood House (Farmville, Virginia), a historic home
- Longwood University in Farmville, Virginia
  - Longwood Lancers, the school's athletics program
- Longwood (Gordonsville, Virginia)
- Longwood, Wisconsin, a town
  - Longwood (community), Wisconsin, an unincorporated community

== See also ==
- Battle of Longwoods
- Longwood Gardens in Kennett Square, Pennsylvania
- Longwood station (disambiguation)
