= Chad Kessler =

American football player (born 1975)

No. 80
- Position: Punter

Personal information
- Born: June 24, 1975 (age 51); Orlando, Florida, U.S.
- Listed height: 6 ft 1 in (1.85 m)
- Listed weight: 197 lb (89 kg)

Career information
- High school: Lake Mary (Lake Mary, Florida)
- College: LSU (1993–1997)

Awards and highlights
- Consensus All-American (1997); 2× First-team All-SEC (1995, 1997)

Chad Stephen Kessler (born June 24, 1975) is an American former college football punter who played for the LSU Tigers. He was a consensus All-American in 1997.

== Early life ==
Chad Stephen Kessler was born on June 24, 1975, in Orlando, Florida. He attended Lake Mary High School in Lake Mary, Florida. He was a placekicker, punter, and quarterback in high school.

== College career ==
Kessler played college football for the LSU Tigers of Louisiana State University from 1994 to 1997. He redshirted in 1993. He was named first-team All-SEC in 1995. As a senior in the 1997 season, Kessler set the NCAA Division I record for single-season punting average at 50.28 yards per punt, standing until it was broken by Texas A&M punter Braden Mann in 2018. Kessler was also the first punter in NCAA history to have a single-season average of over 50 yards. He was again named first-team All-SEC in 1997 and was a consensus All-American selection in 1997. Kessler finished his college career with totals of 187 punts for 7,976 yards and a 42.7 average. He was a National Football Foundation Scholar-Athlete in 1997 as well. He graduated with a 3.91 grade point average in microbiology.

== Professional career ==
Kessler signed with the Tampa Bay Buccaneers on April 20, 1998, after going undrafted in the 1998 NFL draft. He was waived on August 5, 1998.

== Personal life ==
Kessler later graduated from LSU Health Sciences Center New Orleans, and became an ear, nose and throat doctor.
