= Longwood station =

Longwood station may refer to:

- 95th Street/Longwood station, a Metra station in Chicago, Illinois
- Longwood station (MBTA), a light rail station in Brookline, Massachusetts
- Longwood Medical Area station, a light rail station in Boston, Massachusetts
- Longwood Avenue station, a subway station in Bronx, New York
- Longwood station (SunRail), a SunRail train station in Longwood, Florida

== See also ==
- Longwood (disambiguation)
