= Votran =

Public transit system in Volusia County, Florida

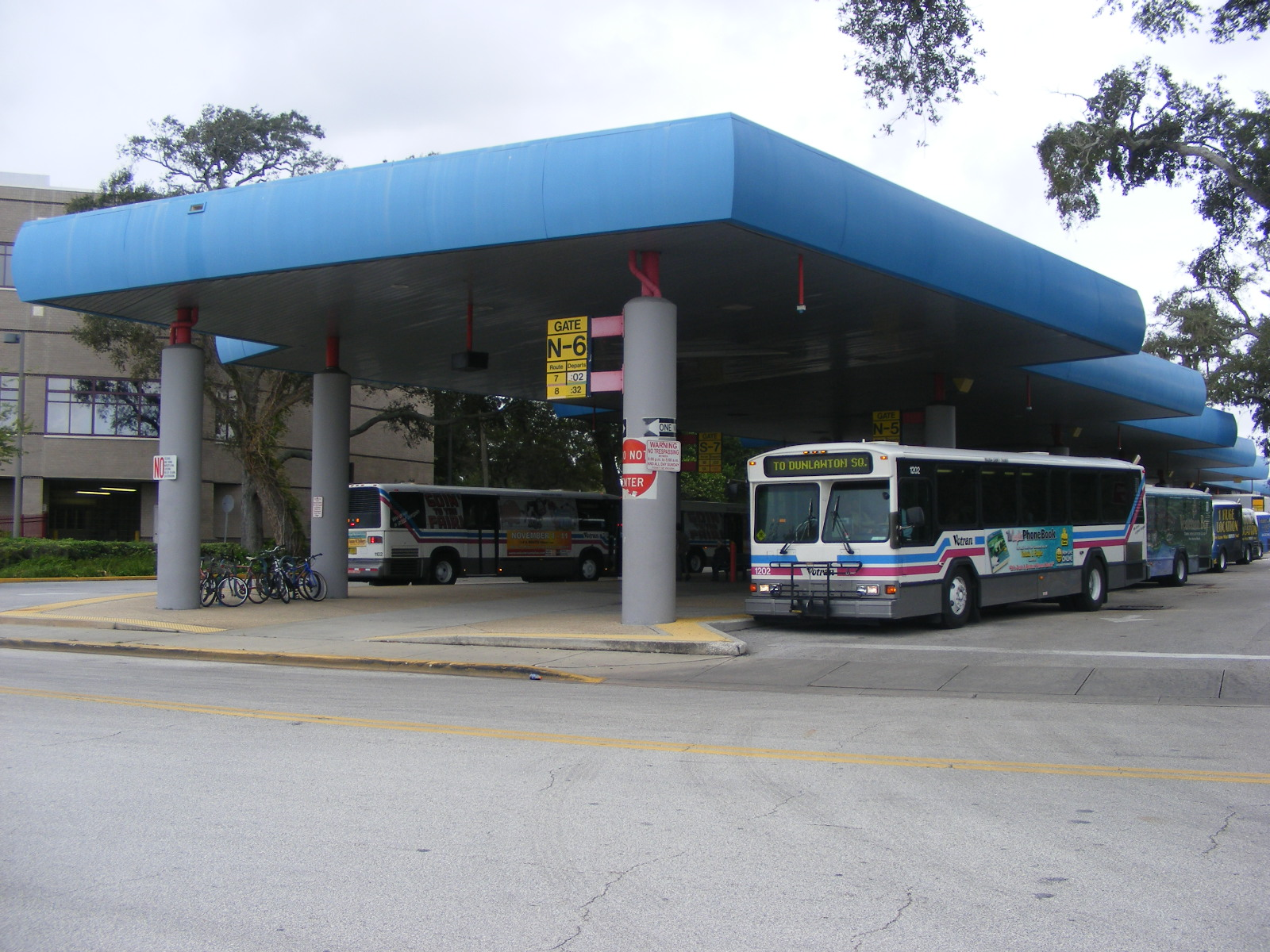
- Votran Transfer Plaza in downtown Daytona Beach
- Parent: Government of Volusia County
- Founded: 1975
- Headquarters: 950 Big Tree Road; South Daytona, Florida 32119-2518
- Service area: Volusia County, Florida
- Service type: Bus, paratransit
- Routes: 28
- Hubs: DeLand; Daytona Beach; New Smyrna Beach
- Fleet: 114 buses
- Daily ridership: 7,451
- Annual ridership: 2,289,411
- Fuel type: Diesel
- Operator: First Transit (management)
- Website: votran.org

Votran, officially the Volusia County Public Transit System is the public transportation system of Volusia County, Florida, United States. The system was established in 1975. Votran provides fixed bus and paratransit service throughout the entire county

Single rides are $2 per trip, or $4 for a 24-hour pass.

== History ==
Although the county is employing the Votran personnel directly, the management of the Votran system is contracted to First Transit. First Transit replaced RATP Dev, who had been in contract since the establishment of Votran in 1975, in 2020.

== Operations Facilities ==
Votran houses its main operations center and bus garage/yard in Daytona Beach (950 Big Tree Rd., Daytona Beach, FL 32119), which handles all administrative and a vast majority of other agency functions. Because of the distance between Daytona Beach and DeLand, a second facility is located in Orange City (near US Hwy 17/92) by which encompasses a bus garage/yard area and some operations and light-duty maintenance functions.

== Stations ==
Votran has three main stations:

- Transfer Plaza, corner of N. Palmetto Avenue and M M Bethune Blvd., Daytona Beach. Buses meet and depart every half-hour; Monday–Saturday, 7 am – 7 pm.
- Intermodal Transfer Facility (ITF), 301 Earl Street and North Atlantic Ave. (FL Highway A1A), Daytona Beach. Buses meet and depart on every hour for evening and Sunday service; Monday–Saturday, 7–11 pm; Sunday 7 am – 6 pm.
- Intermodal Transfer Facility (ITF), South Woodland Blvd (US 17/92) and Euclid Ave., DeLand. Buses service the ITF between 4:34 am and 8:36pm

Other transfer locations are available at most shopping centers and where multiple buses cross paths.

== Routes ==
The Volusia County Government governs the county as three regions, and Votran does the same with its service. Bus routes are grouped into three regions:

- East (two hubs in Daytona Beach). The East side routes generally service the Daytona Beach, Port Orange, and Ormond Beach areas, With a connector (Route 60) to the DeLand area to connect with Routes 20, 24, and 31 on the Westside.
- Southeast (hub in New Smyrna Beach). There are Three Southeast Routes and Two Flex Service routes serving the New Smyrna Beachside and Mainland areas. Route 40 goes northbound to Port Orange via US1 and Nova Road to connect with the Eastside Routes near Dunlawton Square. Route 41 travels southbound serving Edgewater and Oak Hill. Route 44 serves State Road 44 in New Smyrna Beach.
- West (hub in Orange City). These routes include the 20, 21, 22, 23, 24, 31, 32, and 33, and service the DeBary, Deltona, DeLand and Orange City areas, with five out of the eight routes focused mainly on Deltona, though two of the three routes (route 21 & route 22) follow similar paths for most of their assigned trips (e.g. the 21 will stop at certain bus stops, with the 22 stopping at the same bus stop the following hour in the opposite direction). Route 24 connects DeLand to Pierson and Seville in northwestern Volusia County. Routes 31–33 were added for service to the DeBary SunRail Station starting May 1, 2014. Route 31 serves North DeLand to the DeBary SunRail Station (half-hourly, stops at all stops along the way), Route 32 starts in Deltona to the DeBary SunRail Station via Orange City (hourly, stops at all stops along the way), Route 33 began as a Limited Stop, or Express bus from Deltona to the DeBary SunRail station via Orange City (hourly, limited stops). In 2019, the route was modified to allow for more stops, but the "Express" designation remains unchanged on the website.

For the 20-series routes, service hours on the West Side are from roughly 5:30 a.m. – 7:30 p.m. Service runs hourly on the 20 & 23, bihourly on the 21/22, and thrice daily on the 24. The 30-series routes run during rush hour only, but start earlier and end later, because they are oriented towards people taking SunRail to work in Orlando.

The East Side division is the only one that provides Sunday and night service for its routes.

Votran created the Route 25 on February 25, 2019, but was discontinued due to low ridership in August 2020. Due to the COVID-19 pandemic, many routes have had to operate with reduced schedules.

=== Route Table ===
VTP stands for VORTRAN Transfer Plaza, and ITF stands for Intermodal Transit Facility.

Number		Name	Route	Frequency (min)						Link
Number		Name	Route	Week days		Eve nings	Satur days		Sun days	Link
1		A1A North	VTP - Palmetto - Memorial Bridge - Atlantic (ITF) - Ocean Shore - Bass - Dolphin (back Tarpon - Bass - Ocean Shore - Lynnhurst - John Anderson - Halifax - Granada - Atlantic - ... - VTP)	60		-	60		-	1
1n/1s		A1A North	ITF - Atlantic - Granada - Orchard - YMCA (back Lincoln - Yonge - Granada - ... - ITF)	-		60	-		60	1n 1s
3	3a	North Ridgewood	VTP - Ridgewood - Brentwood - Beach - 3rd - Ridgewood - Yonge - Granada - Perrott - Lincoln - Thompson Circle - Granada - Orchard - Willmette - US 1 - Hawaiian Tropic (back US 1 - Melrose - Andrews - Willmette - Yonge - Rosewood - Ridgewood - Granada - Yonge - ... VTP)	30	60	-	30	60	-	3a 3c
3	3b	North Ridgewood	VTP - Ridgewood - Brentwood - Beach - 3rd - Ridgewood - Yonge - Granada - Perrott - Lincoln - Thompson Circle - Granada - Orchard - Willmette - Ormond Beach Performing Arts Center & Senior Center (back Melrose - Andrews - Willmette - Yonge - Rosewood - Beach - Domicillio - Ridgewood - Granada - Yonge - ... VTP)	30	60	-	30	60	-	3b
3n/3s		North Ridgewood	ITF - Main - Ridgewood - Yonge - Granada - Nove - Trails Shopping Center (back Willmette - Orchard - Granada - ... - ITF)	-		60	-		60	3n 3s
4		South Ridgewood	VTP - Ridgewood - Nova - Swallow Drive	30		-	30		-	4
4n/4s		South Ridgewood	ITF - Main - Ridgewood - Nova - Dunlawton	-		60	-		60	4n 4s
5		Center Street	VTP - Ridgewood - Fairview - Beach - 3rd - Center - LPGA Boulevard - Nova - Walker - Center - Flomich - Nova (back 15th - Center - 3rd - ... - VTP)	60		-	-		-	5
6		North Nova	VTP - Ridgewood - George W. Engram - Jackson - Willis - White - Mason - Nova - 3rd - Vine - Brentwood - Derbyshire - 6th - Nove - 8th - Derbyshire - Alabama - Carolina - Fleming - Hand - Williamson - Ormond Towne Square (back Granada - Thompson Creek - Lincoln - Orchard - Willmette - Nova - ... - VTP)	60		-	60		-	6
7		South Nova	VTP - Beach - Bellevue - Nova - Swallow Drive - Nova - Spruce Creek - Taylor - Dunlawton (back Clyde Morris - Taylor - ... - VTP)	30		-	30		-	7
8		Halifax	VTP - International Speedway - Halifax - ITF - Halifax - Harvard - Atlantic - Bellair Plaza	60		-	60		-	8
10		Medical Center	VTP - Mary Bethune - MLK Jr. - George W. Engram - Keech - Mary Bethune - White - Dunn - Clyde Morris - International Speedway - Volusia Mall (back Jimmy Ann - Dunn - White - Willis - Welch - Mary Bethune - ... - VTP)	30		-	30		-	10
10n		Medical Center	ITF - Main - Mary Bethune - MLK Jr. - George W. Engram - Keech - Mary Bethune - White - Dunn - Jimmy Ann - Volusia Mall - International Speedway - Volusia Square Shopping Center (back Williamson - Bayless - Fentress - International Speedway - Clyde Morris - Dunn - ... - ITF)	-		60	-		-	10n
10s		Medical Center	ITF - Main - Mary Bethune - MLK Jr. - George W. Engram - Keech - Mary Bethune - White - Dunn - Clyde Morris - International Speedway - Volusia Square Shopping Center - Williamson - Tomoka Town Center/Tanger Outlet Mall - Williamson - Bayless - Fentress - International Speedway - Thames - Midway - Bellevue - International Speedway - Red John - County Jail (back Indian Lake - International Speedway - Bill France - Volusia Mall - Jimmy Ann - Dunn - ... - ITF)	-		-	-		60	10s
11		Tanger	VTP - Beach - Madison - Nova - Mason - Derbyshire - 3rd - Jimmy Ann - Mason - Clyde Morris - Dunn - Jimmy Ann - Volusia Mall - Bill France - International Speedway - Williamson - Tomoka Town Center/Tanger Outlet Mall (back Mason - Billa France - Volusia Mall - Jimmy Ann - ... - VTP); Night service goes to ITF	60		-	60		-	11
11n		Tanger	VTP - Beach - Madison - Nova - Mason - Derbyshire - 3rd - Jimmy Ann - Mason - Clyde Morris - Dunn - Jimmy Ann - Volusia Mall - Bill France - International Speedway - Williamson - Tomoka Town Center/Tanger Outlet Mall (back Mason - Billa France - Volusia Mall - Jimmy Ann - ... - VTP); Night service goes to ITF	-		120	-		-	11n
12		Clyde Morris	VTP - Beach - Wilder - Ridgewood - Beville - Clyde Morris - Herbert - City Center Drive - City Center Parkway - Dunlawton - Swallow Drive - Village - Dunlawton - Williamson - Pavilion Mall (back Williamson - ... - VTP)	60		-	60		-	12
15		Orange Avenue	VTP - Palmetto - Orange - MLK Jr. - South - Keech - Maley - Jean - Orange - Ridgewood - VTP	30		-	30		-	15
15n/15s		Orange Avenue	ITF - Main - Beach - Cedar - Ridgewood - Orange - MLK Jr. - South - Jean - Bellevue - Nova - Nova Village Market (back Nova - Bellevue - Jean - South - Keech - Orange - Ridgewood - ... - ITF)	-		60	-		60	15n 15s
17	17a	South Atlantic	VTP - Main Street Bridge/International Speedway - Atlantic - Lighthouse - Marine Science Center (back South Peninsula - Inlet Harbor - Atlantic - ... - VTP)	30	60	-	30	60	-	17a
17	17b	Dunlawton	VTP - Main Street Bridge/International Speedway - Atlantic - William V. Chapel Jr. Memorial Bridge - Dunlawton - Village Trail - Butterfly - Swallow Drive (back Village Trail - Nova - Herbert - Ridgewood - Dunlawton - ... - VTP)	30	60	-	30	60	-	17b
17n/17s		South Atlantic	ITF - Atlantic - William V. Chapel Jr. Memorial Bridge - Dunlawton	-		60	-		60	17n 17s
18		International Speedway	VTP - International Speedway - Clyde Morris - Richard Petty - Midway - Catalina - Airport - Catalina - Midway - Volusia Mall - Bill France - Clyde Morris - LPGA Boulevard - Williamson - Ormond Towne Square - Granada - Atlantic - ITF - Atlantic - International Speedway - VTP	60		-	60		-	18
19		Granada	VTP - International Speedway - Atlantic - ITF - Atlantic - Granada - Ormond Towne Square - Williamson - LPGA Boulevard - Clyde Morris - Bill France - Volusia Mall - Midway - Catalina - Airport - Catalina - Midway - Richard Petty - Clyde Morris - International Speedway - VTP	60		-	60		-	19
20		Deland - Deltona	Northgate Shopping Center - International Speedway - Spring Garden - Plymouth - Woodland - Wisconsin - Florida - Rich - Amelia - Howry - Alabama - Beresford - Woodland - Volusia - Enterprise - Market Place Shopping Center (back Enterprise - Volusia - Woodland - Howry - ... - Northgate Shopping Center)	30		-	30		-	20
21		Deltona	Market Place Shopping Center - Enterprise - Deltona - Normandy - Providence - Lakeshore - Main - Jacob Brock - Providence - Fort Smith - Howland - Walamrt Osteen - Howland - Elkcam - Montecito - Newmark - Fort Smith - Providence - Eustace - Deltona Public Library (back Eustace - Providence - Normandy - Deltona - Enterprise - Market Place Shopping Center	60	120	-	60	120	-	21
22		Deltona	Market Place Shopping Center - Enterprise - Deltona - Normandy - Providence - Eustace - Deltona Public Library (back Eustace - Providence - Elkcam - Howland - Walmart Osteen - Howland - Fort Smith - Providence - Jacob Brock - Main - Lakeshore - Providence - Normandy - Deltona - Enterprise - Market Place Shopping Center)	60	120	-	60	120	-	22
23		Orange City	DeBary City Hall - Charles Beall - Saxon - Market Place Shopping Center - Enterprise - Harley Stickland - Veterans Memorial - Saxon - Tivoli - Fort Smith - Elkcam - Normandy - Saxon - ... - DeBary City Hall	60		-	60		-	23
24		Pierson - Seville	Northgate Shopping Center - Spring Garden - DeLeon Springs - Pierson - Seville - Border of Volusia County	3 trips		-	3 trips		-	24
31		SunRail - U.S. 17-92	Northgate Shopping Center - Woodland - Volusia - Charles Beall - DeBary SunRail Station	(~30)		-	-		-	31
33		SunRail - Deltona Plaza	Deltona Plaza - Deltona - Normandy - Saxon - Veterans Memorial - Harley Strickland - Enterprise - Saxon - Charles Beall - DeBary SunRail Station	(~60)		-	-		-	32
33		SunRail - Dupont Lakes Express	Dupont Lakes Shopping Center - Howland - Providence - Tivoli - Saxon - Veterans Memorial - Harley Strickland - Enterprise - Saxon - Charles Beall - DeBary SunRail Station	(~60)		-	-		-	33
40		Port Orange	Old Fort Park - Washington - Ridgewood - Nova - Swallow Drive (back Dunlawton - Ridgewood - ... - Old Fort Park)	60		-	60		-	40
41		Edgewater	Old Fort Park - Washington - Ridgewood ( - 10th - Daytona State College South Campus - 10th ) - Ridgewood - Oak Hille (back Ridgewood - Roberts - 30th - Willow Oak - Indian River - Ridgewood - ... - Old Fort Park	60		-	60		-	41
42		Beachside	Flex Area Route serving eastern New Smyrna Beach, with scheduled stops at Old Fort Park and Indian River Village Shopping Center	60		-	60		-	42; 43; 44
43		Mainland	Flex Area Route serving western New Smyrna Beach, with scheduled stops at Old Fort Park and NSB Regional Shopping Center	60		-	60		-	42; 43; 44
443		NSB to Walmart	Flex Area Route serving western New Smyrna Beach, with scheduled stops at Old Fort Park and NSB - Walmart	60		-	60		-	42; 43; 44
60		East West Connector	VTP - International Speedway - Northgate Shopping Center	30		-	30		-	60

== Fleet ==
Votran utilizes a fleet consisting mostly of 35' Gillig Low Floor transit buses, with two 29' models. Most of the agency's buses are diesel powered, with some being diesel-electric hybrids. The oldest buses were manufactured in 2012 and are slated for retirement during the course of the next couple of years.

The fleet for the New Smyrna Beach Flex and paratransit (Gold) services consists of various model cutaway vans.

Active

Year	Builder/Model	Picture	Numbers	Length (feet)	Fuel type	Notes
2012	Gillig Low Floor		2001-2006	35	Diesel-Electric Hybrid	
2013	Gillig Low Floor		2101-2104	35	Diesel-Electric Hybrid	
2014	Gillig Low Floor		2201-2209	35	Diesel	
2015	Gillig Low Floor		2301-2311	35	Diesel	
2016	Gillig Low Floor		2401-2404	35	Diesel	
2018	Gillig Low Floor		2501-2505	35	Diesel	
2019	Gillig Low Floor		2601-2606, 2608–2611	35	Diesel	
2020	Gillig Low Floor		2701-2707	35	Diesel	
2023	Gillig Low Floor		2801-2804	35	Diesel	Currently on order

Retired

PHOTO	FLEET NUMBERS	YEAR	MAKE	MODEL	LENGTH	POWERTRAIN	HEADSIGN	FAREBOX	NUMBER IN SERVICE	NOTES
	1301-1303	2003	GILLIG	PHANTOM C20B102N4	35'	DETROIT DIESEL SERIES 50 EGR ALLISON B400R	LUMINATOR TWINVISON AMBER LED	GENFARE TRANSVIEW	3	Rarely used in Revenue.
	2607	2007	Gillig	Low Floor	35'	Cummins (model unknown)	Allison (model unknown)		Retired following an accident on 6/28/2021 that resulted in a fire.	
