= Volusia Mall =

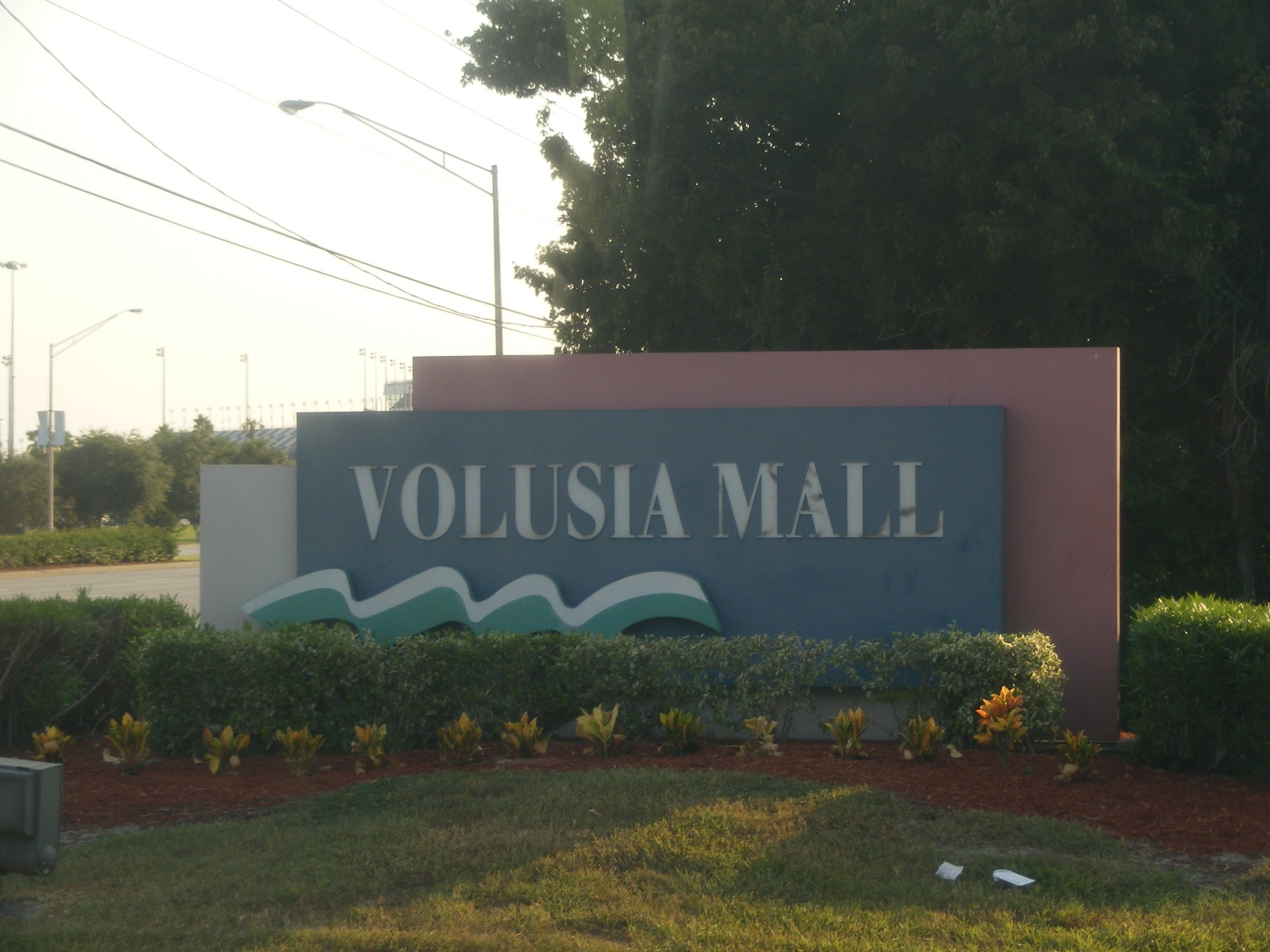
- Entrance sign from Highway 92
- Location: Daytona Beach, Florida, United States
- Coordinates: 29.197014°N 81.063737°W
- Opened: October 14, 1974; 52 years ago
- Developer: Edward J. DeBartolo Corporation
- Manager: CBL & Associates Properties, Inc.
- Owner: CBL & Associates Properties, Inc.
- Num. of stores: 120
- Num. of anchor tenants: 6 (4 open, 2 vacant)
- Floor area: 1,060,283 sq ft (98,504 m^{2})
- Floors: 1 (2 in all anchors except JCPenney)
- Public transit: Votran bus: 10, 11, 18, 19
- Website: www.volusiamall.net
- Information from CBL Properties and The Daytona Beach News-Journal

Volusia Mall is a super-regional shopping mall located in Daytona Beach, Florida. It is the largest retail shopping center in the Volusia-Flagler market. Opened on October 14, 1974, the mall comprises more than 120 stores on one level, as well as a food court. Anchor stores are JCPenney and three Dillard's locations. The mall is owned and managed by CBL & Associates Properties.

== History ==
Volusia Mall opened in 1974 at a 93-acre (38 ha) site on U.S. Highway 92, adjacent to I-95 and U.S. 1. It was originally built with Ivey's, May-Cohens, and Sears just like at Orange Park Mall a year later, but also started out with a JCPenney. Ivey's opened with the mall, in October 1974. May-Cohens came online in December. Sears was the next to open, in February 1975, followed by JCPenney, in August 1975. Like Coastland Center, all of the anchors except for JCPenney were built as two-level stores.

The first expansion of Volusia Mall was completed in March 1982, when two-level Burdines and Belk-Lindsey stores were added to the existing structure.

Shortly after May Cohen's changed to May Florida in 1987, the chain was acquired by Maison Blanche a year later. This store in turn was taken over by Fairfield, Ohio-based Mercantile Stores in early 1992, thus converting to Gayfers. Dillard's purchased Ivey's in June 1990, followed by Belk-Lindsey in November 1996, and Gayfers in late 1998 as their parent Mercantile was bought out. These made the mall the first (and only) mall in the entire country to have three separate Dillard's stores, with the former Ivey's housing women's departments, the former Belk-Lindsey housing men's and home departments, and the former May-Cohen's/May Florida/Maison Blanche/Gayfers housing juniors and children's departments. Burdines was dual-branded as Burdines-Macy's in 2003, and simply Macy's in 2005.

Original tenants in Volusia Mall included a Walgreens pharmacy and a tri-screen movie theater. After Walgreens relocated outside the mall, its space was converted to another mall entrance, while the theater became a storefront church. Center court housed a large fountain and wishing well a couple hundred feet in size. The structure featured multiple geysers as well as a jogging path and was also used to stage special events. This feature was downsized in 1997. The Volusia Mall is the largest mall in the Daytona Beach area.

On December 28, 2018, it was announced that Sears would be closing as part of a plan to close 80 stores nationwide. The store closed on March 10, 2019 . On April 22, 2019, Transform Saleco LLC purchased the Sears building for $5.9 million. It is unknown what is planned for the future of the former Sears.

On January 6, 2021, it was announced that Macy's would also be closing as part of a plan to close 46 stores nationwide. The store closed on March 21, 2021.

In January 2023, it was announced that Legacy Partners had acquired the former Macy's store and land, and had plans to redevelop it into luxury apartments called Legacy Daytona. The proposed development would include a four story gated apartment complex with 350 units. Amenities are to include a sky lounge, outdoor living room, detached garages, a fitness center, and a heated saltwater pool. The complex has not broken ground yet, but has an expected opening date of Spring 2026.

In 2026, Mr. Dunderback's, a Bavarian restaurant left the mall after 50 years.

== Transport ==
Votran routes 10, 11, 18, and 19 serve the mall from Monday to Saturday during daylight hours (except those days that fall on holidays). Votran Night Service Route 10 serves the mall at night from Monday to Saturday with a limited schedule on Sundays and holidays.
