= Longwood station (SunRail) =

Railway station in Florida

Longwood
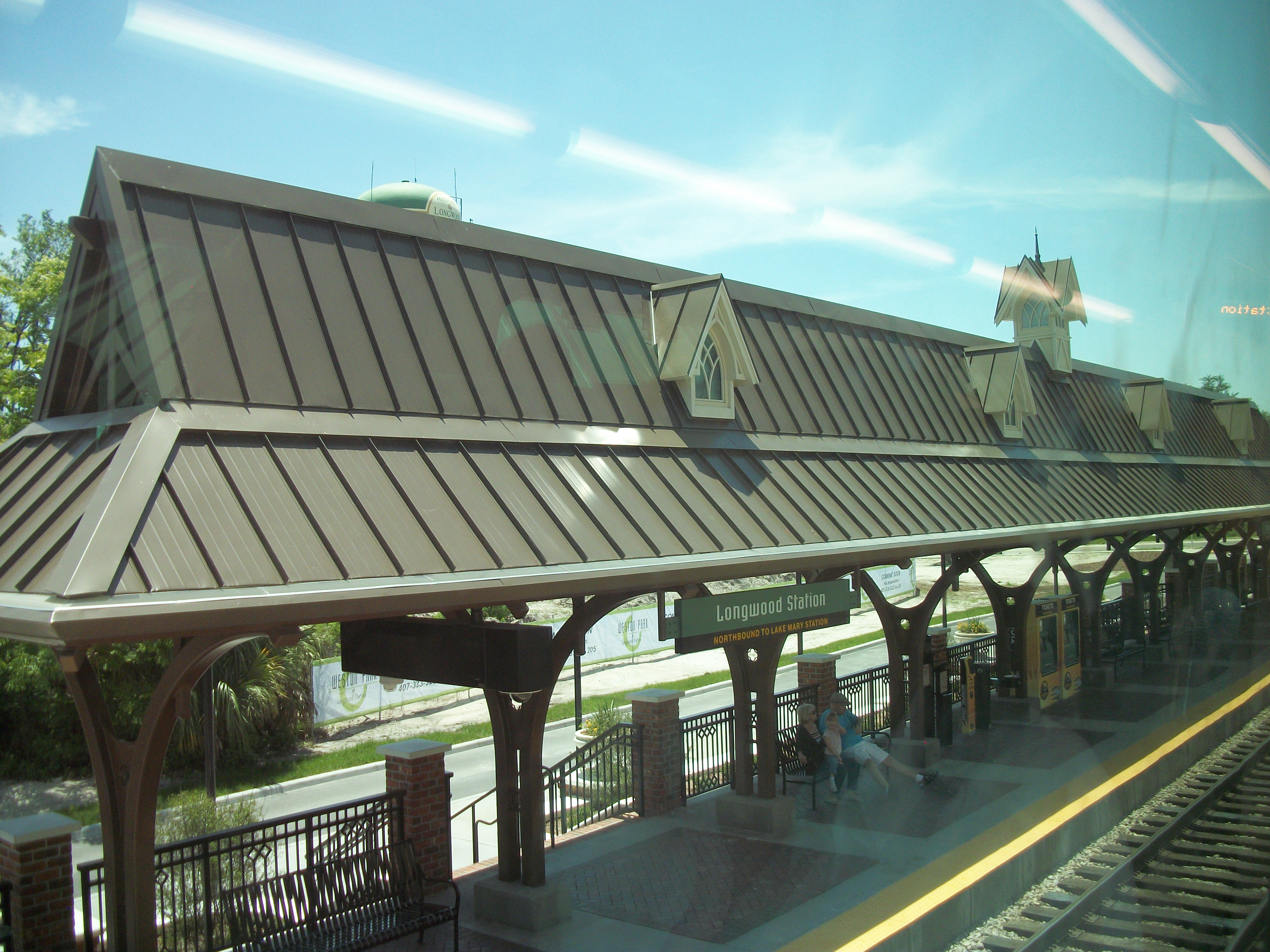
- The atypical northbound platform of Longwood as seen from the second level of a SunRail passenger car.

General information
- Location: 149 East Church Avenue; Longwood, Florida
- Coordinates: 28°42′05″N 81°20′43″W
- Owner: Florida Department of Transportation
- Platforms: 2 side platforms
- Tracks: 2
- Connections: Scout

Construction
- Structure type: At-grade
- Parking: 260 spaces
- Cycle facilities: Yes
- Accessible: Yes

Other information
- Fare zone: SunRail: Seminole; Scout: Howell

History
- Opened: May 1, 2014

Passengers
- FY2026: 53,849 ▲2.2%

Services
Preceding station	SunRail	Following station
Altamonte Springs toward Poinciana	SunRail	Lake Mary toward DeLand
Location

Longwood station is a train station in Longwood, Florida, served by SunRail, the commuter train of Central Florida. The station opened May 1, 2014, and marks a return of passenger rail service in Longwood dating back to the community's days as a junction of the South Florida Railroad, Orange Belt Railway and old Florida Midland Railway, all of which were acquired by the Atlantic Coast Line Railroad.

Unlike most SunRail stations, which feature canopies consisting of white aluminum poles supporting sloped green roofs, Longwood's canopies have traditional brown gabled roofs with cupolas and faux dormer windows. It also includes ticket vending machines, ticket validators, emergency call boxes, drinking fountains, separate platforms designed for passengers in wheelchairs. The station is located along the former CSX A-Line (originally constructed by the South Florida Railroad) northeast of the Longwood Historic District on the north side of East Church Avenue. The northbound platforms run along John L. Mica Way, with passenger drop-off areas at the north and south ends of the station. A transit-oriented development called Weston Park was built adjacent to the station, which features a 208-unit, four story luxury apartment community.
