= Sanford station (SunRail) =

Rail station in Sanford, Florida

Sanford
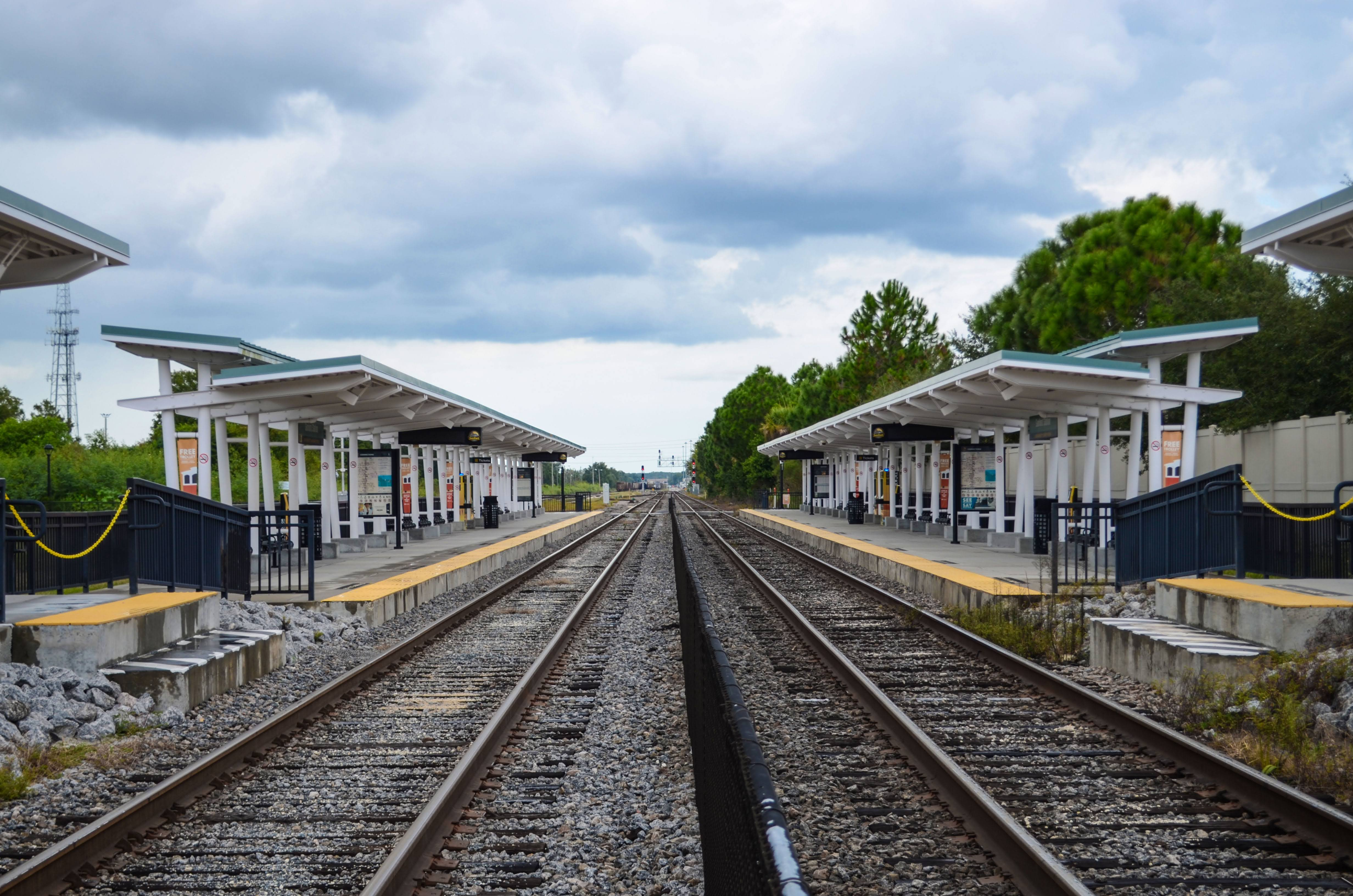
- Looking northwest at Sanford SunRail station from the southernmost pedestrian crossing.

General information
- Location: 2720 West State Road 46; Sanford, Florida
- Coordinates: 28°48′47″N 81°17′55″W
- Owner: Florida Department of Transportation
- Platforms: 2 side platforms
- Tracks: 5
- Connections: Sanford trolley Scout

Construction
- Structure type: At-grade
- Parking: 232 spaces
- Cycle facilities: Yes
- Accessible: Yes

Other information
- Fare zone: SunRail: Seminole; Scout: Monroe

History
- Opened: May 1, 2014

Passengers
- FY2026: 64,718 ▲3.2%

Services
Preceding station	SunRail	Following station
Lake Mary toward Poinciana	SunRail	DeBary toward DeLand
Location

Sanford station is a SunRail commuter rail station in Sanford, Florida. It is the penultimate station in SunRail's phase one. It opened May 1, 2014, and marks the nine-year return of regular passenger rail service to Sanford following the closure of the Amtrak station in 2005. Sanford station is the northernmost SunRail station within Seminole County.

Sanford is typical of most SunRail stations featuring canopies consisting of white aluminum poles supporting sloped green roofs and includes ticket vending machines, ticket validators, emergency call boxes, drinking fountains, and separate platforms designed for passengers in wheelchairs. The station is located along the north side of S.R. 46, diagonally across the road from the Sanford Amtrak Auto Train station. Other Amtrak trains that share the right-of-way with SunRail are the Silver Meteor and Silver Star trains, neither of which stop at either Sanford station. The station is also located just south of Rand Yard, a small rail yard used by CSX for freight car storage as well as SunRail for equipment maintenance and storage.

As of 2026, the station has the highest ridership of all SunRail stations in Seminole County, with 64,718 riders in the most recent fiscal year.

== History ==
The Sanford station was built along tracks originally laid down by the Jacksonville, Tampa and Key West Railroad, which was acquired by the Plant System, and later by the Atlantic Coast Line Railroad (ACL). Sanford's ACL Depot, however, was built along the tracks used by the South Florida Railroad, which was also acquired by the Plant System and later acquired by ACL. The original station was built by the ACL in 1913, and a new modern station replaced the original depot in 1953. As with many ACL Depots, it became a Seaboard Coast Line Railroad station when the ACL merged with the Seaboard Air Line Railroad in 1967. Like most passenger stations, it was acquired by Amtrak upon its inception in April 1971. In December of that same year, the Auto-Train Corporation built a terminal for its operations nearby. Auto-Train took passengers and their cars and other vehicles to Lorton, Virginia, and later Louisville, Kentucky. Lack of success from the Louisville expansion, high crew costs and several accidents threw the company into bankruptcy, and Auto-Train Corporation was forced to end its services in late April 1981. Amtrak acquired Auto Train in 1983, and still operates this service between Sanford and Lorton today.

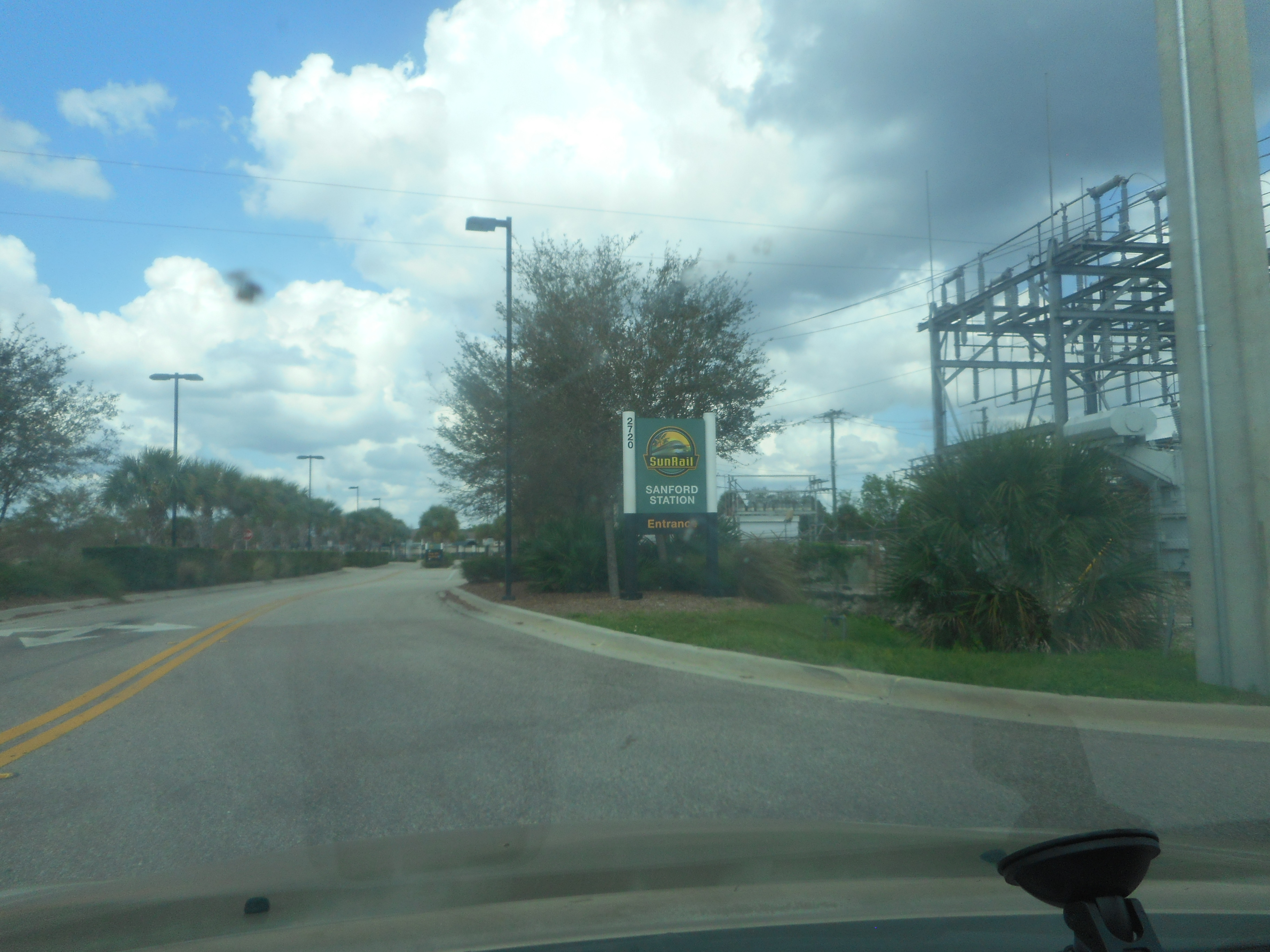
Entrance to the SunRail station off of US 17-92-FL 46.

In its waning years, the former ACL depot served the Silver Star, Silver Meteor, and Sunset Limited until Amtrak closed the station on August 1, 2005, leaving Auto Train as the only passenger service to serve Sanford. The abandoned 1953-era ACL station deteriorated through the years and was eventually demolished in 2009. In the meantime, the Central Florida Commuter Rail agency vowed to return passenger service to Sanford, and on May 1, 2014, the Sanford SunRail station was opened to the public.

There is a trolley-replica bus between the station and Downtown Sanford.
