= Braden Mann =

American football player (born 1997)

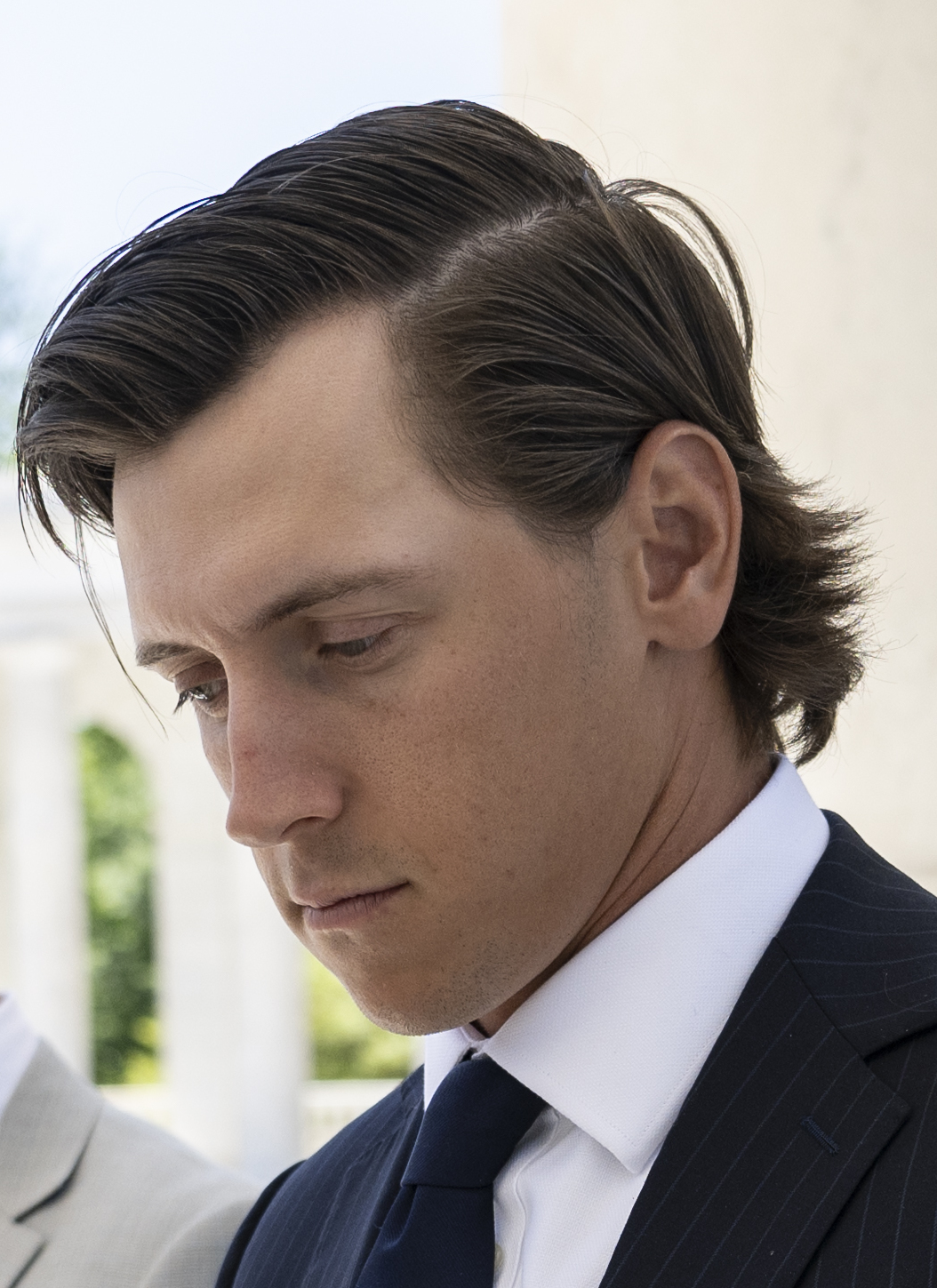
- Mann in 2025

No. 10 – Philadelphia Eagles
- Position: Punter
- Roster status: Active

Personal information
- Born: November 24, 1997 (age 28); Houston, Texas, U.S.
- Listed height: 5 ft 11 in (1.80 m)
- Listed weight: 198 lb (90 kg)

Career information
- High school: Cy-Fair (Cypress, Texas)
- College: Texas A&M (2016–2019)
- NFL draft: 2020: 6th round, 191st overall pick

Career history
- New York Jets (2020–2022); Pittsburgh Steelers (2023)*; Philadelphia Eagles (2023–present)
- * Offseason or practice squad member only

Awards and highlights
- Super Bowl champion (LIX); NFL punting yards leader (2020); Ray Guy Award (2018); Unanimous All-American (2018); SEC Special Teams Player of the Year (2018); 2× First-team All-SEC (2018, 2019)

Career NFL statistics as of Week 9, 2026
- Punts: 425
- Punting yards: 20,105
- Punting average: 47.3
- Longest punt: 86
- Inside 20: 137
- Stats at Pro Football Reference

Braden Mann (born November 24, 1997) is an American professional football punter for the Philadelphia Eagles of the National Football League (NFL). He played college football for the Texas A&M Aggies. During his junior season, he received unanimous All-American honors and won the Ray Guy Award. He also broke the NCAA Division I Football Bowl Subdivision (FBS) records for single-game punting average, single-season punts of 60-plus yards and single-season punting average.

== Early life ==
Mann played kicker and punter at Cy-Fair High School in Cypress, Texas, under the tutelage of head coach Ed Pustejovsky, a former Texas A&M football player. As a junior, Mann scored 7-of-10 field goals (with a long of 49 yards) and 46-of-48 extra points. He was named to the 2014 Houston Chronicle All-Greater Houston team. As a senior, he scored 25-of-25 extra points and recorded a 45-yard punting average on 41 punts. Following his senior season, Mann played in the Under Armour All-America Game.

Though Mann wanted to play linebacker in high school and college, he was not able to do so due to his size and injuries. As a college football recruit, he was rated nationally as the number two kicker by Rivals.com and the number five kicker by 247Sports.com.

== College career ==
Mann was primarily the kickoff specialist during his first two years at Texas A&M. During his freshman season, he averaged 63.9 yards on 76 kickoffs, and as a sophomore, he averaged 62.4 yards on 73 kickoffs. He was not the starting punter during his freshman year and only punted the ball twice during the season (two punts for 94 yards, or a 47.0 average). As a sophomore, he did not punt at all and made only one kicking attempt, which came when he missed a 43-yard field goal try in the season-opening 44–45 loss to UCLA.

Following the graduation of veteran punter Shane Tripucka, Mann became the starting punter during the 2018 season, and made an immediate impact on the team. During the Alabama game, he broke the NCAA football bowl subdivision single-game record with a 60.8 punting average. The previous record of 60.4 was set in 1983 and matched in 2010. During the Kentucky game, he recorded an 82-yard punt, which in Texas A&M punt history was the third-longest and longest since 1944. After the first six games, in October 2018, Mann received midseason All-America honors from the Associated Press, Athlon Sports, Sporting News, Sports Illustrated, CBS Sports, USA Today, and ESPN. He also received praise from former NFL punter and pro bowler Pat McAfee.

Mann continued to receive recognition for the remainder of his junior season. During the November 2018 game against University of Alabama at Birmingham, he made his 14th punt of 60 or more yards breaking the NCAA FBS single-season record set in 2005 by former Wake Forest punter Ryan Plackemeier. Following the regular season, Mann received first-team all-SEC honors from the league's coaches and the Associated Press and was also named the SEC Special Teams Player of the Year. He picked up first team All-America honors from the Associated Press (AP), American Football Coaches Association (AFCA), Athlon Sports, CBS Sports, ESPN, Football Writers Association of America (FWAA), Sporting News, Sports Illustrated, Bleacher Report, College Football News, USA Today, and Walter Camp Football Foundation (WCFF). Since he earned All-America honors from all five NCAA-recognized selectors (AP, AFCA, FWAA, Sporting News, and WCFF), he became the 10th unanimous All-American from Texas A&M. He also won the Ray Guy Award as the nation's top collegiate punter.

Mann led the nation with his season punting average of 50.98 yards per punt. He broke the single-season punting average record of 50.28 set in 1997 by former LSU punter Chad Kessler.

== Professional career ==
Pre-draft measurables
Height	Weight	Arm length	Hand span	Wingspan	40-yard dash	10-yard split	20-yard split	20-yard shuttle	Three-cone drill	Vertical jump	Broad jump
5 ft 11 3/8 in (1.81 m)	198 lb (90 kg)	30 in (0.76 m)	9 1/4 in (0.23 m)	6 ft 1 7/8 in (1.88 m)	4.83 s	1.70 s	2.82 s	4.13 s	7.03 s	31.0 in (0.79 m)	9 ft 3 in (2.82 m)
All values from NFL Combine

=== New York Jets ===
Mann was drafted by the New York Jets in the sixth round with the 191st overall pick in the 2020 NFL draft.

During the game against the Los Angeles Rams, Mann made a game-saving, open-field tackle on punt returner Nsimba Webster that helped seal the Jets' 23–20 victory. The Jets finished the season 2–14. Mann compiled 3,598 total yards, with a 43.9 punting average. His 3,598 total yards made him the 2020 NFL punting yards leader.

On September 14, 2021, Mann was placed on injured reserve. He was activated on November 13.

In Week 2 of the 2022 season, Mann had two punts inside the 20 with a long of 50 yards. He also had a 17-yard completion and had a successful onside kick in a 31–30 win over the Cleveland Browns, earning AFC Special Teams Player of the Week.

On April 13, 2023, Mann was waived by the New York Jets.

=== Pittsburgh Steelers ===
On April 17, 2023, Mann was claimed off waivers by the Pittsburgh Steelers. On August 30, Mann was waived by the Steelers.

=== Philadelphia Eagles ===
On September 18, 2023, Mann signed with the practice squad of the Philadelphia Eagles. He was promoted to the active roster on October 12. On December 11, Mann faked a punt and threw a 28-yard completion to WR Olamide Zaccheaus in a 13–33 loss to the Dallas Cowboys.

On March 12, 2024, Mann signed a two-year contract extension with the Eagles. He was named NFC Special Teams Player of the Week following a 24–19 win over the Baltimore Ravens in Week 13. Mann won his first Super Bowl when the Eagles defeated the Kansas City Chiefs, 40–22, in Super Bowl LIX. He punted twice in the game.

On March 13, 2026, Mann signed a four-year, $14 million contract extension with the Eagles. On November 8, 2026, Mann punted 8 times for a 48-yard average; including an 86-yard punt, the longest punt in the NFL since 2001.

== NFL career statistics ==
Legend
	Led the league
	Won the Super Bowl
**Bold**	Career high

=== Regular season ===
Year	Team	GP	Punting						
Year	Team	GP	Punts	Yds	Lng	Avg	Blk	Ins20	RetY
2020	NYJ	16	82	3,598	60	43.9	0	19	**446**
2021	NYJ	10	41	1,875	63	45.7	**1**	14	151
2022	NYJ	**17**	**83**	**3,889**	72	46.9	0	**27**	363
2023	PHI	15	44	2,190	63	49.8	0	15	244
2024	PHI	**17**	54	2,633	70	48.8	**1**	20	183
2025	PHI	**17**	72	3,591	70	**49.9**	0	20	350
2026	PHI	9	49	2,329	**86**	47.5	0	22	202
Career		70	425	19,721	69	47.3	2	135	1,939

=== Postseason ===
Year	Team	GP	Punting						
Year	Team	GP	Punts	Yds	Lng	Avg	Blk	Ins20	RetY
2023	PHI	1	4	188	57	47.0	0	0	24
2024	PHI	**4**	**13**	**621**	**63**	47.8	0	**6**	**52**
2025	PHI	1	4	208	58	**52.0**	0	1	12
Career		6	21	1,017	63	48.4	0	7	88
