= DeBary station =

Railway station in DeBary, Florida, United States

DeBary
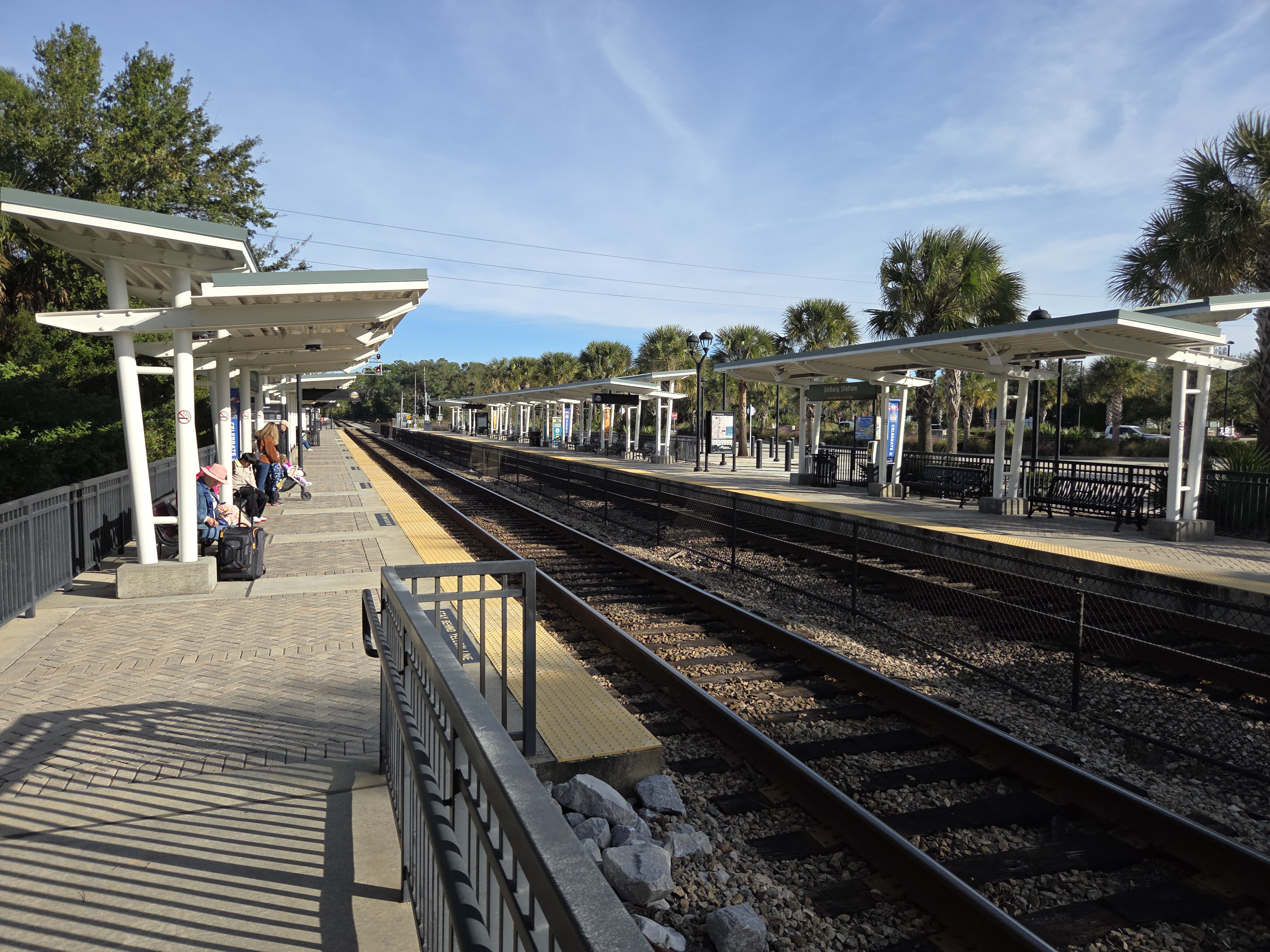
- Platforms at DeBary

General information
- Location: 630 South Charles R. Beall Boulevard; DeBary, Florida
- Coordinates: 28°51′20″N 81°19′22″W
- Owner: Florida Department of Transportation
- Platforms: 2 side platforms
- Tracks: 2
- Connections: Votran: 30, 31, 32, 33

Construction
- Structure type: At-grade
- Parking: 275 spaces
- Cycle facilities: Yes
- Accessible: Yes

Other information
- Fare zone: Volusia

History
- Opened: May 1, 2014

Passengers
- FY2026: 74,185 ▼2.8%

Services
Preceding station	SunRail	Following station
Sanford toward Poinciana	SunRail	DeLand Terminus
Location

DeBary station is a train station in DeBary, Florida. The station opened May 1, 2014, and marks the return of passenger rail service to the DeBary area, which previously operated from Benson Junction further to the north. The station was the original northern terminus of SunRail until Phase 2 North expansion to the DeLand Amtrak station was completed in August 2024.

DeBary is typical of most SunRail stations featuring canopies consisting of white aluminum poles supporting sloped green roofs and includes ticket vending machines, ticket validators, emergency call boxes, drinking fountains, and separate platforms designed for passengers in wheelchairs. The station is located along the former CSX A-Line (originally constructed by the Jacksonville, Tampa and Key West Railway) along the west side of US 17/92 just north of the Lake Monroe drawbridge. Due to ridership of over 10,000 on the first two days of service, the parking facilities quickly filled up leading Volusia County to start two free shuttle services, one from nearby Gemini Springs Park and another from Deltona Plaza at 1200 Deltona Blvd, Deltona. The free shuttles ended on May 16, 2014, coinciding with the end of free Sunrail service. Regular Votran bus routes 30, 31, 32, and 33 continue to serve the DeBary station. A transit-oriented development called Integra 289 Exchange, which will feature a four-story, 289-unit luxury apartment community, is currently planned to be built adjacent to the station.
