= Pace Brantley Preparatory School =

Location
- 3221 Sand Lake Road; Longwood, Florida; United States; 28.6791°N 81.4445°W

Information
- Type: Special education
- Established: 1972
- Director: Pam Tapley
- Teaching staff: 28 (on an FTE basis)
- Grades: 1 to 12
- Enrollment: 152 (2019-20)
- Student to teacher ratio: 5.4
- Hours in school day: 8:30 - 3:25(8:30 - 2:25 on Wednesdays)
- Colors: Blue and White
- Mascot: Eagle
- Nickname: PACE
- Team name: Eagles
- Tuition: Elementary School: $18,510 Middle School: $18,680 High School: $18,959
- Website: pacebrantley.org

Pace Brantley Preparatory School, formerly known as PACE-Brantley Hall School, is a private school in Longwood, Florida specializing in teaching students with attention-deficit hyperactivity disorder, obsessive–compulsive disorder, dyslexia, autism spectrum disorder, and other learning disabilities.

== History ==
Pace Brantley Preparatory School was founded in 1972 by Mary E. Dunn, an advocate in assisting the learning of students with disabilities. At first, the school had seven students and two teachers, and it met in a church on weekdays. Since then, the school has grown to a wooded, 8-acre (32,000 m^{2}) campus with eight buildings. In 2022, the school changed its name to Pace Brantley Preparatory.
