= South Seminole Hospital =

Coordinates: 28.6990266°N 81.3526602°W

Orlando Health South Seminole Hospital
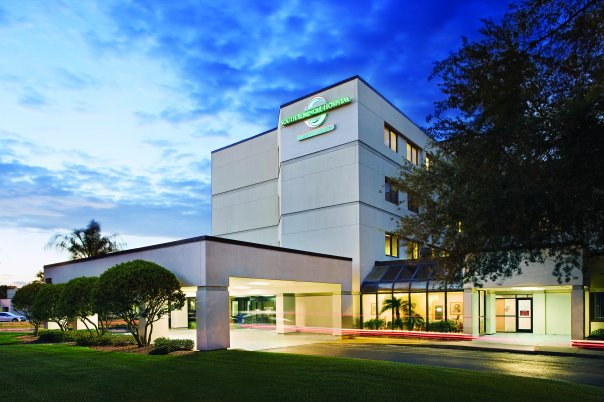
- Logo of the South Seminole Hospital and the view of the facility

Geography
- Location: Longwood, Florida, United States

Organization
- Care system: Private, Not-for-Profit
- Type: Community Hospital

Services
- Beds: 206

History
- Opened: 1984
- Closed: January 11, 2025

Links
- Website: Official website
- Lists: Hospitals in Florida

Orlando Health South Seminole Hospital was a 206-bed, medical/surgical community hospital located in Longwood, Florida, United States owned by Orlando Health.

== History ==
On September 15, 2022, Orlando Health announced that it would have Orlando Health South Seminole Hospital, demolished and have it replaced with a 12,000-square-foot freestanding emergency department. In April 2024, construction began on the campus of the former hospital.

The hospital closed in 2025, being replaced by Lake Mary Hospital.
