= Longwood, Florida =

- City
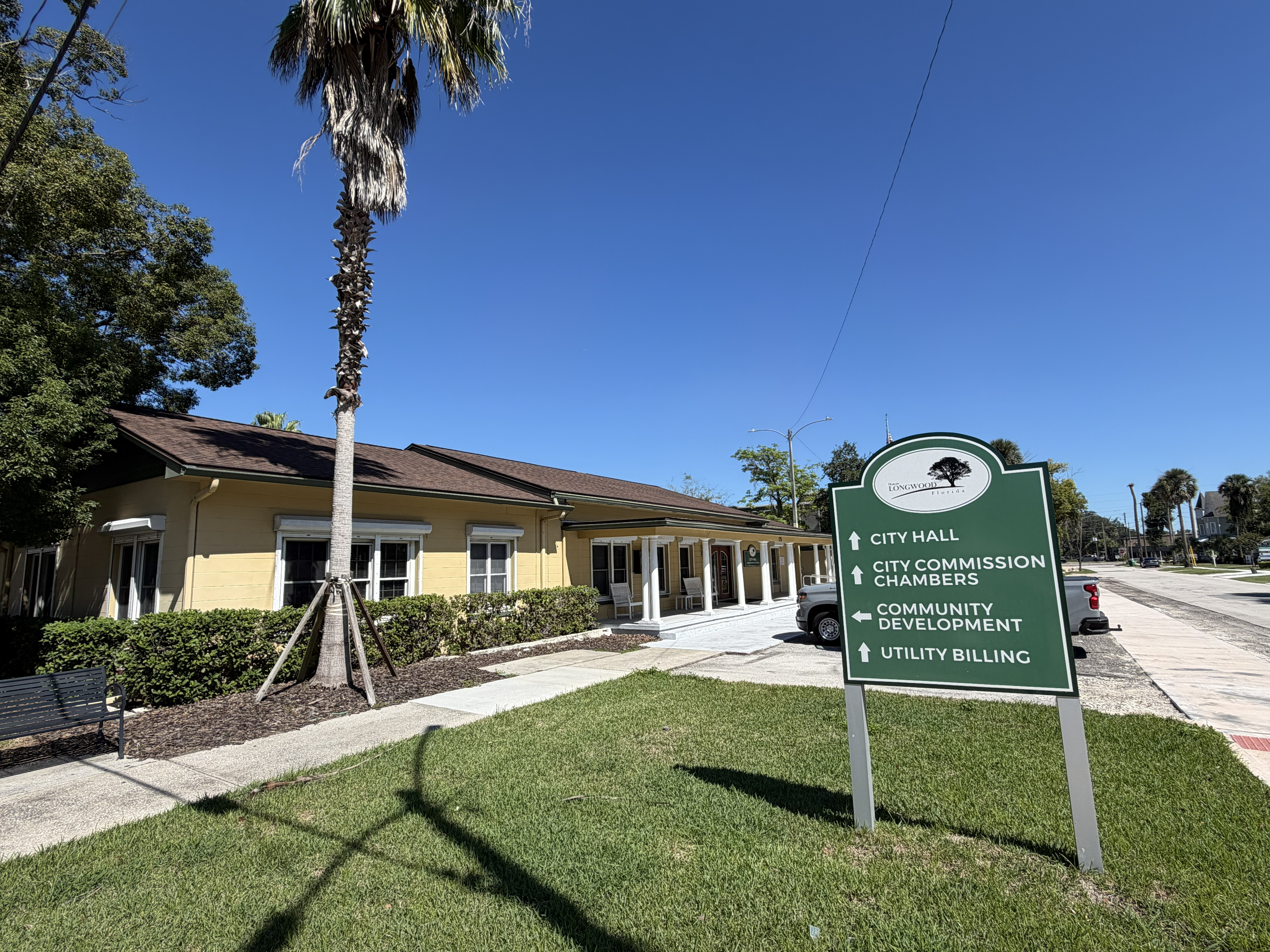
- Longwood City Hall

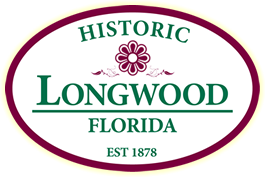
- Seal

- Location in Seminole County and the state of Florida
- Coordinates: 28°42′05″N 81°20′55″W
- Country: United States
- State: Florida
- County: Seminole
- Established: 1878

Government
  - Type: Mayor–Commission

Area
  - City: 5.86 sq mi (15.17 km^{2})
  - Land: 5.51 sq mi (14.26 km^{2})
  - Water: 0.35 sq mi (0.91 km^{2})
- Elevation: 75 ft (23 m)

Population (2020)
  - City: 15,087
  - Density: 2,740.9/sq mi (1,058.26/km^{2})
  - Metro: 2,082,421
- Time zone: UTC-5 (EST)
  - Summer (DST): UTC-4 (EDT)
- ZIP codes: 32750-32779
- Area codes: 407, 689, 321
- FIPS code: 12-41250
- GNIS feature ID: 2404953
- Website: longwoodfl.org

Longwood is a city in Seminole County, Florida, United States. It is part of the Orlando–Kissimmee–Sanford, Florida Metropolitan Statistical Area. The population was 15,087 at the 2020 census.

== History ==
With the advent of World War II, growth began to affect Longwood as military personnel flowed into the new Naval Air Station Sanford to the north and Orlando Army Air Base to the south. By the 1950s, NAS Sanford was being converted into a Master Jet Base for carrier-based heavy attack aircraft and, along with the re-designated Orlando Air Force Base and nearby Pinecastle AFB (later renamed McCoy AFB), saw even more military families renting or purchasing homes in and around Longwood. In 1959, the city had slightly over 1,000 residents and a city limit boundary that measured approximately 1-by-1-mile (1.6 by 1.6 km) square. In 1960, Longwood Elementary School was constructed and opened inside the city limits.

During the 1950s and 1960s, the city also boasted its own airport, a single runway grass airstrip used mainly by private airplanes. Longwood Slade Airport was located on the west side of the city on the north side of State Road 434 until it was closed and developed into tract housing that became The Woodlands subdivision in the late 1960s, its entrance road being named Slade Drive.

New economic and development opportunities were brought to the area in the 1960s and 1970s, fueled by both the military and the space industry, as newly arriving Longwood residents were employed at Martin-Marietta's new missile plant in Orlando; Naval Air Station Sanford; Orlando Air Force Base (redesignated Naval Training Center Orlando in 1969); and McCoy Air Force Base in Orlando; as well as Cape Canaveral Air Force Station; Patrick Air Force Base; and the NASA John F. Kennedy Space Center in Brevard County. The development and opening of Walt Disney World in October 1971, along with other tourist attractions and the high technology corridor of businesses, especially those engaged in the modeling, simulation and training (MS&T) industry and associated military training systems activities near Florida Technological University (FTU), now the University of Central Florida (UCF), fueled even further growth.

Short-term economic downturns caused by the closure of NAS Sanford in 1968 and McCoy AFB in 1975 were offset with other economic growth across Central Florida during the 1970s and 1980s. As a result, Longwood developed into primarily a residential community for residents working elsewhere in Seminole County or in adjacent Orange County. By 2000, the city had taken significant steps to revitalize its downtown historic district, expanded its borders through annexation and in the process gained a resident population exceeding 13,700.

== Geography ==
According to the United States Census Bureau, the city has a total area of 5.6 square miles (15 km^{2}), of which 5.3 square miles (14 km^{2}) is land and 0.3 square miles (0.78 km^{2}) (5.17%) is water.

== Economy ==
=== Top employers ===
According to the city's 2023 Annual Comprehensive Financial Report, the top employers in the city are:

#	Employer	# of Employees	% of total city Employment
1	Orlando Health - South Seminole Hospital	1022	6.03%
2	Kustom	700	4.13%
3	UPS	653	3.85%
4	Comprehensive Energy Services	439	2.59%
5	D&B Building Services	349	2.06%
6	Collis Roofing	234	1.38%
7	S.I. Goldman	234	1.38%
8	Seminole County Schools	222	1.31%
9	Cascade Heights	202	1.19%
10	Criticom Management Resources, LLC	193	1.14%

== Demographics ==
Historical population
Census	Pop.	Note	%±
1890	57		—
1920	106		—
1930	318		200.0%
1940	406		27.7%
1950	717		76.6%
1960	1,689		135.6%
1970	3,203		89.6%
1980	10,029		213.1%
1990	13,316		32.8%
2000	13,745		3.2%
2010	13,657		−0.6%
2020	15,087		10.5%
U.S. Decennial Census

The United States Census Bureau estimated Longwood's population at 17,089 on July 1, 2024, a 13.2% increase from the 2020 estimates base.

=== Racial and ethnic composition ===
Longwood racial composition (Hispanics excluded from racial categories) (NH = Non-Hispanic)
Race	Pop 2010	Pop 2020	% 2010	% 2020
White (NH)	10,123	9,309	74.12%	61.70%
Black or African American (NH)	612	922	4.48%	6.11%
Native American or Alaska Native (NH)	47	26	0.34%	0.17%
Asian (NH)	448	652	3.28%	4.32%
Pacific Islander or Native Hawaiian (NH)	9	5	0.07%	0.03%
Some other race (NH)	44	101	0.32%	0.67%
Two or more races/Multiracial (NH)	222	648	1.63%	4.30%
Hispanic or Latino (any race)	2,152	3,424	15.76%	22.70%
Total	13,657	15,087	100.00%	100.00%

=== 2020 census ===
As of the 2020 census, Longwood had a population of 15,087. The median age was 42.5 years. 19.1% of residents were under the age of 18 and 21.6% of residents were 65 years of age or older. For every 100 females there were 90.4 males, and for every 100 females age 18 and over there were 86.6 males age 18 and over.

There were 5,665 households and 3,769 families in Longwood, of which 31.0% had children under the age of 18 living in them. Of all households, 46.2% were married-couple households, 17.2% were households with a male householder and no spouse or partner present, and 28.6% were households with a female householder and no spouse or partner present. About 24.7% of all households were made up of individuals and 10.1% had someone living alone who was 65 years of age or older.

There were 5,926 housing units, of which 4.4% were vacant. The homeowner vacancy rate was 1.7% and the rental vacancy rate was 5.2%.

100.0% of residents lived in urban areas, while 0.0% lived in rural areas.

=== 2010 census ===
As of the 2010 United States census, there were 13,657 people, 4,969 households, and 3,456 families residing in the city.

== Arts and culture ==
=== Points of interest ===
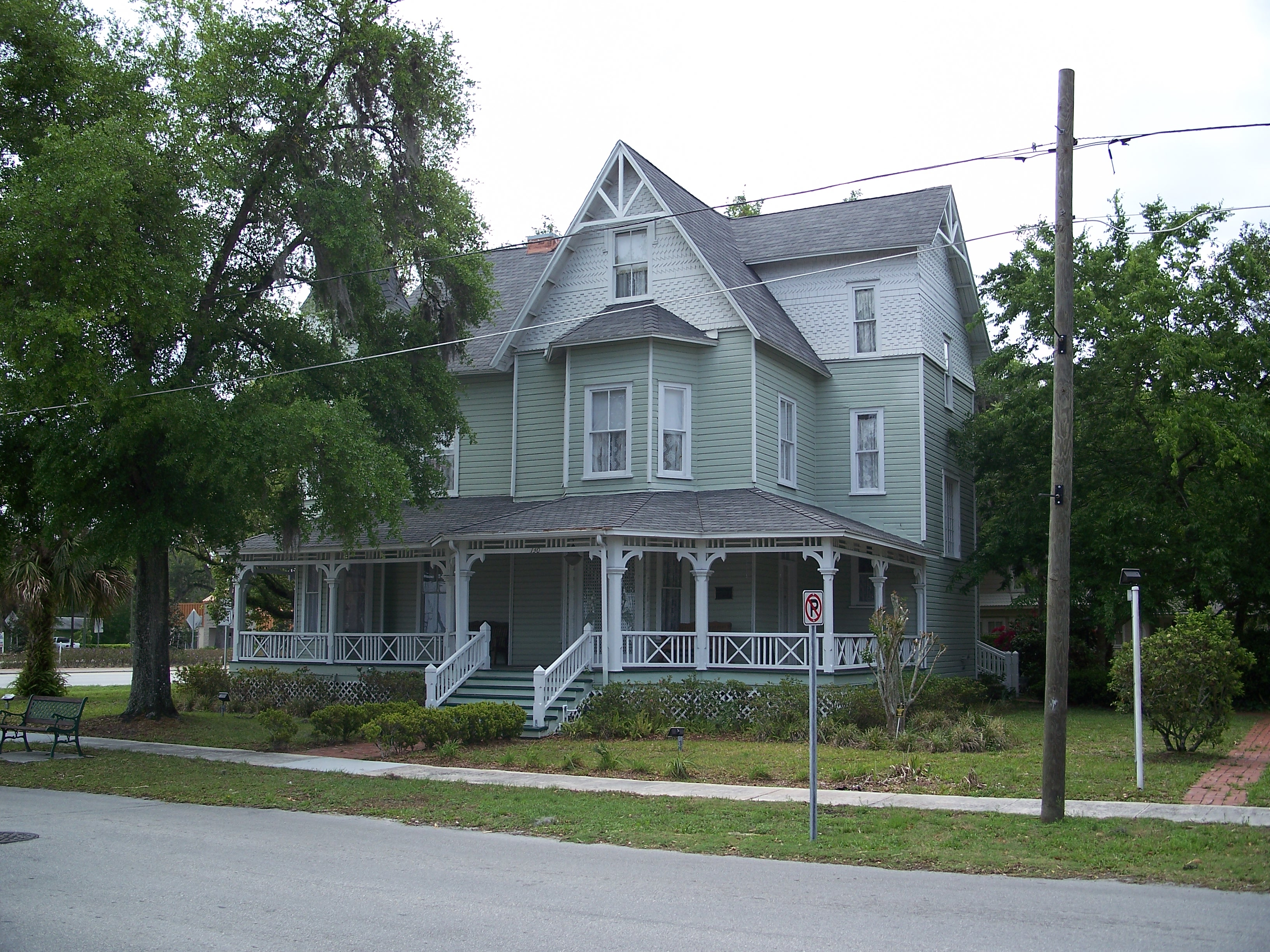
Bradlee-McIntyre House

- Bradlee-McIntyre House
- Lady Liberty tree
- Longwood Hotel
- Longwood Historic District
- Longwood (SunRail station)
- The Senator tree

== Education ==
The city of Longwood's public schools are a part of Seminole County Public Schools. Longwood contains four public elementary schools (K–5), two public middle schools (6–8), and one public high school (9–12). Two additional high schools are located outside of Longwood, but draw some students from within the city limits.

=== Elementary schools (public) ===
- Longwood Elementary School (closed in 2011, but reopened in the 2017–2018 school year)
- Sabal Point Elementary School
- Wekiva Elementary School
- Woodlands Elementary School

=== Middle schools (public) ===
- Greenwood Middle School (in Lake Mary)
- Milwee Middle School
- Rock Lake Middle School
- Teague Middle School (in Altamonte Springs)

=== High schools (public) ===
- Lake Brantley High School (in Altamonte Springs)
- Lake Mary High School (in Lake Mary)
- Lyman High School

=== Private Schools ===
- Pace Brantley Preparatory School

== Media ==
In 1965, the city served as a film site and backdrop, representing a fictional south Florida town adjacent to a Seminole Indian tribe reservation in the Universal Studios movie Johnny Tiger. Released in 1966, the movie starred Robert Taylor, Geraldine Brooks and Chad Everett.

== Infrastructure ==
=== Transportation ===
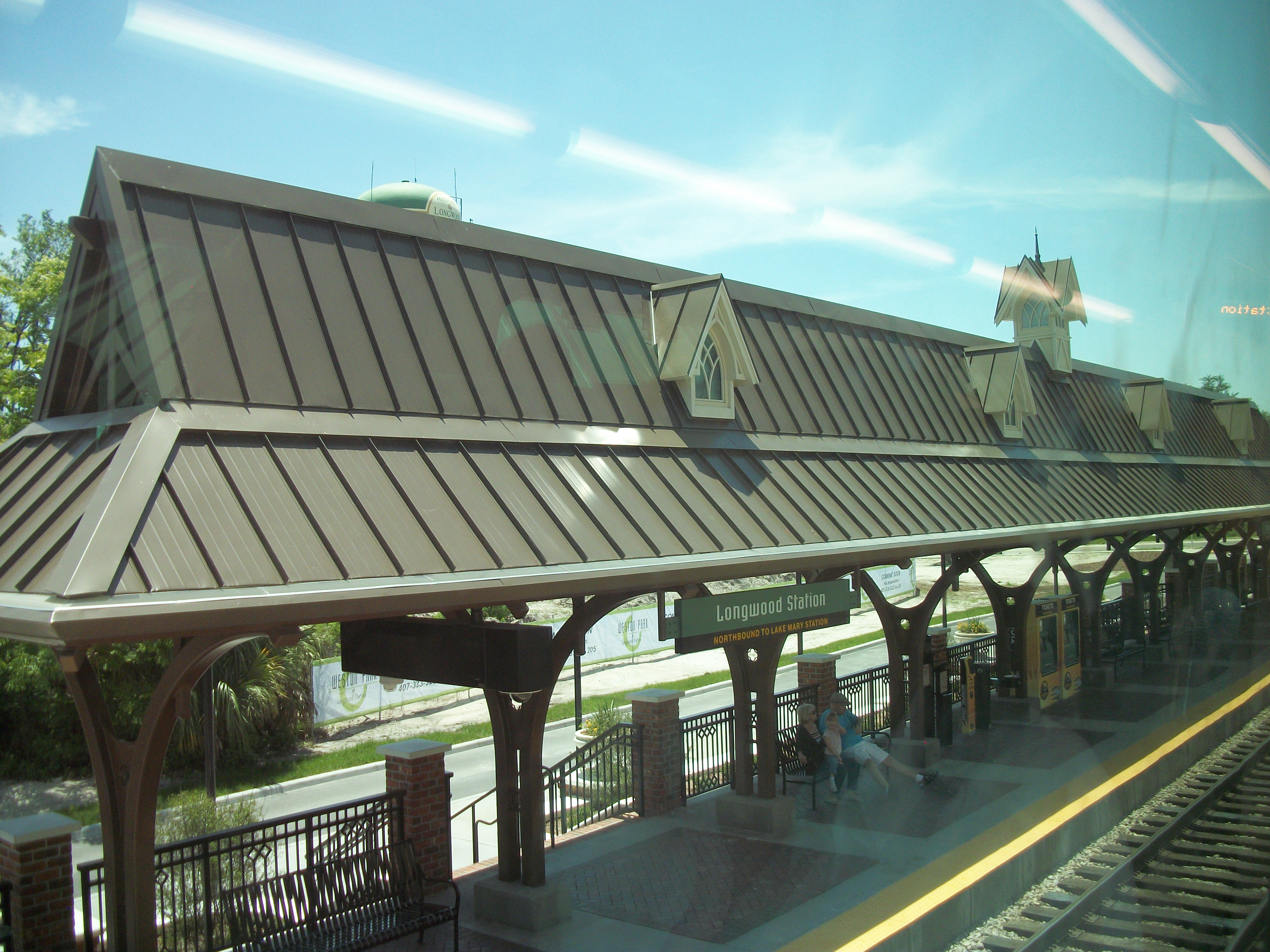
Longwood SunRail Station

==== Major roads ====
A small slice of Interstate 4 runs along the western city limits and includes a single exit for State Road 434, which bisects the city to its eastern boundary at US Highway 17/92.

- I-4 (Interstate 4)
- US 17 / US 92
- SR 434
- CR 427 (Ronald Reagan Boulevard)

==== Public transit ====
- Lynx
- SunRail

== Notable people ==
- Raymond Bernabei, soccer player and referee
- Jared Bernhardt, wide receiver for the Atlanta Falcons
- Bishop Clint S. Brown, gospel musician and pastor
- Rusty Day. a singer with the band Cactus
- Peter Demens, co-owner first mill, built Orange Belt Railroad, co-founded St. Petersburg
- Mandy Moore, singer, songwriter, actress and voice actress
- Matt Morgan, retired wrestler who performed for both WWE and TNA Wrestling, former mayor of Longwood.
- David Richardson, first openly gay member of Florida House of Representatives
- Josh Segarra, actor
- R.C. Sproul, theologian
- Phyllis Thaxter, actress
- Logan Warmoth, shortstop in the Toronto Blue Jays organization
- Graham Zusi, a United States men's national soccer team soccer player
