= Lake Mary station =

Station along Phase 1 of the SunRail commuter train

Lake Mary
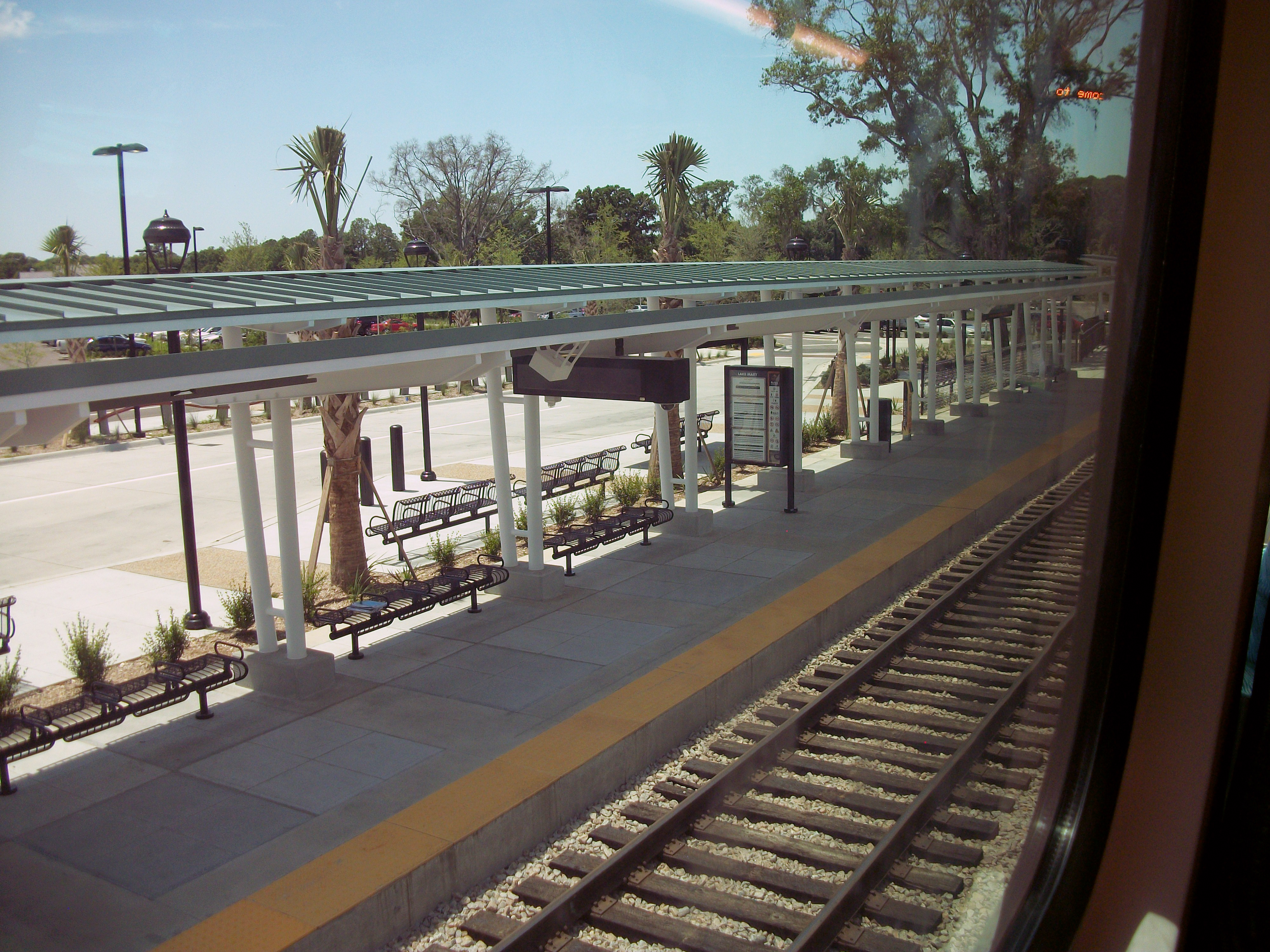
- View of the kiosks at the Lake Mary station from inside a SunRail passenger car in May 2014.

General information
- Location: 2200 West Lake Mary Boulevard; Lake Mary, Florida
- Coordinates: 28°45′31″N 81°19′06″W
- Owner: Florida Department of Transportation
- Platforms: 2 side platforms
- Tracks: 2
- Connections: Scout

Construction
- Structure type: At-grade
- Parking: 315 spaces
- Cycle facilities: Yes
- Accessible: Yes

Other information
- Fare zone: SunRail: Seminole; Scout: Lake Mary

History
- Opened: May 1, 2014

Passengers
- FY2026: 61,514 ▲8%

Services
Preceding station	SunRail	Following station
Longwood toward Poinciana	SunRail	Sanford toward DeLand
Location

Lake Mary station is a SunRail commuter rail station in Lake Mary, Florida. The station opened May 1, 2014, and marks a return of passenger rail service in Lake Mary dating back to the community's days as a station stop along the Atlantic Coast Line Railroad Main Line. It is the northernmost SunRail station along the former South Florida Railroad Main Line, although not the northernmost station within Seminole County or the system.

Lake Mary is typical of most SunRail stations featuring canopies consisting of white aluminum poles supporting sloped green roofs and includes ticket vending machines, ticket validators, emergency call boxes, drinking fountains, and separate platforms designed for passengers in wheelchairs. The station is located along the former CSX A-Line (originally constructed by the South Florida Railroad) near West Lake Mary Boulevard east of Country Club Road. Though the station is officially located on West Lake Mary Boulevard, the actual platforms are located southwest of the Greenleaf Lane grade crossing between North Palmetto Street and East Crystal Lake Avenue and Old Lake Mary Road. The parking lot runs along the west side of North Palmetto Street between West Lake Mary Boulevard and Greenleaf Lane. A transit-oriented development called Station House is located adjacent to the station and features a 200-unit, four story luxury apartment community.
