= Longwood (Gordonsville, Virginia) =

Historic house in Virginia, United States

- U.S. National Register of Historic Places
- Virginia Landmarks Register
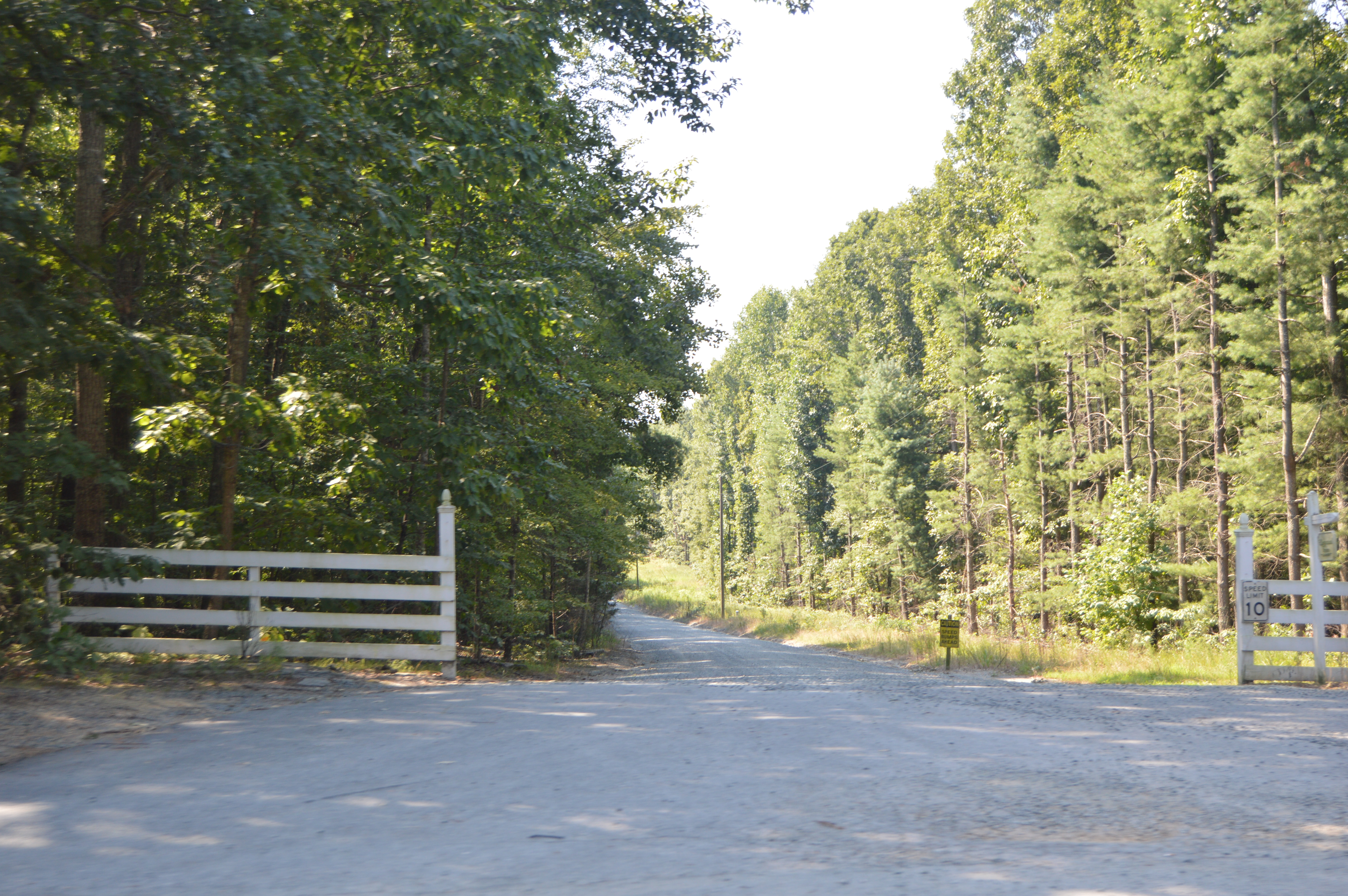
- Property entrance

- Location within Virginia Location within the United States
- Location: 924 Longwood Dr., Gordonsville, Virginia
- Coordinates: 38°3′43″N 78°13′16″W
- Area: 121 acres (49 ha)
- Built: 1859
- Architectural style: Greek Revival
- NRHP reference No.: 02000998
- VLR No.: 054-0326

Significant dates
- Added to NRHP: September 14, 2002
- Designated VLR: September 14, 2002

Longwood is a historic home located at Gordonsville, Louisa County, Virginia. It was built about 1859, and is a two-story, three-bay, frame dwelling in the Greek Revival style. It features a low-pitched hipped roof and two interior brick chimneys. Also on the property is a contributing historic brick well.

It was listed on the National Register of Historic Places in 2002.
