= Lake Mary High School =

Location
- 655 Longwood Lake Mary Rd; Lake Mary, Florida 32746; United States
- 28.7366°N 81.3368°W

Information
- Type: Public
- Established: 1981
- Principal: Mickey Reynolds
- Teaching staff: 130.03 (FTE)
- Enrollment: 2,684 (2023-2024)
- Student to teacher ratio: 20.64
- Colors: White, scarlet and silver
- Nickname: Rams
- Telephone: (407) 320-9550
- Website: lakemaryhs.scps.k12.fl.us

Lake Mary High School is a public high school located in Seminole County, Florida, operating under Seminole County Public Schools. It was opened in 1981.

== Campus ==
Lake Mary High School was the fourth high school in Seminole County, opening for the 1981–82 academic year. The 300,000-square-foot (28,000 m^{2}) physical plant includes an 800-seat auditorium, 890-seat cafeteria, 2,200-seat gymnasium, a media center, and 13 computer labs. The high school grounds contain a 4,500-seat stadium, lighted baseball field, softball field, track, tennis and handball courts, and an indoor practice building. Since 2002, the campus has undergone a $20 million project involving both new construction and remodeling, funded by a county-wide sales tax. A new 27,000-square-foot (2,500 m^{2}) auditorium with modern band, chorus, dance and drama facilities opened in July 2003, along with a 6,000 sq ft (560 m^{2}) multipurpose fieldhouse. The main building remodeling includes a new media center (14,500 sq ft), CCTV studios, additional classrooms, relocation of the administration, and expanded applied technology labs. The final phase, completed in 2006, provided practice fields and courts, parking and drainage improvements, and concession space.

== Mascot ==
The ram is the Lake Mary High School mascot. In 2010, Chrysler objected to its corporate ram logo being used without permission. The Seminole County School Board ordered removal of Chrysler's logo from T-shirts, benches, wrestling mats, the school track and gym floor by June 15, 2010. Lake Mary High School responded that it would cost too much to remove the infringing logos, and local Chrysler dealers bore the brunt of local community anger. After discussions, a special agreement by Chrysler allowed Lake Mary High School to continue using the Dodge Ram logo as its athletic mascot, at least until equipment bearing the logo needs replacement. Instead of having to pay for the removal, Lake Mary High School will be a “Chrysler Business Partner” and will promote the relationship. Global Village Concerns (GVC), a branding and marketing services company founded in response to budget cuts impacting schools nationwide, has partnered with the school to create a new school image.

== Students ==
- "A" rating for 2010 by Florida Department of Education.
- 94% graduation rate in 2012.
- 87% of 10th graders at grade level or above on 2006 FCAT Writing Test
- 2005 seniors led all Seminole County Schools in ACT: 22.8 (national: 20.9), for the 10th consecutive year.
- 2005 seniors led all Seminole County Schools in SAT: 1081 (county: 1041, national: 1028).
- 12 National Merit Scholarship Program Semifinalists.
- Four seniors (1985, 1995, 2004 & 2011) named United States Presidential Scholars.
- Three seniors honored as National Hispanic Scholars.
- Two seniors awarded the 2005 National Council of Teachers of English Achievement Award in Writing.
- One senior awarded the 2006 National Council of Teachers of English Achievement Award in Writing, this senior was the only winner in Seminole County.
- Students participate in 69 organizations and clubs. High points for 2005-2006 include:

- Mu Alpha Theta Math Team: 8 students qualify for American Invitational Mathematics Exam.
- Chorus won best performance at the 3rd Annual Golden Lyre Awards, plus 4 individual and 4 ensemble superior awards at District competition.
*The Lake Mary Marching Rams marching and concert bands. Ram musicians are well represented in the Tri-State Honors Band, All-State Honors Band and All-County Honors Band. Every year, several students receive superiors at district and state solo/ensemble festivals.
- Nte Varsity Lake Mary Junior Engineering Technical Society Team was regional champions.
- International Thespian Society Troupe 3506 received 9 individual Superiors, the One Act received a superior, 3 students made the All-Star Cast and Crew, and two individual events received "Best in Show" for the whole district.
- The Lake Marionettes dance team was selected to perform for the nationally televised program Extreme Makeover: Home Edition.
- The colorguard is the 2000 A-class gold medalist, holding the record for highest score in the class (98.6). They are also 2002 open class silver medalists and 7 time WGI finalists.

- The Varsity Competition Cheer squad has won back to back state titles (2016,2017)

== Notable alumni ==
- Brad Blackwood, 1990, Grammy and Pensado Award-winning mastering engineer
- Brad Bridgewater, 1991, 1996 Olympic gold medal in the men's 200 meter backstroke
- Matt Butcher, 2001, singer-songwriter
- Reggie Campbell, 2003, football running back
- Dylan Crews, 2023 Golden Spikes winner, MCWS winner with LSU baseball
- Ashleigh Gnat, 2013, 17-time All-American for LSU gymnastics
- Tara Dawn Holland, 1990, Miss America 1997
- Chad Kessler, All-American football player
- Sabrina Lloyd, 1989, actor in numerous movies and television shows, including Sliders, Father Hood, and Numb3rs.
- Todd Peterson, 2016, MLB pitcher
- Keith Rivers, 2004, USC linebacker, 9th overall 2008 NFL draft pick by the Cincinnati Bengals)
- Brendan Rodgers, 2015 Colorado Rockies first round pick in 2015 MLB draft and 3rd overall
- Nick Westbrook-Ikhine, 2015, wide receiver for the Miami Dolphins
- Shea Whigham, 1987, actor in numerous movies and television shows, including Fast & Furious, Wolf of Wall Street, Boardwalk Empire, Agent Carter, and others

== Awards and distinctions ==
Lake Mary High School lays claim to several awards and recognitions.

- Orlando Sentinel Varsity Cup, 2005
- Florida Department of Education/PTSA Parent Involvement Award, 2005
- Five Star School Award, 2005
- Florida High School Athletic Association, Class 6A, All Sports Champions, 2004-2005
- Ranked #248 of Newsweek's America's Best High Schools, 2007

== Athletic honors ==
The athletic logo.

Football

- 2025 7A FHSAA State Champions

Lacrosse

- 2023, 2024 FHSAA State Champions

Soccer

- 2019 FHSAA State Champions, Boy's Varsity Soccer; first win for Lake Mary High School and Seminole County.
- 2003, 1987 FHSAA State Runner-Ups, Boy's Varsity Soccer

Basketball

The girls' basketball team won the Florida state championship in 1998, 2006, and 2010.

Cheer

- 2007 National Champions & Innovative Choreography Award
- 2007 Varsity-Best All-Around Routine
- 2017,2018,2019,2020,2021 FHSAA State Champions

Dance

- Lake Marionettes Dance Team: 19 time national high kick champions, most recent 2016 National Dance Association

Golf

The boys' golf team won the state championship in 2004, 2006, and 2009. The girls' team won in 2007 and 2009.
