= Lake Mary, Florida =

- City
- City of Lake Mary
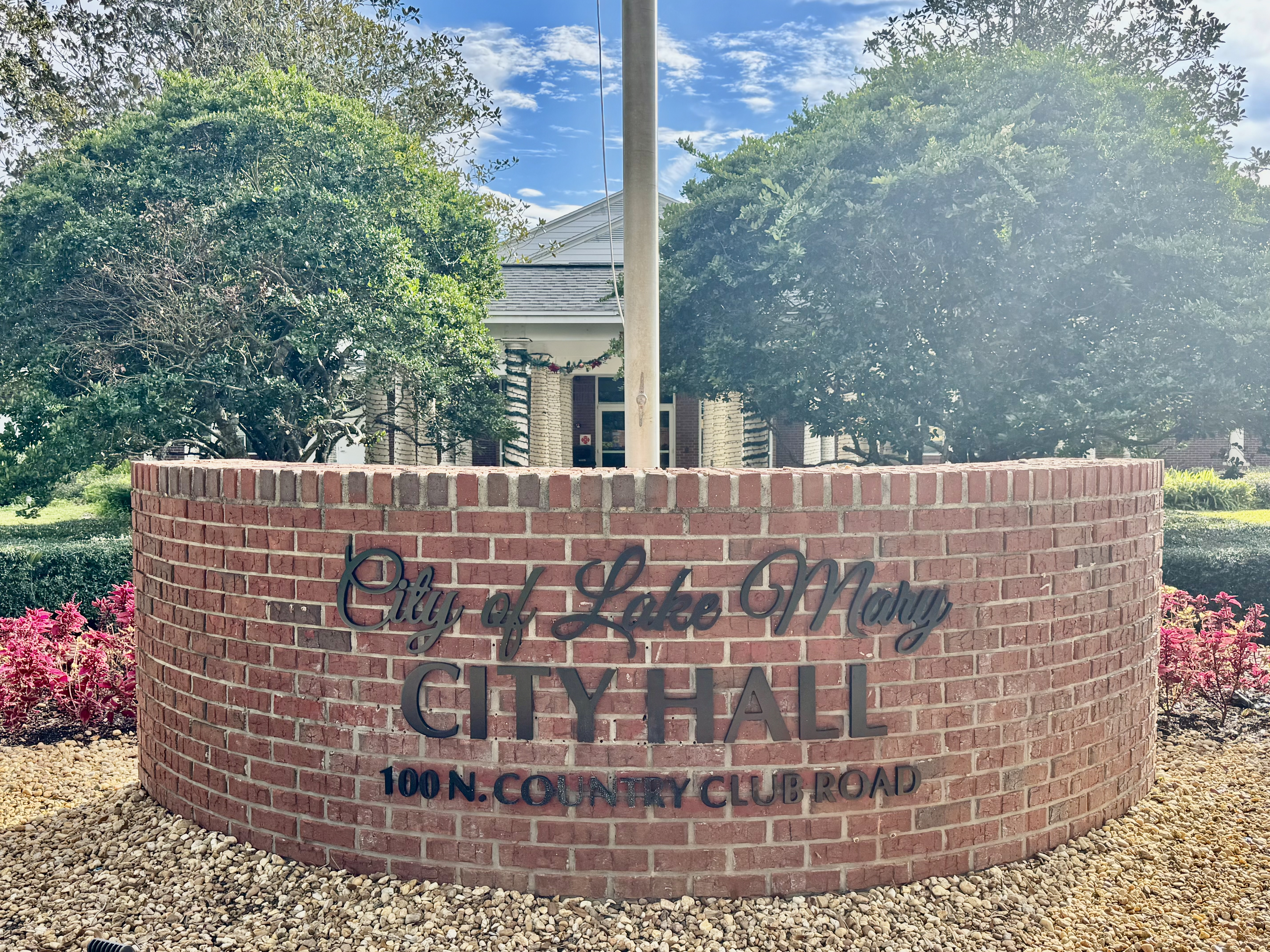
- City Hall in 2026

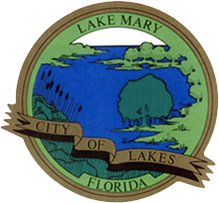
- Seal
- Motto: City of Lakes
- Location in Seminole County and the state of Florida
- Coordinates: 28°45′02″N 81°19′44″W
- Country: United States
- State: Florida
- County: Seminole
- Incorporated (city): August 7, 1973

Area
  - City: 9.88 sq mi (25.58 km^{2})
  - Land: 9.07 sq mi (23.50 km^{2})
  - Water: 0.80 sq mi (2.07 km^{2})
- Elevation: 56 ft (17 m)

Population (2020)
  - City: 16,798
  - Density: 1,851.0/sq mi (714.69/km^{2})
  - Metro: 2,082,421
- Time zone: UTC-5 (EST)
  - Summer (DST): UTC-4 (EDT)
- ZIP codes: 32746, 32795
- Area codes: 407, 689
- FIPS code: 12-38425
- GNIS feature ID: 2404865
- Website: [www.lakemaryfl.com/(http://www.lakemaryfl.com/)]

Lake Mary is a suburban city in Seminole County, Florida, United States, and part of the Orlando–Kissimmee–Sanford metropolitan area in Central Florida. The population was 16,798 at the 2020 census, up from 13,822 in 2010.

The modern community developed in the late 19th century along the railroad between Sanford and Orlando as a citrus-growing and agricultural settlement. Lake Mary was incorporated in 1973 and experienced substantial residential and commercial growth beginning in the 1970s, developing into a suburban residential and employment center in the Orlando metropolitan area.

The city was home to the team that won the 2024 Little League World Series.

== History ==
=== Indigenous history ===
The region surrounding present-day Lake Mary was inhabited by Indigenous peoples for thousands of years before European colonization. Archaeological sites throughout the upper St. Johns River and Wekiva River basins document prehistoric occupation over an extended period.

At the Lake Monroe Outlet Midden, near the modern Interstate 4 crossing of the St. Johns River northeast of Lake Mary, archaeologists have documented a Middle-to-Late Archaic settlement dating to approximately 5,600 years before present. The site contained extensive freshwater shell middens, animal and plant remains, stone tools and a separate lithic workshop. Archaeological evidence indicates that its inhabitants practiced a fishing, hunting and gathering economy based on the resources of the St. Johns River environment. Nonlocal stone and marine-shell artifacts also indicate travel or exchange with communities elsewhere in Florida and the southeastern United States.

Archaeological sites have also been recorded in the Markham Woods and Wekiva areas west of Lake Mary, including prehistoric shell middens and lithic sites.

The cultural identities of the Indigenous peoples occupying the Wekiva region at the time of European contact are not fully resolved. Earlier interpretations associated the area with the Timucua, while later historical research has suggested that the Mayaca, Jororo or Rinconada peoples may have inhabited the Wekiva basin. The Florida Department of Environmental Protection has noted that additional archaeological research is necessary to determine these associations more conclusively.

=== Early settlement ===
The modern community of Lake Mary developed during the late 19th century around two small settlements, Bent's Station and Belle Fontaine, located along the South Florida Railroad between Sanford and Orlando. The local economy was based largely on agriculture, particularly citrus production, with early residents also involved in lumber and turpentine.

The community was named for Mary Sundell, the wife of the Reverend J. F. Sundell, who settled on the northern shore of the lake.

Frank Evans, a former circus performer and chemist, settled in the area in 1882 and became an important figure in the development of the community. Evans constructed commercial buildings and homes and built the original Lake Mary Elementary School. The first Lake Mary post office was established in February 1887. Evans later helped establish the Lake Mary Chamber of Commerce in 1923 and became a Seminole County commissioner in 1926.

=== African-American history and segregation ===
The area west of Lake Mary included Markham, a historically African-American settlement that developed during the late 19th century. The former town of Markham existed from approximately 1880 until 1945, and African-American residents of the area participated in the agricultural, lumber and turpentine economy of northern Seminole County.

Oak Grove Missionary Baptist Church served the African-American community at Markham. Historical and archaeological resources associated with the community also include Pinnie Ridge Cemetery, an African-American cemetery dating to the 19th and 20th centuries.

Education in Seminole County was racially segregated during the Jim Crow era. Seminole County school records from 1913 through 1954 document teachers employed at separate white and African-American schools throughout the county. The records include schools in Lake Mary and Markham as well as African-American schools in other Seminole County communities.

=== Incorporation and suburban development ===
Lake Mary remained primarily an agricultural community into the 20th century. During the 1970s, as metropolitan Orlando expanded, the community began changing from a semi-rural area into a suburban residential community serving the Orlando area.

Lake Mary was incorporated as a city on August 7, 1973. During the late 1980s and early 1990s, the city experienced substantial residential and commercial development, including the construction of office, retail and industrial space.

Development continued along the Interstate 4 corridor, contributing to Lake Mary's emergence as an employment center as well as a residential suburb.

The Lake Mary Historical Museum preserves documents, photographs and artifacts relating to the history of Lake Mary and surrounding communities.

== Geography ==
Lake Mary is located in northern Seminole County in Central Florida, approximately 19 miles (31 km) north of downtown Orlando. The city is part of the Orlando–Kissimmee–Sanford Metropolitan Statistical Area.

According to the United States Census Bureau, Lake Mary has a total area of 9.88 square miles (25.6 km^{2}), of which 9.07 square miles (23.5 km^{2}) is land and 0.80 square miles (2.1 km^{2}) is water.

== Demographics ==
Historical population
Census	Pop.	Note	%±
1980	2,853		—
1990	5,929		107.8%
2000	11,458		93.3%
2010	13,822		20.6%
2020	16,798		21.5%
U.S. Decennial Census

Lake Mary's population was 16,798 at the 2020 United States census, an increase of 21.5% from 13,822 at the 2010 United States census.

=== Race and ethnicity ===
According to the 2020 census, 64.88% of Lake Mary's population was non-Hispanic White, 9.64% was non-Hispanic Asian, 6.11% was non-Hispanic Black or African American, 3.97% identified as two or more races and 0.08% was non-Hispanic American Indian or Alaska Native. Hispanic or Latino residents of any race represented 14.60% of the population.

In 2010, 76.99% of the population was non-Hispanic White, 5.95% was non-Hispanic Asian, 4.64% was non-Hispanic Black or African American and 1.79% identified as two or more races. Hispanic or Latino residents of any race represented 10.19% of the population.

Between 2010 and 2020, the non-Hispanic White share of the city's population declined from 77.0% to 64.9%, while the Asian share increased from 6.0% to 9.6%, the Black or African-American share increased from 4.6% to 6.1%, and the Hispanic or Latino share increased from 10.2% to 14.6%.

=== Age and households ===
At the 2020 census, the median age in Lake Mary was 44.5 years. Residents under 18 accounted for 19.3% of the population, while 19.6% were age 65 or older.

There were 6,694 occupied households and 7,132 housing units in 2020. Of the city's households, 55.5% were married-couple households, while 25.6% consisted of individuals. Approximately 9.9% of households included a person age 65 or older living alone.

=== Income and education ===
According to the Census Bureau's 2020–2024 estimates, Lake Mary had a median household income of $109,173 and a per capita income of $59,681. Approximately 3.5% of residents lived below the poverty line.

About 50.9% of residents age 25 or older held a bachelor's degree or higher, and about 18.8% of residents were foreign-born.

The Census Bureau estimated 6,913 households and 7,412 housing units for the 2020–2024 period. Approximately 62.9% of occupied housing units were owner-occupied.

== Education ==
Public schools serving Lake Mary are operated by Seminole County Public Schools. Schools serving the Lake Mary area include Lake Mary Elementary School, Crystal Lake Elementary School, Heathrow Elementary School, Greenwood Lakes Middle School, Markham Woods Middle School and Lake Mary High School.

Seminole State College of Florida operates its Sanford/Lake Mary Campus immediately east of Lake Mary in Sanford. The campus opened in 1966, when the institution was known as Seminole Junior College, and was the college's first campus.

ECPI University also operates an Orlando/Lake Mary campus.

== Economy ==
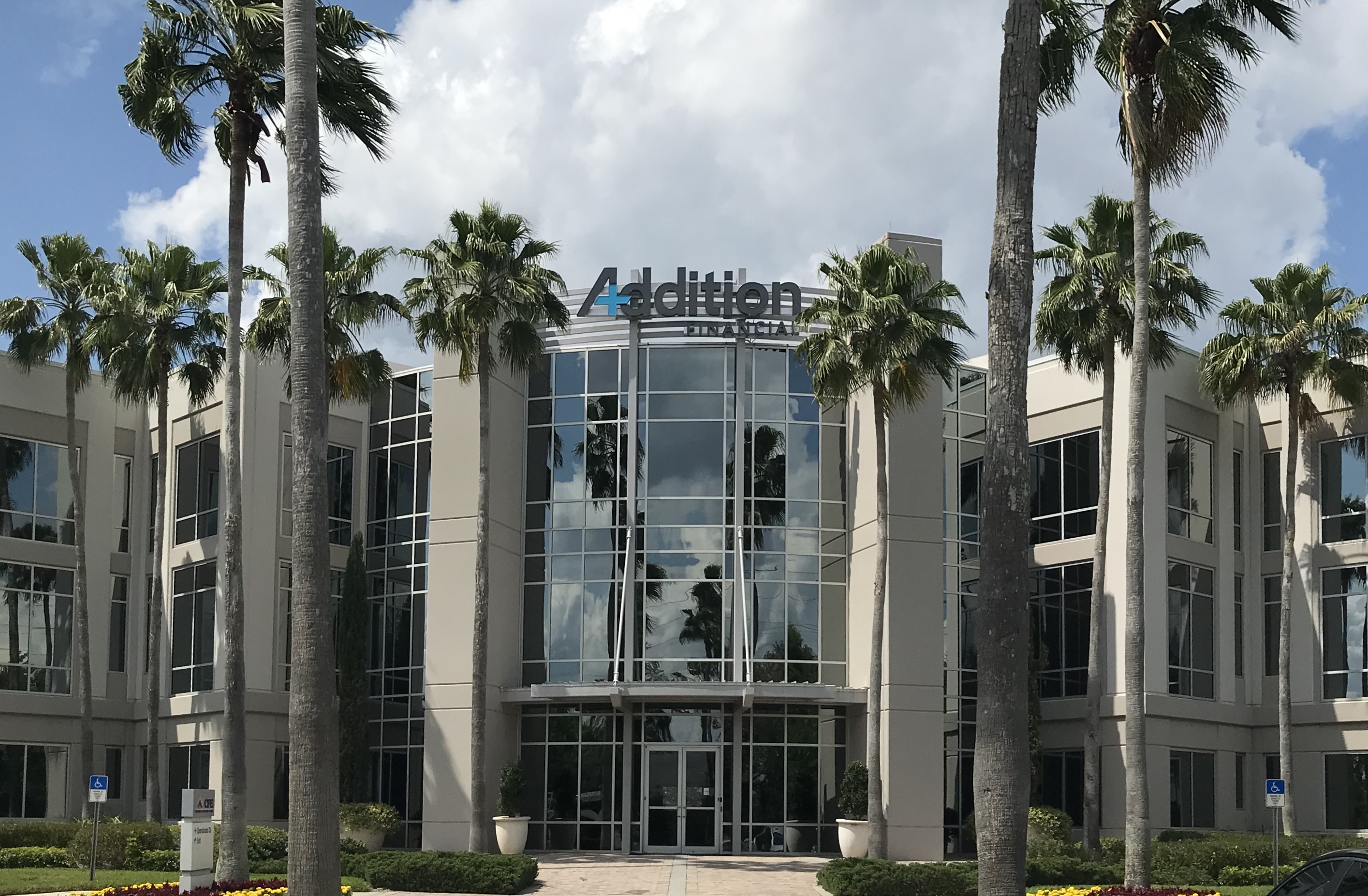
Lake Mary Operations Center

Lake Mary developed into a suburban employment center beginning in the late 1980s and early 1990s, when substantial office, retail and industrial development accompanied the city's residential growth. Much of the city's corporate and commercial development is concentrated along the Interstate 4 corridor.

The American Automobile Association has major operations in Lake Mary. Other companies with operations in the Lake Mary area include Deloitte, Mitsubishi Power, Liberty Mutual, Bank of America, Verizon and JPMorgan Chase.

Dixon Ticonderoga, a manufacturer of pencils and art supplies, is headquartered in Lake Mary. Accesso, a technology company serving the leisure and attractions industry, has its North American headquarters in Lake Mary.

== Transportation ==
Interstate 4 passes along the western portion of Lake Mary and provides highway access to Orlando, Sanford and the wider Central Florida region. Lake Mary Boulevard is a major east–west thoroughfare connecting the city with Interstate 4 and other communities in Seminole County.

The city is served by Lake Mary station, part of the SunRail commuter rail system. The station is located near the intersection of Lake Mary Boulevard and Country Club Road, approximately 0.5 miles (0.80 km) from downtown Lake Mary. The station also provides access to the Cross Seminole Trail.

Modern passenger rail service follows the same general transportation corridor that contributed to the development of Lake Mary as a railroad settlement in the late 19th century.

== Notable people ==
- Jordan Bender, soccer player
- Lee Corso, sports broadcaster and football analyst for ESPN
- Chris DiMarco, professional golfer in PGA
- Gigi Fernández, professional Puerto Rican tennis player
- Rowdy Gaines, Olympic gold medal winner and NBC swimming analyst
- Aubrey Peeples, actor and singer
- Keith Rivers, linebacker for the New York Giants in the NFL
- Toni Tennille, Grammy Award winner, singer, songwriter, author
- Stan Van Gundy, head coach of Orlando Magic (2007–2012), Detroit Pistons
- Rickie Weeks, professional baseball player for Milwaukee Brewers
- Shea Whigham, actor

== See also ==
- Lake Mary station
