= Bradlee-McIntyre House =

Historic house in Florida, United States

- U.S. National Register of Historic Places
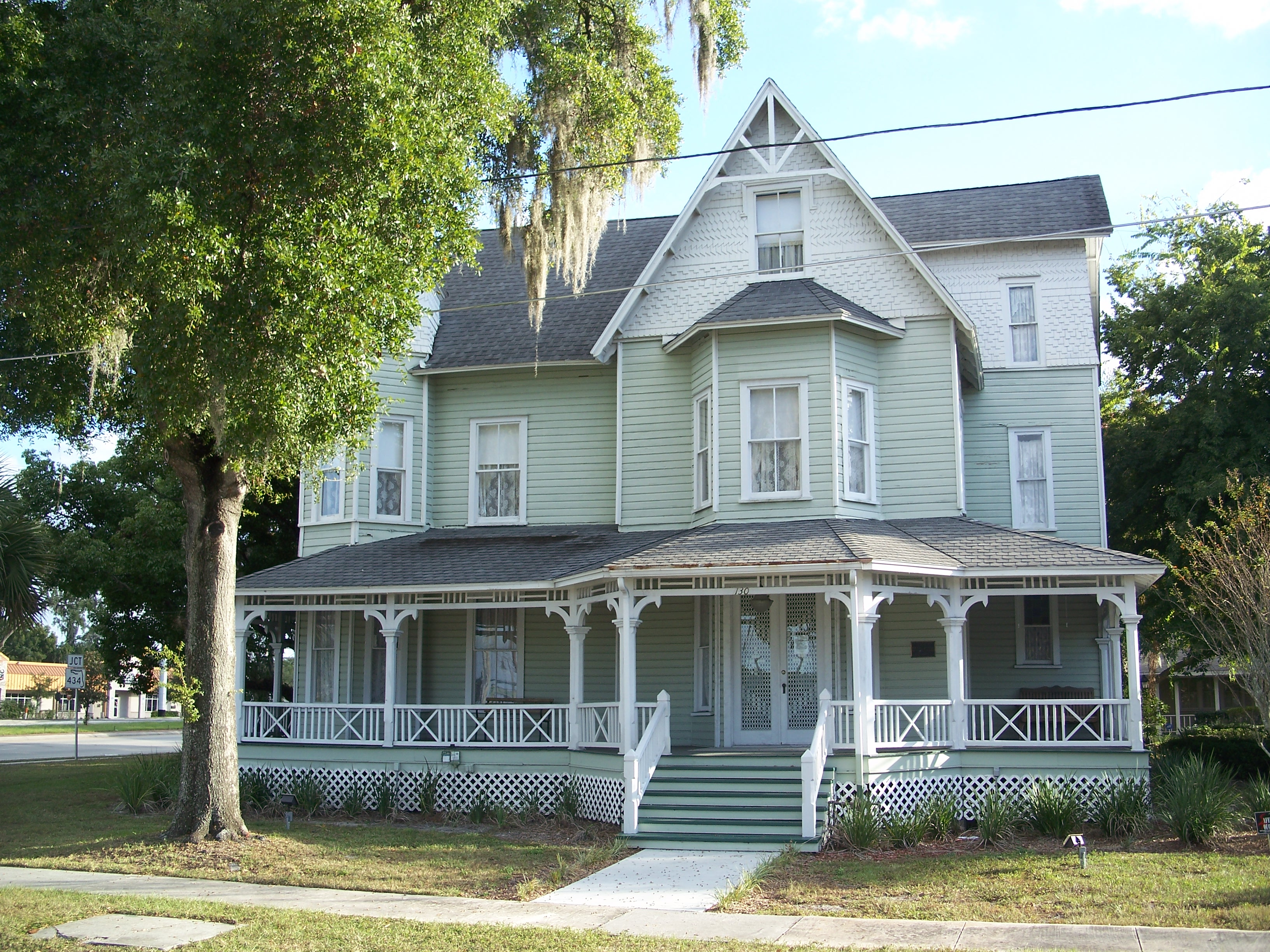
- The Bradlee-McIntyre House in 2010

- Location within Florida Location within the United States
- Location: 130 W. Warren Ave., Longwood, Florida
- Coordinates: 28°39′50″N 81°22′4″W
- Area: less than one acre
- Built: c. 1885
- NRHP reference No.: 72000352
- Added to NRHP: March 28, 1991

The Bradlee-McIntyre House is a Victorian Cottage Style house, located in Longwood, Florida. On March 28, 1991, the house was added to the U.S. National Register of Historic Places.

Currently, the Bradlee-McIntyre House is open to the public for tours on scheduled days as posted at the house. Museum tours are offered the 2nd and 4th Wednesdays and Sundays from 1-4 pm.

== History ==
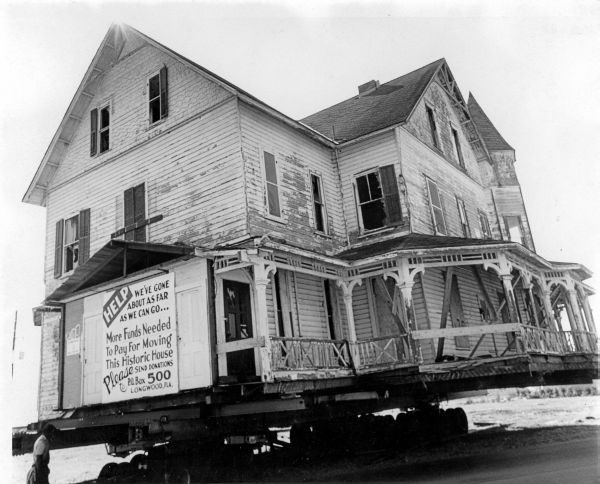
The house en route to its new location in Longwood

The Bradlee-McIntyre House was built circa 1885 for noted Boston architect Nathaniel Jeremiah Bradlee and family. It is the only surviving "cottage" in Orange and Seminole counties, a Queen Anne Style three-story, 13-room winter vacation house featuring an octagonal tower and "ginger-bread" trim typical of the flamboyant houses of the Victorian Period.

Due to the threat of demolition, the house was moved from Altamonte Springs to Longwood in 1973.
