= Longwood Hotel =

- U.S. National Register of Historic Places
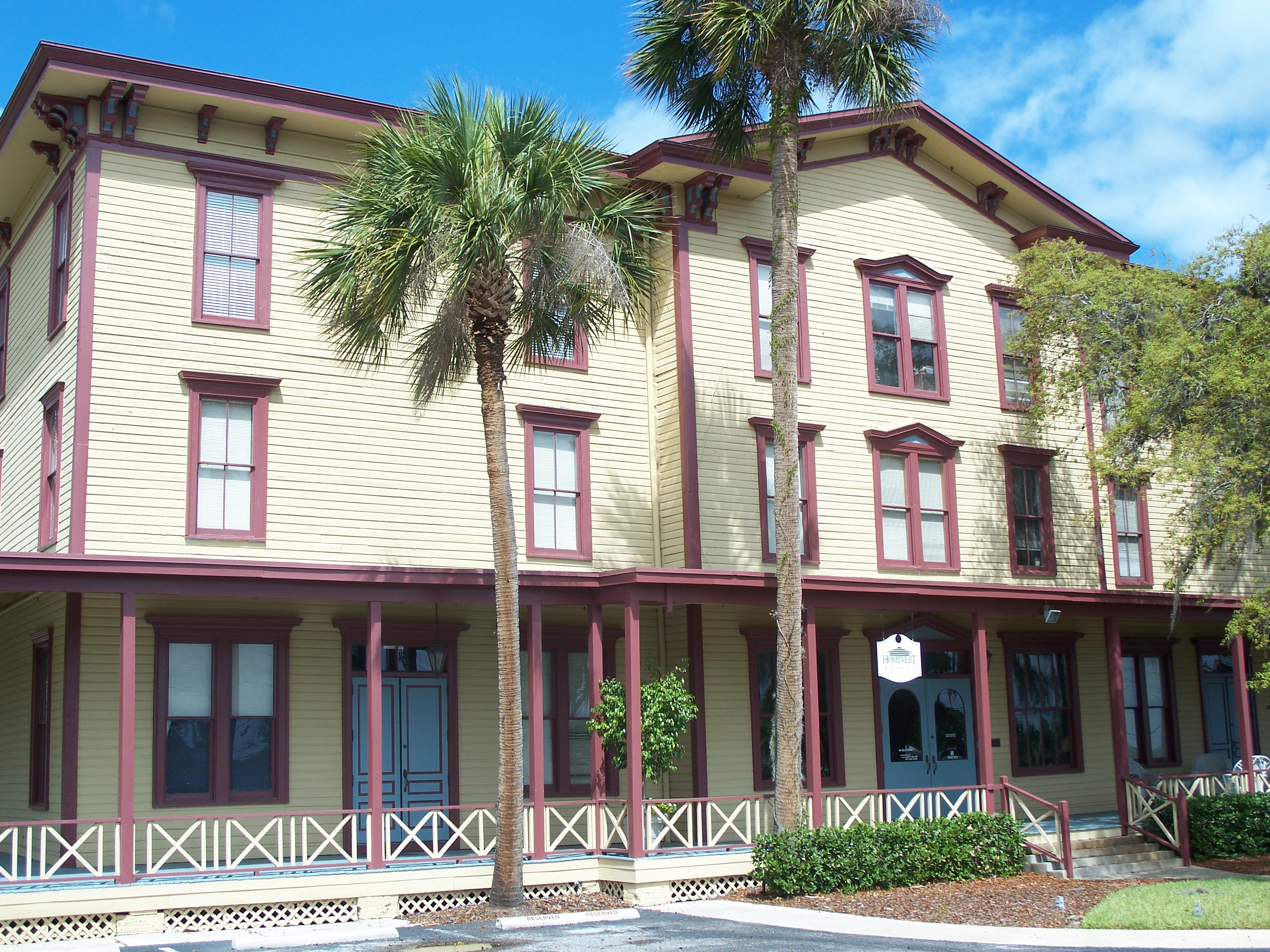

- Location within Florida Location within the United States
- Location: Longwood, Florida
- Coordinates: 28°42′1″N 81°20′52″W
- NRHP reference No.: 84000963
- Added to NRHP: May 10, 1984

The Longwood Hotel (also known as the St. George Hotel or Orange and Black or Longwood Village Inn) is a historic building in Longwood, Florida. It was located on Old Dixie Highway but is now located at 300 North Ronald Reagan Boulevard. It was added to the U.S. National Register of Historic Places on May 10, 1984. The Longwood Hotel was built in 1885.
