= Longwood Historic District (Longwood, Florida) =

Historic district in Florida, United States

- U.S. National Register of Historic Places
- U.S. Historic district
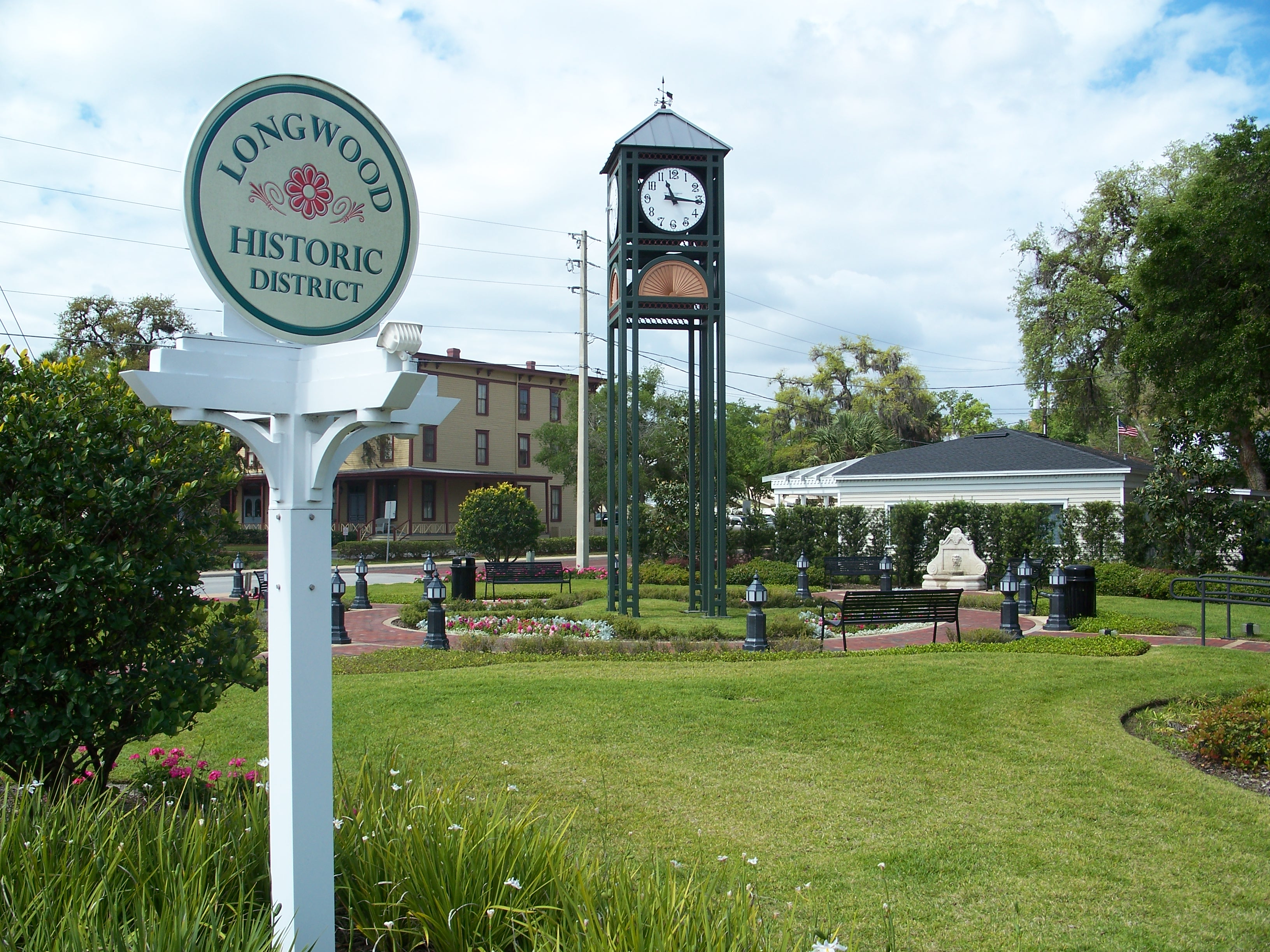
- Looking southwest into the district

- Location within Florida Location within the United States
- Location: Longwood, Florida
- Coordinates: 28°41′57″N 81°20′54″W
- Area: 19 acres (77,000 m^{2})
- NRHP reference No.: 90001480
- Added to NRHP: October 5, 1990

The Longwood Historic District is a U.S. historic district (designated as such on October 5, 1990) located in Longwood, Florida. The district is bounded by West Pine Avenue, South Milwee Street, Palmetto Avenue, and CR 427. The district contains 37 historic buildings, including the Bradlee-McIntyre House and the Longwood Hotel.
