= Longwood Historic District (Bronx) =

Historic district in the Bronx, New York

- U.S. National Register of Historic Places
- U.S. Historic district
- New York City Landmark
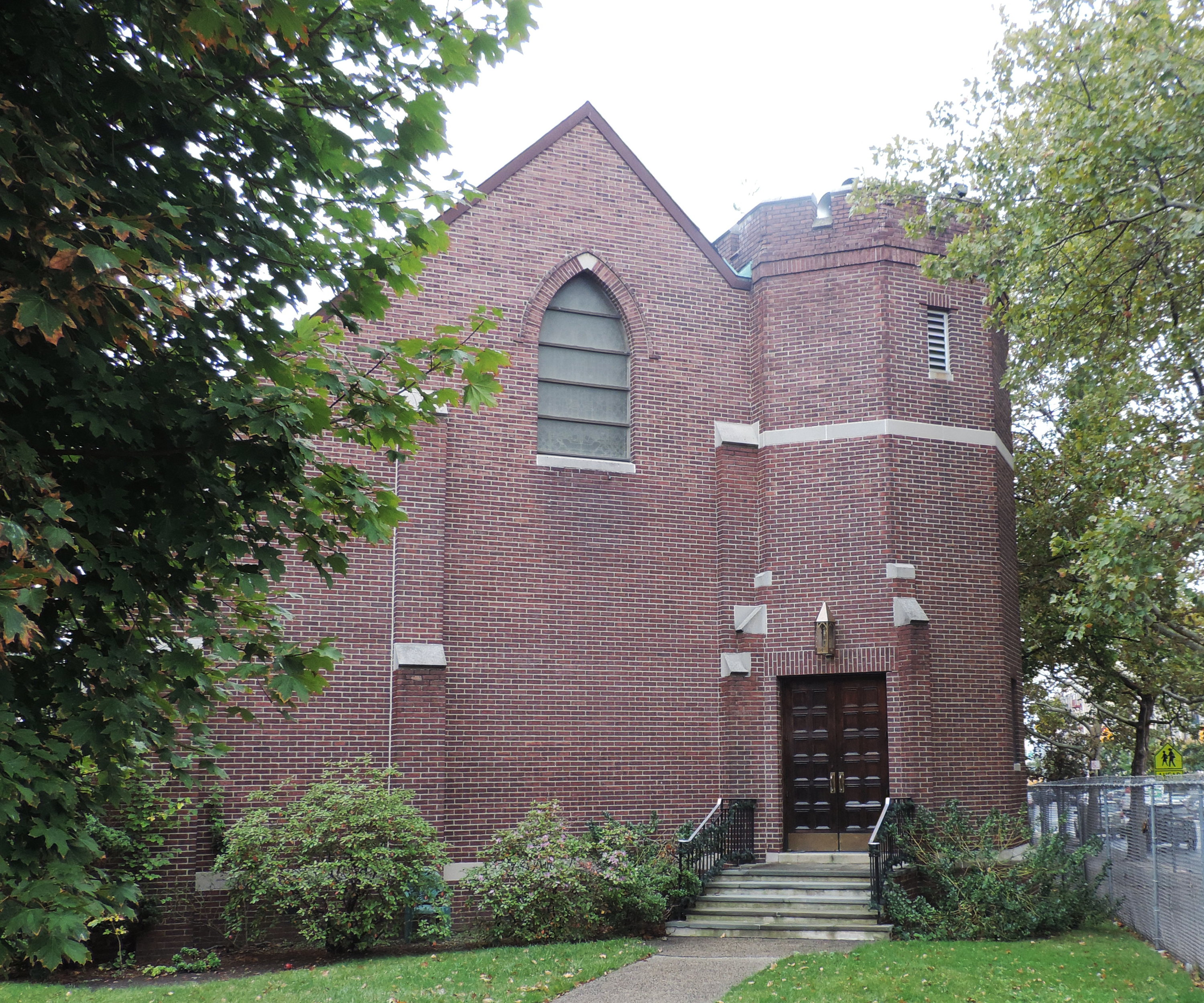
- St Margaret's Church

- Location within New York City Location within New York Location within the United States
- Location: Bronx, New York, New York
- Coordinates: 40°49′0″N 73°54′0″W
- Built: 1898
- Architect: Warren C. Dickerson
- Architectural style: Late 19th And 20th Century Revivals, Romanesque
- NRHP reference No.: 83001640
- NYCL No.: 1075, 1286

Significant dates
- Added to NRHP: September 26, 1983
- Designated NYCL: July 8, 1980 (original), February 8, 1983 (extension)

The Longwood Historic District is a recognized historic district located in the center of the Longwood neighborhood in the South Bronx, New York. It encompasses about three square blocks roughly bounded by Beck Street, Longwood, Leggett, and Prospect Avenues.

The district consists of semi-detached rowhouses, most of which have been converted into S.R.O.'s (Single Room Occupancy). The district includes 61 contributing buildings. It is primarily residential, but also includes the site of the former Prospect Hospital, two churches (United Church and St. Margaret's Episcopal Church), and a much altered estate house (Patrolman P. Lynch Community Center). Most of the semi-detached rowhouses were designed at the same time by one architect, Warren C. Dickerson.

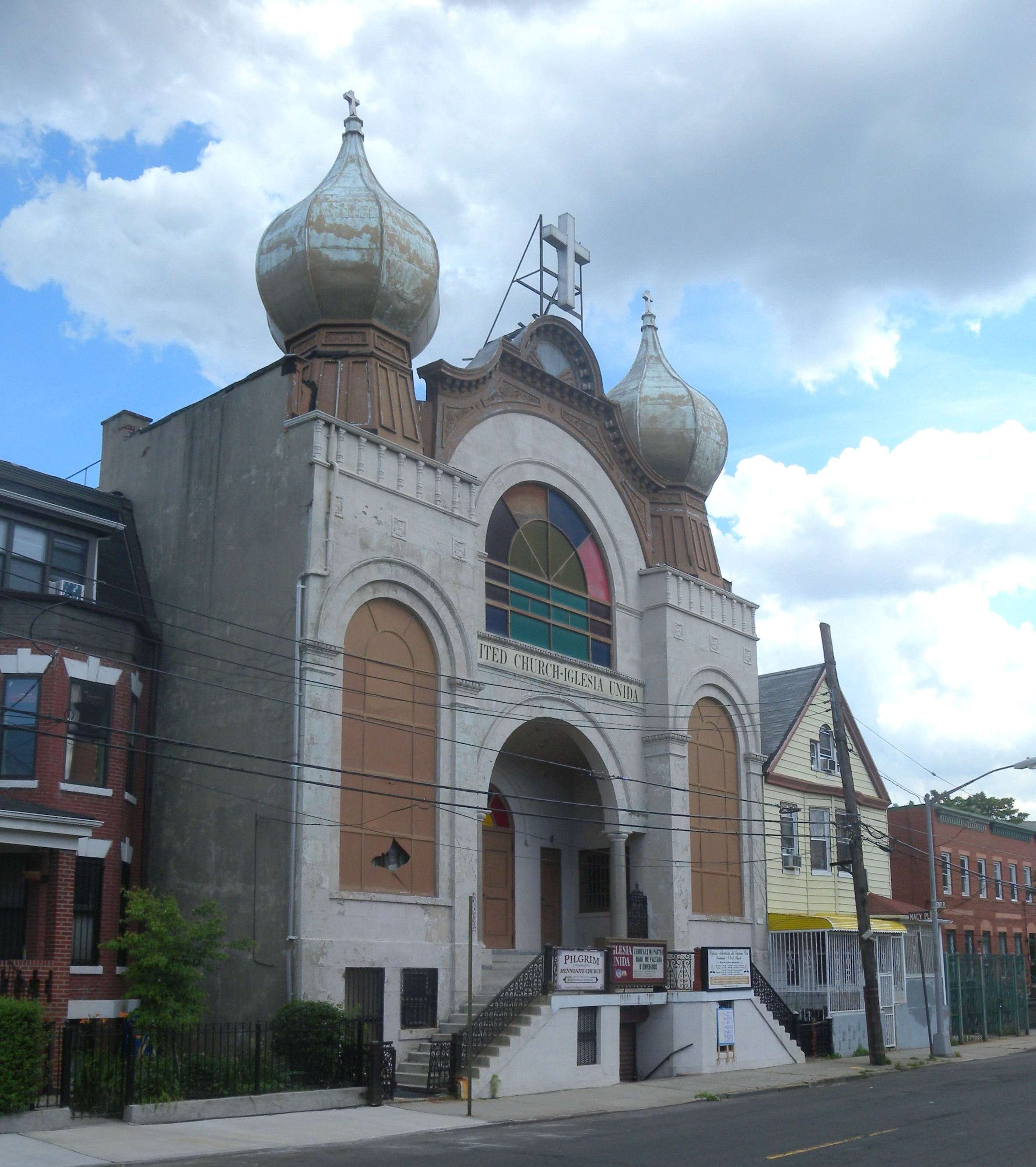
United Church on Hewitt Street, formerly a synagogue

The New York City Landmarks Preservation Commission made it a historic district in 1980 and extended it in 1983. On September 26, 1983, the district was added to the National Register of Historic Places.
