= AutoTrak =

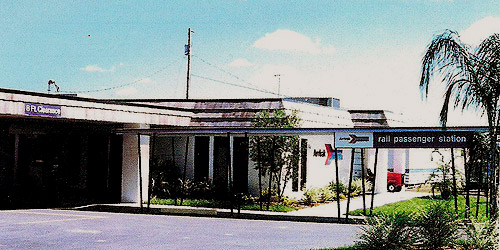
- Poinciana station, built but never used for AutoTrak service

Overview
- Service type: Inter-city motorail
- Status: Cancelled (run experimentally, but never formally launched)

Route
- Termini: Indianapolis; Poinciana
- Stops: 2

On-board services
- Auto-rack arrangements: Yes

Technical
- Track gauge: 4 ft 8 1/2 in (1,435 mm) standard gauge

AutoTrak was a planned motorail service that was to be operated by Amtrak between Indianapolis, Indiana, and Poinciana, Florida. The AutoTrak service was to be Amtrak's answer to the Auto-Train, which, at the time, was operated by the private Auto-Train Corporation. The service was run experimentally, but was ultimately cancelled.

== History ==
Amtrak chose Indianapolis and Poinciana with the intention of each serving as central "collector" locations serving large market areas. Rather than being the end-destinations for travelers, these would be convenient locations along their travel.

Amtrak paid Auto-Liner of Omaha, Nebraska, $500,000 to modify twenty autoracks. A test run from Indianapolis to Florida took place on April 30, 1974, carrying sedans rented from Avis. Unfortunately, the autoracks damaged the automobiles when run at passenger train speeds due to issues with the tie downs.

Amtrak constructed the Poinciana station at a cost of $1 million to ultimately serve as a Florida terminal for the service. The station was opened in September 1974 for the Floridian and Champion. Plans were that this station would not only serve as the terminus of AutoTrak, but as Amtrak's official station to serve passengers heading to the nearby Walt Disney World resort. At the time, AutoTrak service was planned to start later that year.

AutoTrak trains were again experimentally operated beginning in May 1975. Interim equipment was used, with plans for newer and improved equipment to be ordered. The service was ultimately cancelled due to lack of equipment and an "unfavorable economic projection".

The Auto-Train Corporation operated a route of its own between the Midwest and Florida (Louisville–Sanford) from May 24, 1974 until September 3, 1977. Unlike the main Auto-Train route, it was not revived by Amtrak.
