= Autotrain (disambiguation) =

Autotrain or Auto train may refer to:

- Autotrain, a type of push-pull train incorporating a steam locomotive and specially fitted passenger coaches
- Motorail, a passenger train service that incorporates the carriage of automobiles
  - Auto Train, Amtrak motorail service between Virginia and Florida
  - Auto-Train Corporation a defunct motorail service in the United States
