= Gene Garfield =

Gene Garfield may refer to:

- Eugene K. Garfield (1936–2010), American lawyer
- Eugene Garfield (1925–2017), American linguist
