= Eugene K. Garfield =

American lawyer and founder of Auto-Train Corporation

- Born: January 18, 1936; Newark, New Jersey, US
- Died: December 26, 2010 (aged 74); Hollywood, Florida, US
- Known for: Originator of Auto Train
- Partner: Brenda Brush

Eugene Kerik Garfield (January 18, 1936 – December 26, 2010) was an American lawyer who founded the Auto-Train Corporation. Auto-Train became what is now known as Amtrak's Auto Train. He served in the executive branch of the State of Florida and the federal government.

== Early life and government career ==
Garfield was born in Newark, New Jersey, on January 18, 1936, and developed a lifelong interest in railroading after receiving a toy train set as a child, which his sister would later recall: "I would ask him, 'Is that what started all this?'". He graduated from Rutgers University in 1957 with concentrations in Natural Sciences and Higher Mathematics. He graduated from the University of Miami School of Law on June 9, 1960, where he earned his Juris Doctor degree.

He practiced law in Florida and Washington, D.C. In Florida, Garfield served governmental entities in several capacities including Legal Counsel to the Governor of Florida and as General Counsel to the Florida Department of Education. Garfield was a member of the Florida Council of 100, appointed by Governor Reubin Askew. He was a member of the National Highway Safety Commission, appointed by President Gerald R. Ford. While working in Florida, he founded the Florida School Board Attorney's Association. In Washington, D.C., during the administration of President Lyndon B. Johnson, Garfield served in capacities as Assistant to the White House Chief of Staff and Assistant to the first United States Secretary of Transportation. During his tenure there, the Department of Transportation was considering alternatives for developing a scheduled train service for passengers and their vehicles that would operate along the East Coast, operating between travel destinations in Florida and the cities in the Northeast, though it would later decide to leave such service to non-governmental operators.

== Post-government career ==
Following his work in the United States government, Garfield founded the Auto-Train Corporation as a passenger railroad that could also transport personal cars. The Auto-Train came into service in 1971, carrying passengers and their cars on the 900 miles (1,400 km) between Lorton, Virginia and Sanford, Florida, with food service, movies and sleeping cars available to passengers during the 15-hour trip in each direction. The initial trip featured luxury food for passengers and a bar that remained open until 3 a.m.

Garfield had his own personal Pullman car, with private bedrooms and a dining room for himself and his family, that could be attached to the Auto Train. The service was profitable during its first years of operation, frequented by snowbirds making their annual winter migration to Florida, with a disproportionate share of elderly travelers, many taking along their Cadillacs, the vehicle that accounted for as much as 60% of the Auto-Train's car load. In later years losses mounted in the face of lower prices available to leisure travelers heading to Florida by airplane and renting a vehicle at their destination, as well as a money losing branch route to Kentucky. The Auto-Train operation went out of business in 1981, but Amtrak decided to take over the operation in 1983 and continues to offer the service.

He was a member of the Board of Trustees for the Pan American Development Foundation, American University in Washington, D.C., and the National Symphony of the Kennedy Center for the Performing Arts in Washington, D.C. Garfield was a member of the Transportation Committee of the Metropolitan Orlando International Affairs Commission. He was also an Advisory Board Chairperson for the Institute for Transportation Research at Barry University. He served as the primary advisor to the Governor of Florida and the Florida Department of Transportation on the development of a high speed rail system in Florida. Garfield lectured at many schools in the United States including the Wharton School of the University of Pennsylvania, Florida State University, and the Andreas School of Business at Barry University.

== Later years ==
Garfield retired from Auto-Train along with the practice of law and served as the Chairman of the North American Maglev Corporation, his next locomotive endeavor. He died at the age of 74 on December 26, 2010, in Hollywood, Florida due to esophageal cancer.
