= Auto Train =

Amtrak railway service

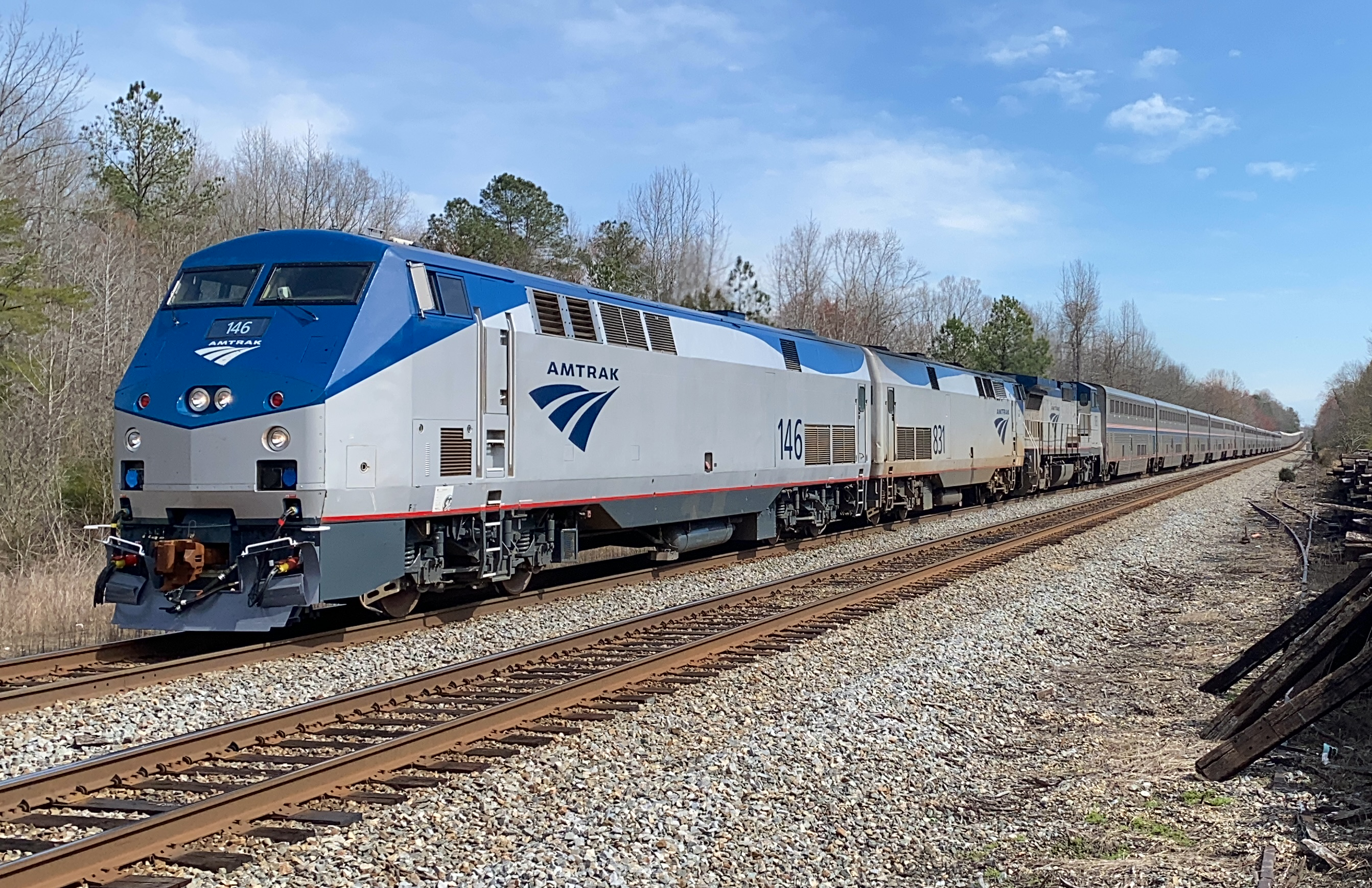
- The Auto Train in Guinea, Virginia in March 2024

Overview
- Service type: Inter-city rail
- Locale: Eastern Seaboard
- First service: October 30, 1983
- Current operator: Amtrak
- Former operator: Auto-Train Corporation
- Annual ridership: 265,952 (FY 25) ▼ -0.2% (Note: Amtrak's Fiscal Year (FY) runs from October 1 of the prior year to September 30 of the named year.)
- Website: amtrak.com/autotrain

Route
- Termini: Lorton, Virginia; Sanford, Florida
- Distance travelled: 855 miles (1,376 km)
- Average journey time: 17 hours
- Service frequency: Daily
- Train number: 52, 53

On-board services
- Classes: Coach Class; First Class Sleeper Service
- Disabled access: Train lower level, all stations
- Sleeping arrangements: Roomette (2 beds); Bedroom (2 beds); Bedroom Suite (4 beds); Accessible Bedroom (2 beds); Family Bedroom (4 beds)
- Auto-rack arrangements: 340 vehicle capacity
- Catering facilities: Dining car, Café
- Observation facilities: Sightseer lounge car
- Baggage facilities: Overhead racks

Technical
- Rolling stock: Siemens Charger locomotives GE Dash 8-32BWH locomotives (backup power); Superliner
- Track gauge: 4 ft 8 1/2 in (1,435 mm) standard gauge
- Operating speed: 50.3 mph (81.0 km/h) (avg.); 70 mph (110 km/h) (top)
- Track owners: CSX, CFRC

Auto Train is an 855-mile (1,376 km) scheduled daily train service for passengers and their automobiles operated by Amtrak between Lorton, Virginia (near Washington, D.C.), and Sanford, Florida (near Orlando). Auto Train is the only motorail service in the United States.

Passengers ride in coach seats or private sleeping car rooms while their vehicles are carried in enclosed automobile-carrying freight cars called autoracks. The train can carry up to 340 vehicles. The train also includes lounge cars and dining cars. Auto Train allows its passengers to avoid driving Interstate 95 in Virginia, North Carolina, South Carolina, Georgia, and Florida while bringing their own vehicles with them. It has the highest revenue of any train in Amtrak's Long Distance Service Line.

The service operates as train number 52 northbound and number 53 southbound. The train operates non-stop between its Virginia and Florida terminals, except for a brief stop in Florence, South Carolina, for servicing and a crew change of the engineers and conductors.

Amtrak's Auto Train is the successor to an earlier, similarly named service operated by the privately owned Auto-Train Corporation in the 1970s.

== History ==
=== Auto-Train Corporation ===
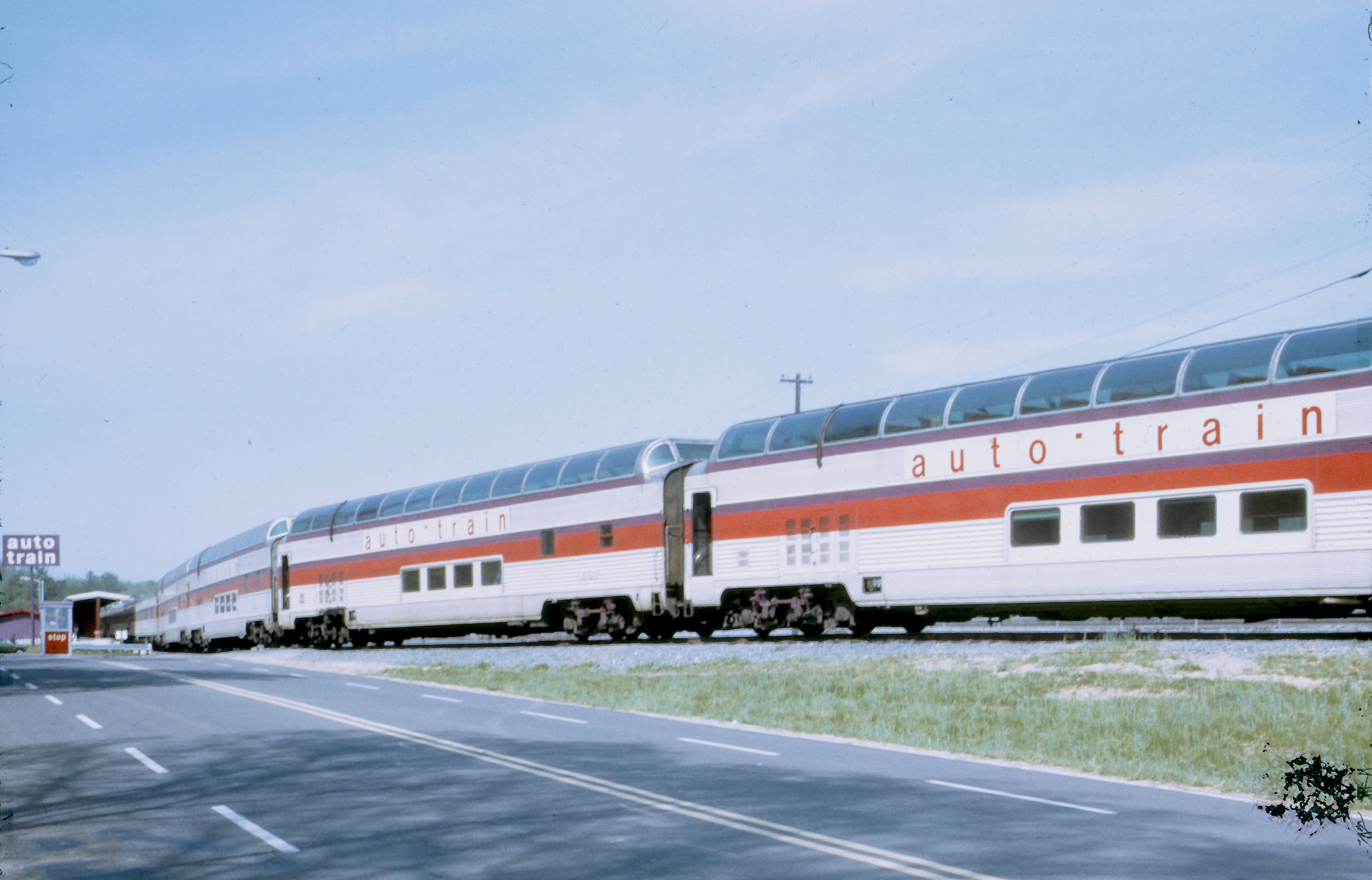
The Auto-Train at Lorton, Virginia, in 1973

The original Auto-Train operated on Seaboard Coast Line Railroad and Richmond, Fredericksburg & Potomac tracks. It was operated by Auto-Train Corporation, a privately owned railroad carrier founded by Eugene K. Garfield. Garfield had worked at the U.S. Department of Transportation, which had funded a study of the practicality of an automobile-train service. He then resigned and later used the study as the blueprint for his enterprise. The company provided a service unique in the country: scheduled rail transportation for passengers and their automobiles between Lorton, Virginia, near Washington, D.C., and Sanford, Florida, near Orlando, Florida.

The Auto-Train Corporation used its own rolling stock, painted in red, white, and purple. The typical train was equipped with two or three General Electric U36B diesel-electric locomotives; 75 ft (22.86 m) double-deck auto carriers; streamlined passenger cars, including coaches, dining cars, and sleeping cars; and 85 ft (25.91 m) full-dome cars; and a caboose, then an unusual sight on most passenger trains. The engines were freight types, purchased at much lower cost than passenger types. But they lacked steam generators, so heat to the passenger cars was supplied by steam-generator cars. Passengers rode in wide coach seats or private first-class sleeping compartments, and meals were served in dining cars. Their vehicles were carried in enclosed autoracks. The company's first autoracks were acquired used, and started life in the 1950s as an innovation of the Canadian National (CN) Railroad. The CN cars were huge by the standards of the time: each 75-footer (23.86 m) could carry eight vehicles, which were loaded through doors at each end.

The Auto-Train began running on December 6, 1971. It was immediately popular with the traveling public and at first enjoyed financial success as well. In fiscal year 1974 the company turned a profit of $1.6 million on revenues of $20 million. In May 1974, service began over a second route between Florida and Louisville, Kentucky, and the company was mulling additional service between Chicago and Denver. The Louisville extension proved to be the company's undoing. The decaying Louisville and Nashville Railroad track between Louisville and Florida (which also hampered Amtrak's Floridian) hindered operations, and a pair of derailments stretched the company's finances to the breaking point. Service ceased on April 30, 1981.

=== Amtrak ===
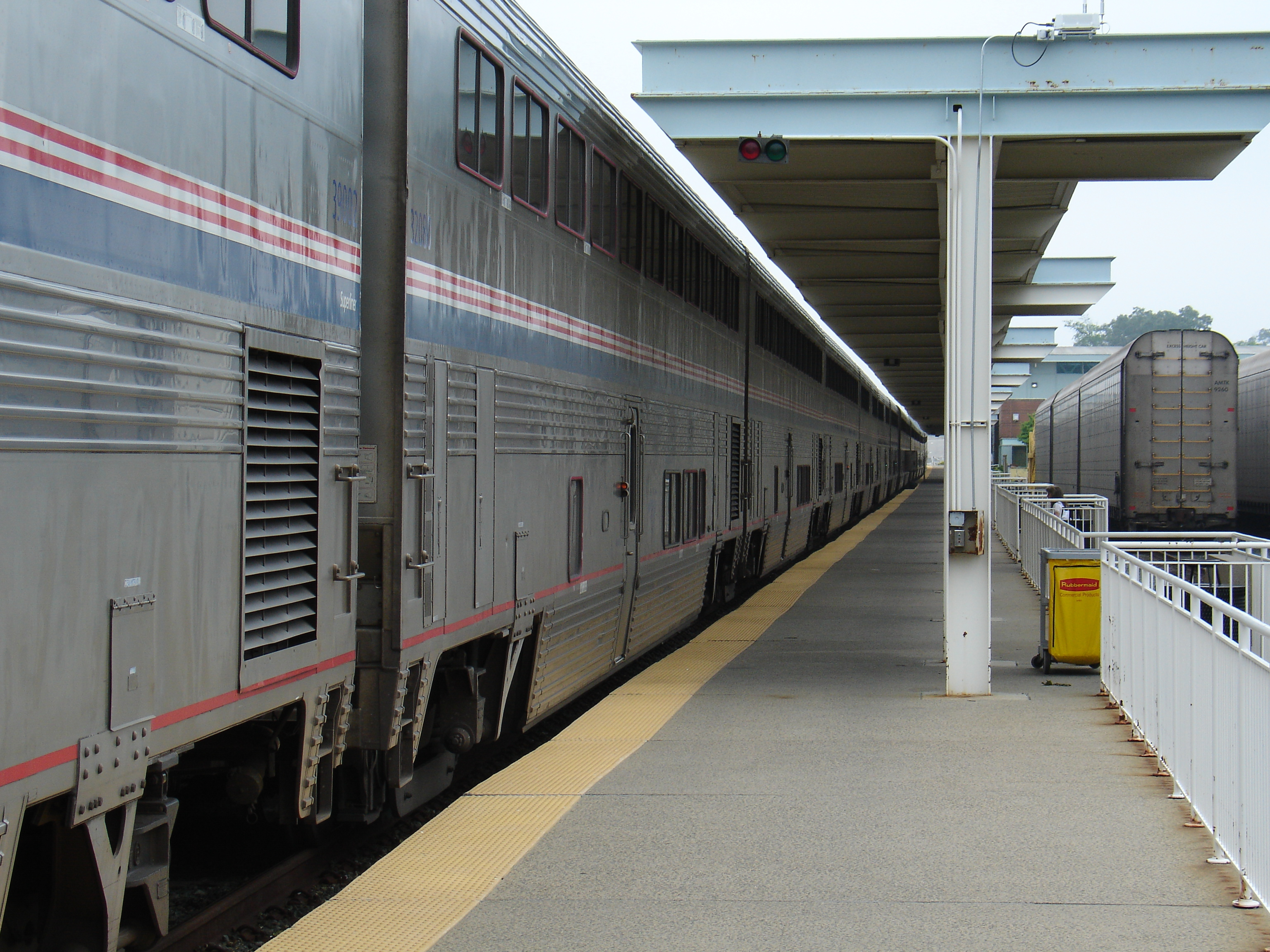
Platform at Lorton station. Superliners are lined up at the left, with autoracks visible to the right.

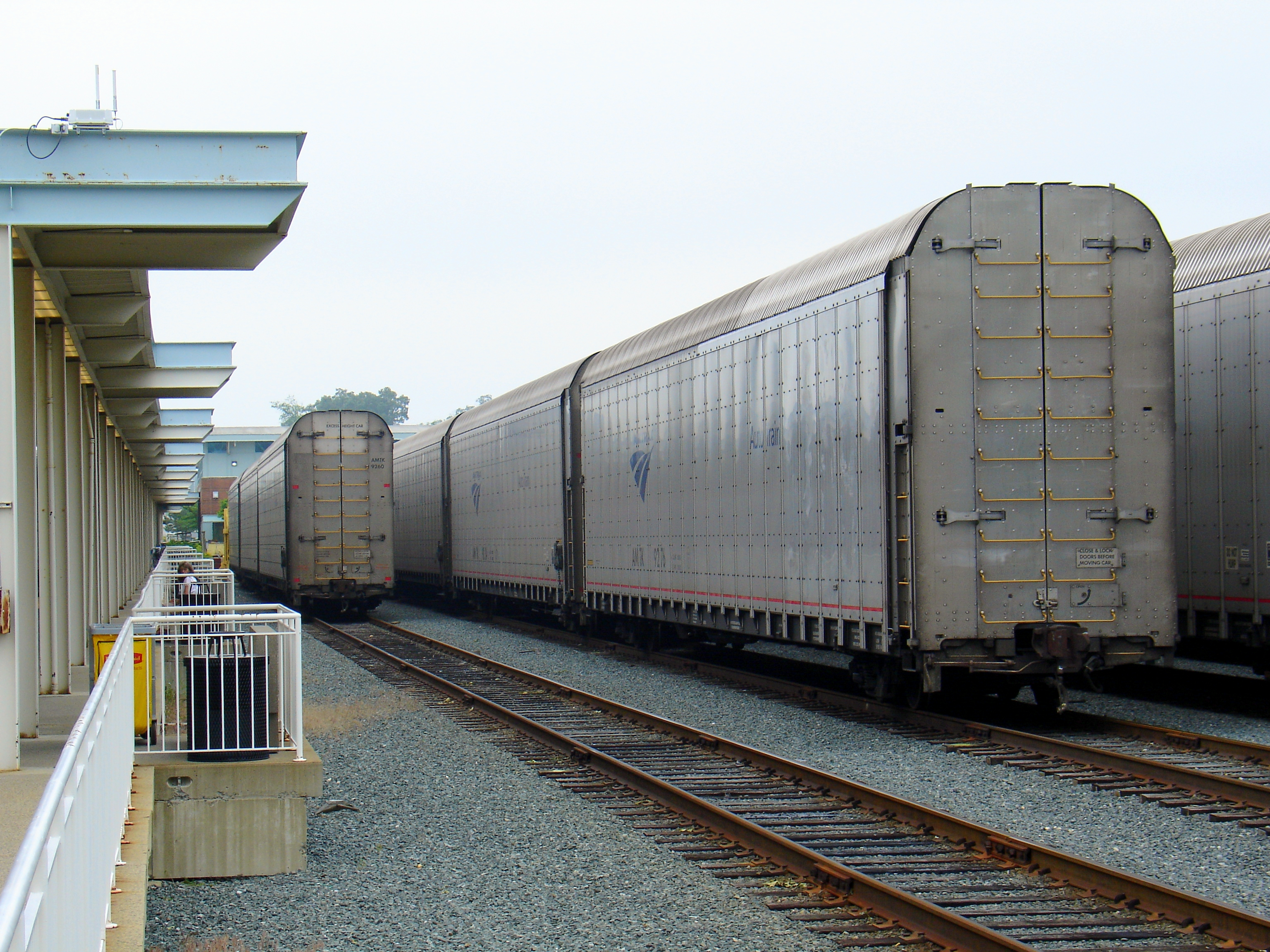
Autoracks lined up at their loading ramps at the Lorton station. The ramps are not visible in this photo.

Amtrak planned to introduce a Midwest–Florida auto train service called "AutoTrak" in 1974. Running between Indianapolis and Poinciana, it would have competed with Auto-Train's Louisville–Sanford service. Amtrak built a terminal at Poinciana, acquired 20 auto-carriers, and ran a test train loaded with rented autos on April 30 – May 1, 1974. The test train damaged the autos; Amtrak delayed and eventually cancelled the AutoTrak service.

Nearly two years after the Auto-Train Corporation folded, the Virginia–Florida service was revived by Amtrak. Amtrak acquired the terminals in Lorton and Sanford and some of the Auto-Train equipment. On October 30, 1983, it introduced a triweekly version of the service under the restyled name "Auto Train". Daily service was introduced a year later.

Amtrak used Auto-Train's bi-level and tri-level autoracks. For passenger equipment, it initially used a mixture of former Auto-Train railcars and mid-century long-distance railcars from Amtrak's general fleet, all rebuilt to Amtrak's "Heritage Fleet" standards. In the mid-1990s, Amtrak replaced all these passenger railcars, which were of the conventional single-level type, with its newer, bi-level Superliner I and II equipment. In 2006, the aging bi-level, tri-level, and "van" autoracks were phased out and replaced with 80 new autoracks.

Amtrak operates two Auto Trains simultaneously each day: southbound #53 from Lorton and northbound #52 from Sanford, departing at 4 p.m. for a scheduled arrival the following day at 9 a.m. In practice, however, the trains usually run late. In May 2021, for example, only 31 percent of Auto Trains arrived on time, mostly because of interference by freight trains that have preference over much of the route.

Smoking was banned on the Auto Train on June 1, 2013; it had been banned on most Amtrak trains since 1994 and on every train except the Auto Train since 2004.

Auto Train operates on the same route it and its predecessor have always used; the entire route is owned by CSX Transportation except for the southern 16 miles (26 km), which are owned by SunRail.

== Ridership ==
Ridership declined through 2019, then dropped 30.3% to 163,556 in 2020, the first year of the COVID-19 pandemic. It recovered somewhat in 2021 to 199,414 and then set a new ridership record in 2022 with 279,019 passengers. This figure rose slightly once more in 2023, with another new record set of 283,646 riders.

The Auto Train has the highest revenue of any Amtrak long-distance train. The train had total revenue of US$75,169,554 in FY2016, down 7.9% from FY2015.

Traffic by fiscal year (October–September)
| | Ridership | Change over previous year | Ticket Revenue | Change over previous year |
|---|---|---|---|---|
| 2007 | 217,822 | - | $52,883,481 | - |
| 2008 | 234,839 | ▲7.81% | $58,154,402 | ▲9.96% |
| 2009 | 232,955 | ▼0.8% | $58,589,872 | ▲0.74% |
| 2010 | 244,252 | ▲4.84% | $61,012,324 | ▲4.13% |
| 2011 | 259,944 | ▲6.42% | $68,618,768 | ▲12.46% |
| 2012 | 264,096 | ▲1.59% | $72,518,200 | ▲5.68% |
| 2013 | 265,274 | ▲0.44% | $73,505,625 | ▲1.36% |
| 2014 | 274,445 | ▲3.45% | $78,831,501 | ▲7.24% |
| 2015 | 271,622 | ▼1.02% | $81,607,535 | ▲3.52% |
| 2016 | 238,448 | ▼12.21% | $75,169,554 | ▼7.88% |
| 2017 | 229,000 | ▼3.96% | - | - |
| 2018 | 224,837 | ▼1.81% | - | - |
| 2019 | 236,041 | ▲4.98% | - | - |
| 2020 | 163,556 | ▼30.3% | - | - |
| 2021 | 199,414 | ▲21.9% | - | - |
| 2022 | 279,019 | ▲39.9% | - | - |
| 2023 | 283,646 | ▲1.7% | | |
| 2024 | 266,586 | ▼-6.0% | $119,900,000 | - |

== Operations ==
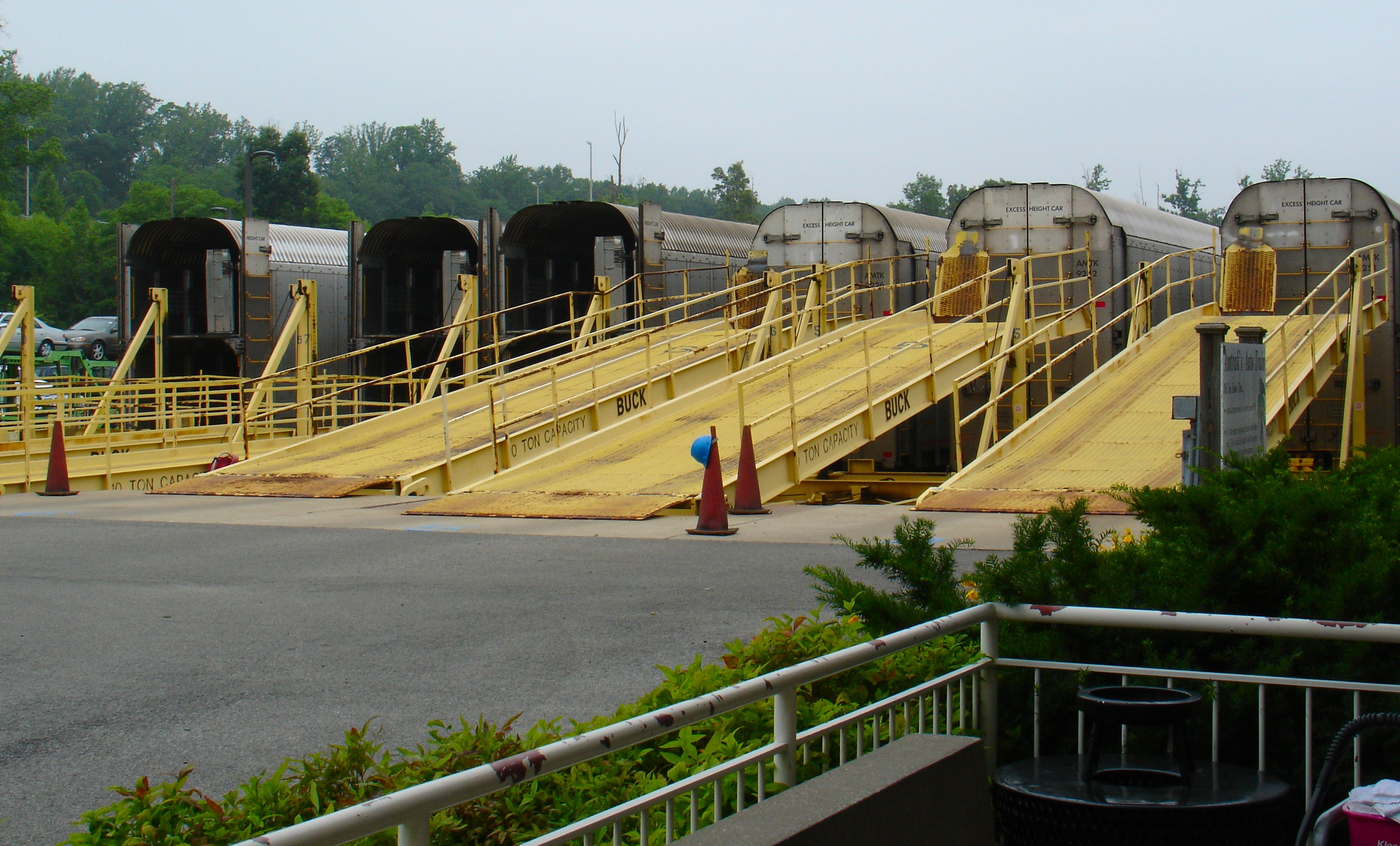
Autoracks lined up at their loading ramps at the Lorton station

The train operates every day. At 11:30 am, the station gates are opened to allow the vehicles into the vehicle staging area. Here, each vehicle is assigned a unique number, which is affixed to the driver's door magnetically. The vehicle is typically filmed to document existing dents and other damage, in case a damage claim is later filed. The passengers leave their vehicles here and take their carry-on bags with them into the station to await boarding. The vehicles are then staged near the autorack ramps by size and length for optimal loading order and are then loaded onto the autoracks. Motorcycle owners help tie their bikes down to a motorcycle carrier that is then loaded into the autorack. Passengers cannot access their vehicles during the trip.

Vehicles and passengers are accepted up until 3 p.m., after which the autoracks are closed and coupled together, the passenger cars are coupled together in the case of Sanford departures, and the autoracks are coupled to the rear of the consist. At 4 p.m., the train departs the station.

About 1 a.m., the train makes its sole scheduled stop, at the Florence, South Carolina, station, where a new engineer and conductors take over and the train takes on fuel and water. No passengers embark or disembark here, but it is considered a "smoke stop" and passengers are allowed to exit to "stretch their legs," smoke (prohibited on the train) and exercise service animals like dogs.

The schedule calls for the trains to arrive in Lorton and Sanford about 9 a.m. the next day. When the trains arrive on time, they have covered the 855-mile (1,376 km) journey in about 17 hours, at an average speed of about 50 miles per hour (80 km/h).

Passengers cannot immediately leave the train, as the autoracks are first decoupled from the consist, and in the case of the Sanford station, the passenger cars are split into two sections to fit on Sanford's shorter platforms. At this point, the passengers are then allowed to disembark and move to the auto claim area. Cleaning crews move into the train after passengers leave, and the train is re-supplied with food and water. The passenger car seat backs are flipped to allow everyone in coach to ride facing forward.

The autoracks are further split into three to six sections and each section is aligned with a loading ramp (see picture). The doors between each are opened, and connecting ramps are lowered to allow vehicles to move between cars. At this point vehicles begin to roll off the autoracks and to the claim area, where they are identified and announced by the vehicle number that was attached to the vehicle at the origin station. Vehicles are not unloaded in the same order they were loaded. It normally takes one hour to unload all vehicles from a full train.

The first 30 vehicles off belong to passengers who have paid an extra fee, a service Amtrak has offered by the name Priority Vehicle Offloading since April 2013. The fee has risen from $50 in 2016 to $60 in 2017 to $95 in 2023.

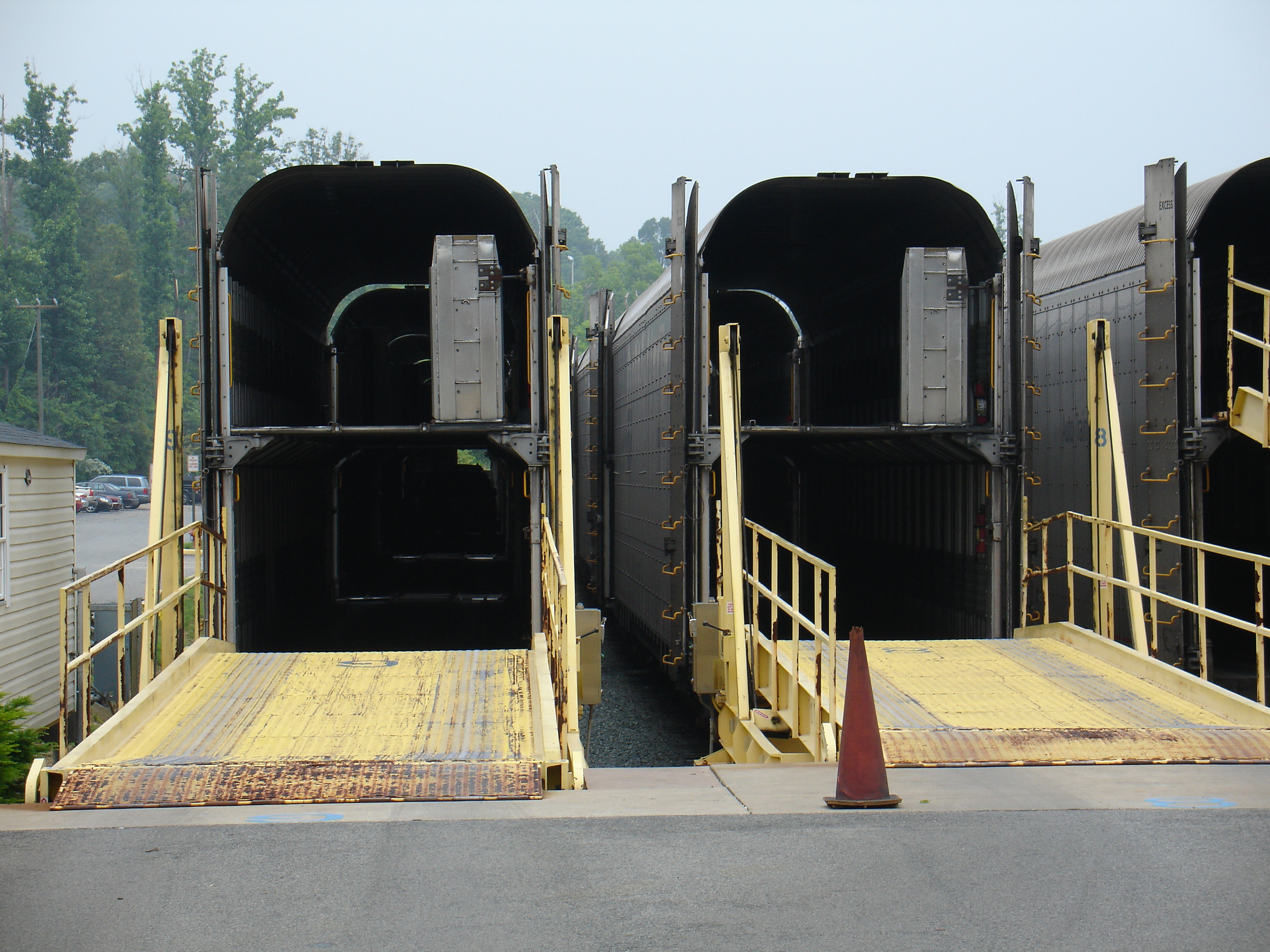
A look inside the autoracks

=== Lorton Terminal ===
Lorton, Virginia, is about a half-hour drive south of Washington, D.C., near Interstate 95 in Northern Virginia. Amtrak's new Lorton terminal opened in early 2000 as a replacement for the original station built during the 1970s, and features a large, modern waiting area with high glass walls. The station was designed by architect Hanny Hassan. The suspended sculpture in the lobby was designed by Patrick Sheridan. The platform is 1,480 feet (451 m) long.

Lorton was selected as site of the northern terminal because the 20-foot-2-inch-high (6.15 m) autoracks were too tall to pass through the First Street Tunnel into Washington, D.C.

=== Sanford Terminal ===
Sanford, Florida, is the southern terminus and is about a half-hour drive north of Orlando. The original facility was older and smaller than the terminal at Lorton. At Sanford, the Auto Train loads passengers on two tracks, as no one track is long enough to accommodate all the passenger railcars. Sanford's operation is unique in that a railroad crossing runs through the middle of the rail yard. This complicates some switching procedures and also requires a three-man yard conductor crew – conductor, assistant conductor, and a utility conductor – while operations at Lorton require only a conductor and assistant conductor. Both yards operate with one engineer. Sanford serves as the main mechanical and maintenance location for Auto Train, with diesel and car shops to service the fleet. The city of Sanford provides a shuttle bus to the historic district departing every 20 minutes between 1:00 pm and 3:00 pm free of charge on all days except Sundays and certain major holidays.

=== Consist ===
The Auto Train operates using Amtrak's fleet of bi-level Superliner equipment. A typical consist includes two or three locomotives, followed by a transition sleeper car for crew use, six sleeping cars for first-class passengers, a sightseer lounge car and a full-service dining car, both for first-class passengers, four coach cars, a café/lounge car for coach passengers, and more than 23 autoracks for transporting vehicles.

Superliner sleeping cars contain a mix of accommodations, including deluxe bedrooms on the upper level, roomettes on both levels, a family bedroom, and an accessible bedroom. Coach cars are equipped with reclining seats on both levels. The sightseer lounge car features wrap-around windows on the upper level and a café on the lower level.

At approximately 3/4 mile (1.2 km; 4,000 ft) in length, the Auto Train is among the longest passenger trains in the world.

== See also ==
- Car shuttle train
- Motorail
- LeShuttle (for cars and trucks)

== Bibliography ==
- Ely, Wally (2009). Auto-Train. Images of Rail (1st ed.). Arcadia Publishing. ISBN 978-0-7385-6785-3.
