= Auto-Train Corporation =

Defunct, privately owned railroad in the United States

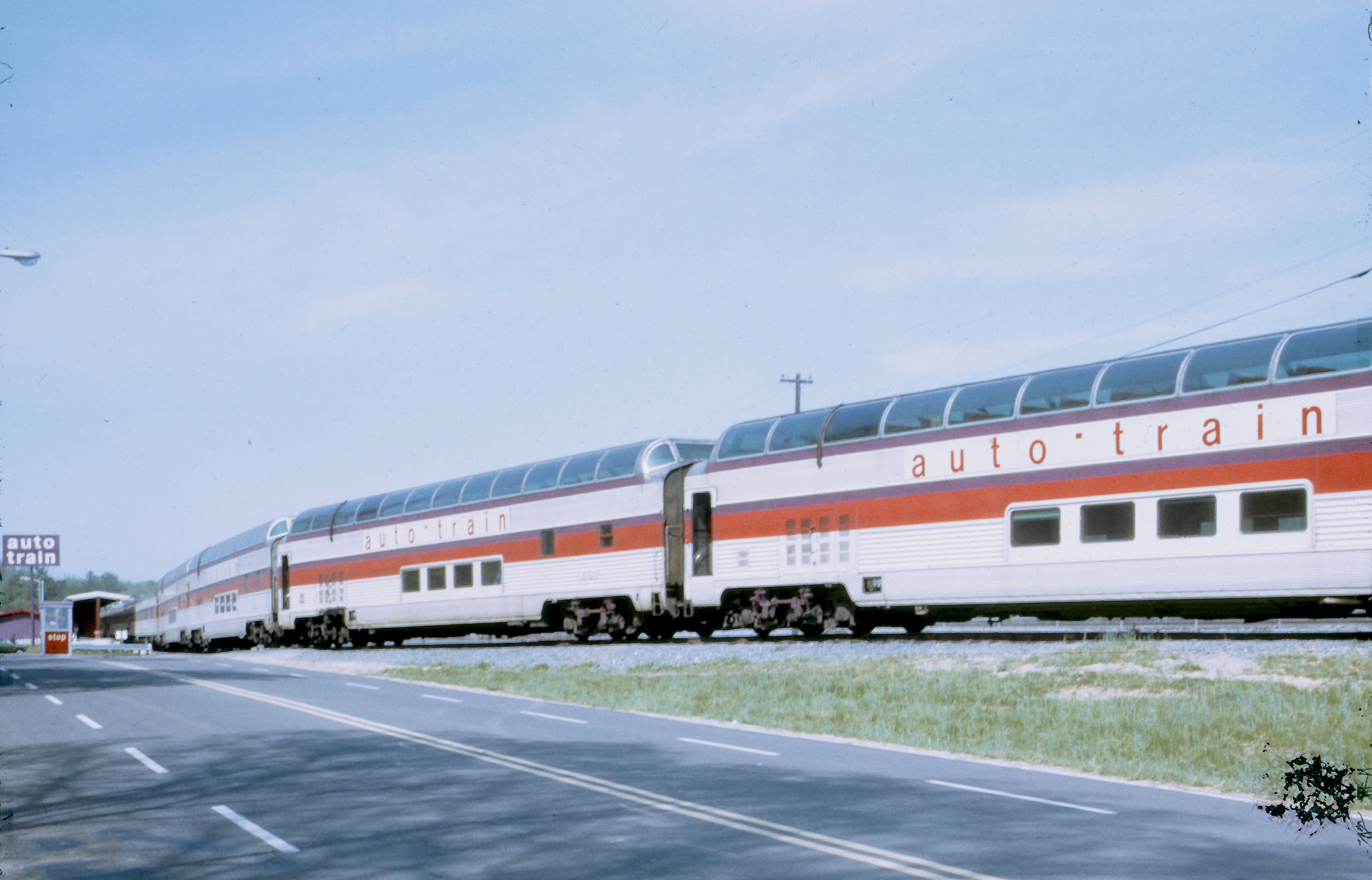
- Auto-Train ex-Santa Fe "Big Dome" dome cars at Lorton, Virginia in 1973

Overview
- Service type: Inter-city rail
- Status: Defunct
- Locale: Eastern Seaboard
- First service: December 6, 1971 (Sanford-Lorton); 1974 (Sanford-Louisville)
- Last service: April 1981 (Sanford-Lorton); 1977 (Sanford-Louisville)
- Successor: Amtrak Auto Train
- Former operator: Auto-Train Corporation

Route
- Termini: Lorton, Virginia; Louisville, Kentucky (1974-1977); Sanford, Florida

On-board services
- Observation facilities: Dome cars

Technical
- Rolling stock: See Rolling stock
- Track gauge: 4 ft 8 1/2 in (1,435 mm) standard gauge

Auto-Train
Overview
- Founders: Eugene K. Garfield
- Reporting mark: AUCX
- Dates of operation: 1971–1981
- Successor: Amtrak (1983)

Technical
- Track gauge: 1,435 mm (4 ft 8 1/2 in)

Auto-Train Corporation (reporting mark AUCX), stylized auto-train, was a privately owned passenger railroad that operated from 1971 to 1981. Its trains included autorack cars, enabling passengers to bring their own vehicles on their journey. The company used its own rolling stock, and traveled on rails leased from major railroads. It served central Florida from points in the Mid-Atlantic region near Washington, D.C., and the Midwest near Louisville, Kentucky. The company failed after 10 years despite the popularity of the service on its primary route, which parallels busy Interstate 95 in five states along the eastern U.S. coast.

After a hiatus, a similarly named and operated service, Auto Train, began under the government-financed Amtrak in 1983, which became one of the railroad's most popular services.

== History ==
An idea of Auto-Train Corporation founder Eugene K. Garfield, a former employee of the U.S. Department of Transportation, the novel approach allowed families to relax en route and save the expense and unfamiliarity of a rental car on arrival. The Auto-Train consists included passenger cars, autoracks, and a caboose. Although the company had its own locomotives and rolling stock, Auto-Train Corporation trains initially operated on Seaboard Coast Line (SCL) and Richmond, Fredericksburg & Potomac (RF&P) tracks.

Auto-Train Corporation's new service began operations on December 6, 1971, between Lorton, Virginia, and Sanford, Florida. The service was popular with travelers. Soon, Auto-Train entrepreneurs sought to expand into other markets, and established a short-lived service between Louisville and Sanford, Florida. In 1978, the company announced plans for a service in Mexico between Nuevo Laredo and Querétaro City.

Lack of success from the Louisville expansion, high crew costs, and several accidents put Garfield's company into bankruptcy. Auto-Train Corporation ended its services in late April 1981.

=== Amtrak revival ===
Operating for almost 10 years, Auto-Train had developed a popular following, particularly among older travelers. No one else offered a similar service until, after a gap of almost two years, service was revived by Amtrak (the National Railroad Passenger Corporation), as their Auto Train service.

== Rolling stock ==
=== Locomotives ===
Auto-Train used 13 GE U36B locomotives (4 additional units were ordered but were never delivered due to financial issues) as the primary motive power for its trains. Also included in the locomotive roster were Baldwin S-12, Baldwin VO-1000, and ALCO S-2 locomotives that were used as switchers in the terminal stations.

=== Dome cars ===
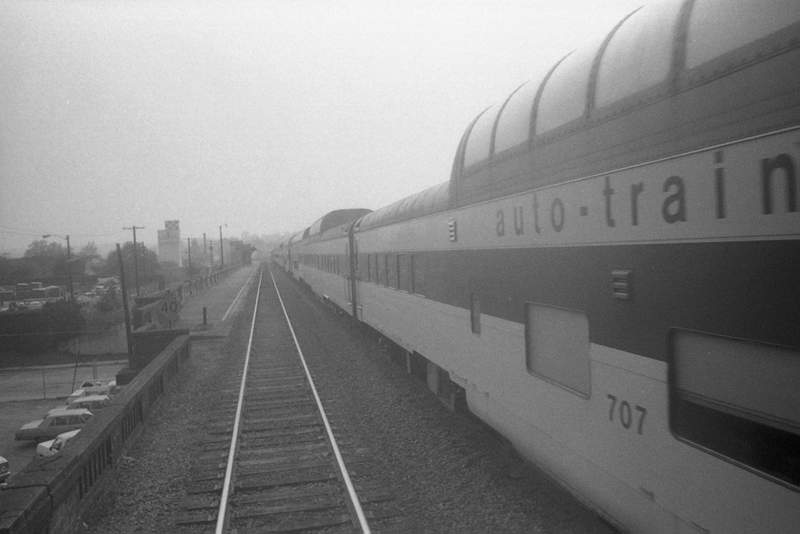
Auto-Train 707, a "Maxi-Dome" coach, in 1978

Auto-Train acquired a significant number of dome cars. So many, in fact, that in 1974 the Auto-Train did not roster any conventional coaches. These included seven ex-Western Pacific Vista Domes, each seating 36, which Auto-Train called "Mini-Domes". These had previously run on the California Zephyr. It also acquired all but one of the Santa Fe's Big Domes (six dormitory-lounges and seven of eight full lounges) and the majority of the Union Pacific's Astra Dome fleet: seven coaches, nine dining cars, and 14 lounge-observation cars. Two of the Big Dome lounges and two of the Astra Dome lounges were rebuilt as "Night Club" cars. The remainder of the Astra Domes were dubbed "Maxie-Domes", as opposed to the "Mini-Domes".

=== Food service cars ===
Auto-Train acquired a wide variety of food-service cars. These included ex-Seaboard kitchen-dormitory cars, ex-Seaboard dining cars rebuilt as buffet cars, and five Norfolk and Western and Western Pacific coaches which were also rebuilt as buffet cars.

=== Sleeping cars ===
Sleeping cars acquired by Auto-Train included six ex-Santa Fe Regal series sleeping cars (four bedrooms, four compartments, two drawing rooms), five ex-Union Pacific Ocean series sleeping cars (five bedrooms, two compartment, two drawing rooms), and three ex-Seaboard sleepers (five bedrooms, one compartment, four sections, four roomettes).

=== Nonpassenger stock ===
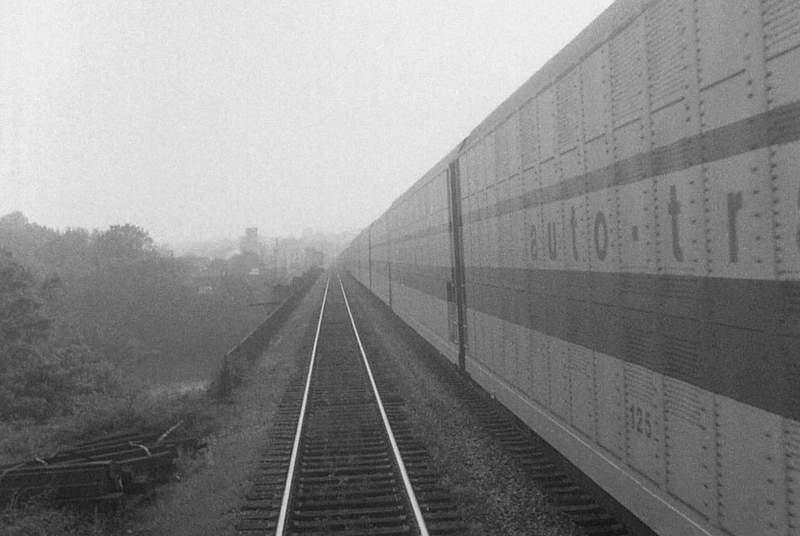
Auto-Train 125, an autorack, in 1978

The centerpieces of the Auto-Train were the 62 ex-Canadian National bilevel autoracks, which were acquired between 1971 and 1973. The passenger equipment acquired by Auto-Train used steam heat, so the company also acquired steam generator cars. These were mostly former Great Northern cars, but the Auto-Train also rebuilt several former Western Pacific and Santa Fe baggage cars into steam generator cars.

== See also ==
- Accompanied car train
- Motorail, a similar service in the United Kingdom

== Bibliography ==
- Ely, Wally (2009). Auto-Train. Images of Rail (1st ed.). Arcadia Publishing. ISBN 978-0-7385-6785-3.
