= Autorack =

Railway rolling stock used to transport automobiles

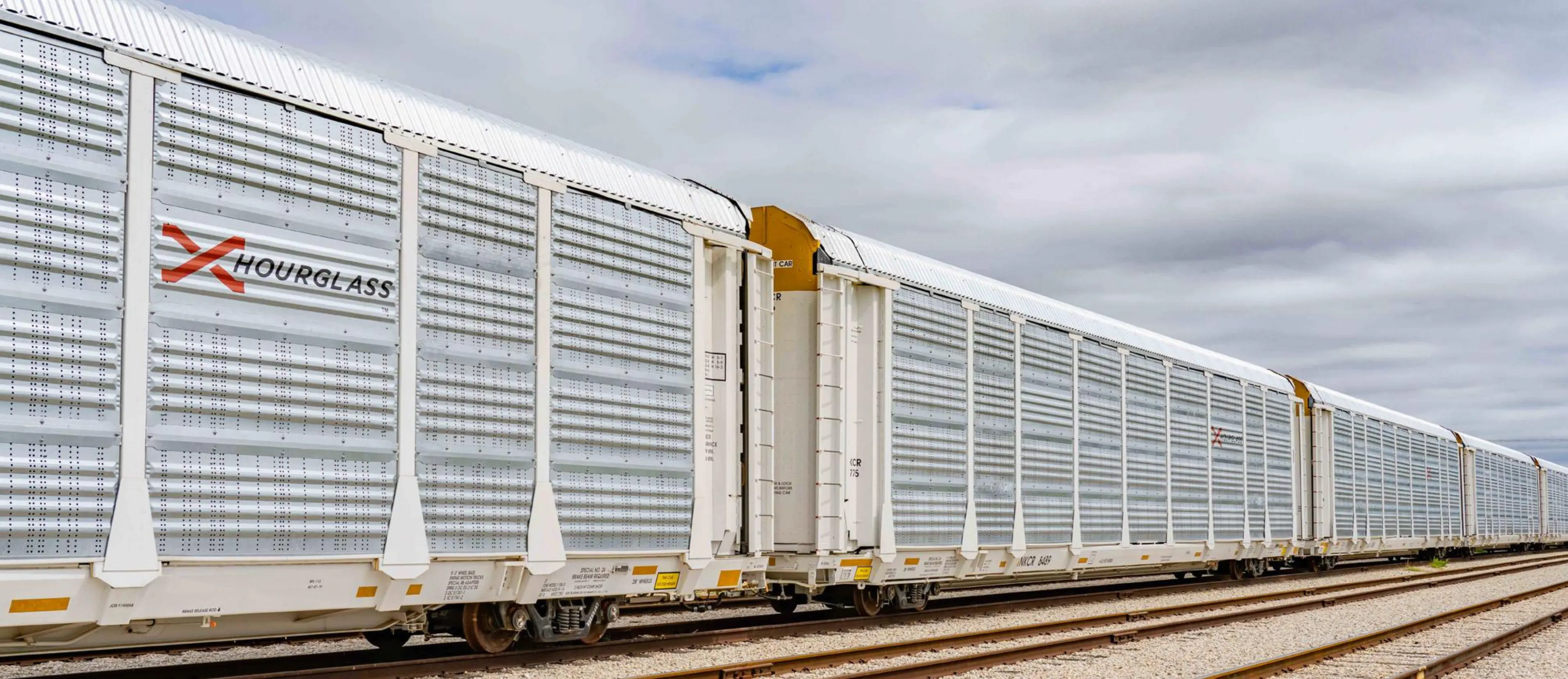
Autorack train car carries automobiles

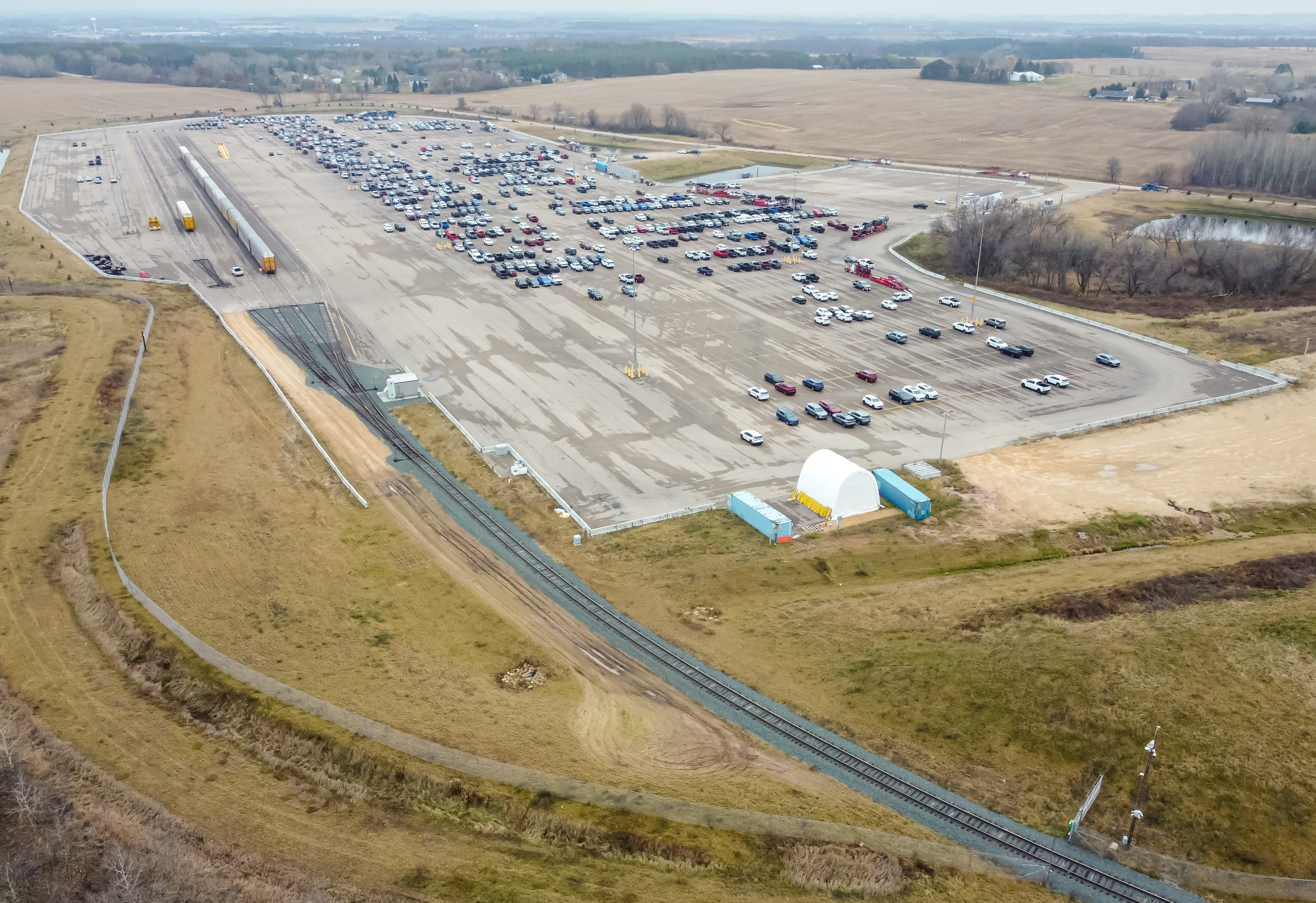
Autorack terminal in New Richmond, Wisconsin

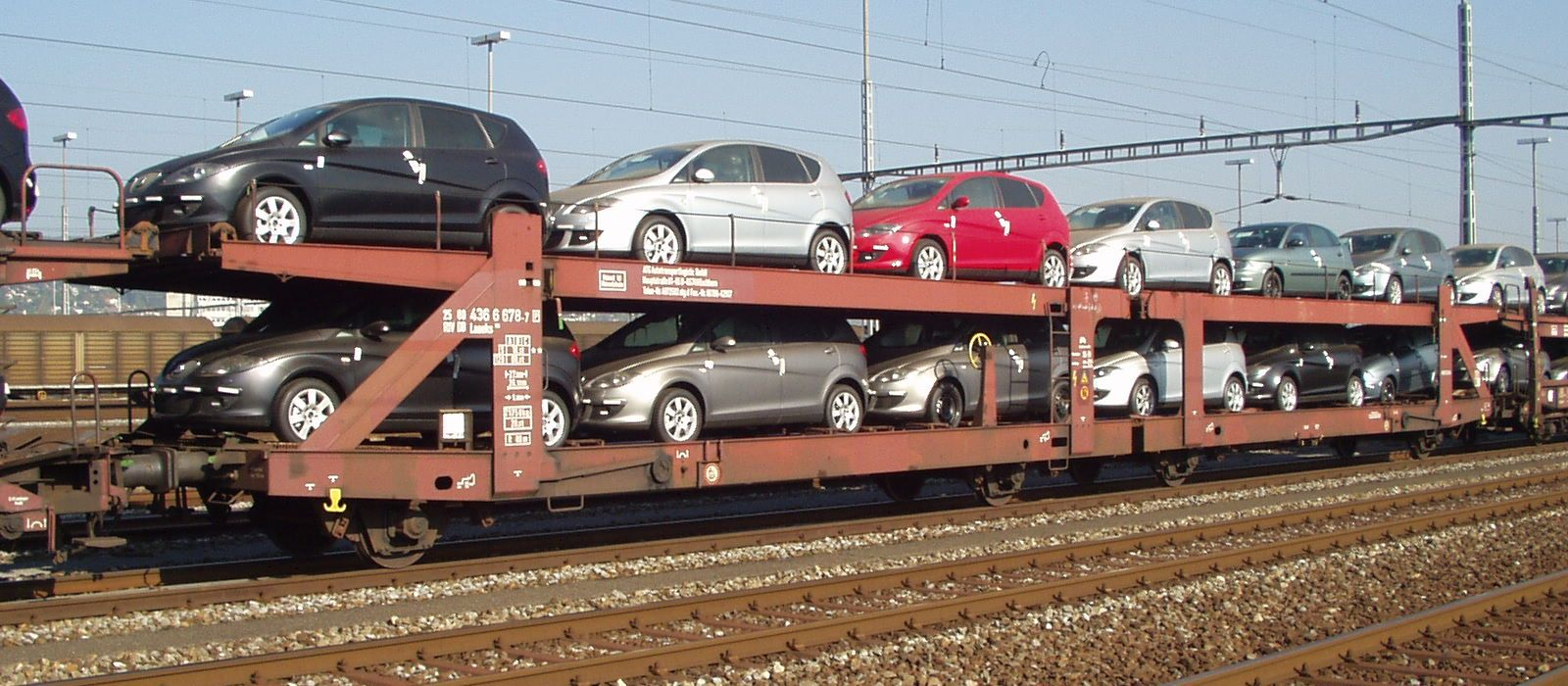
A German autorack similar to the original design with a full load of automobiles

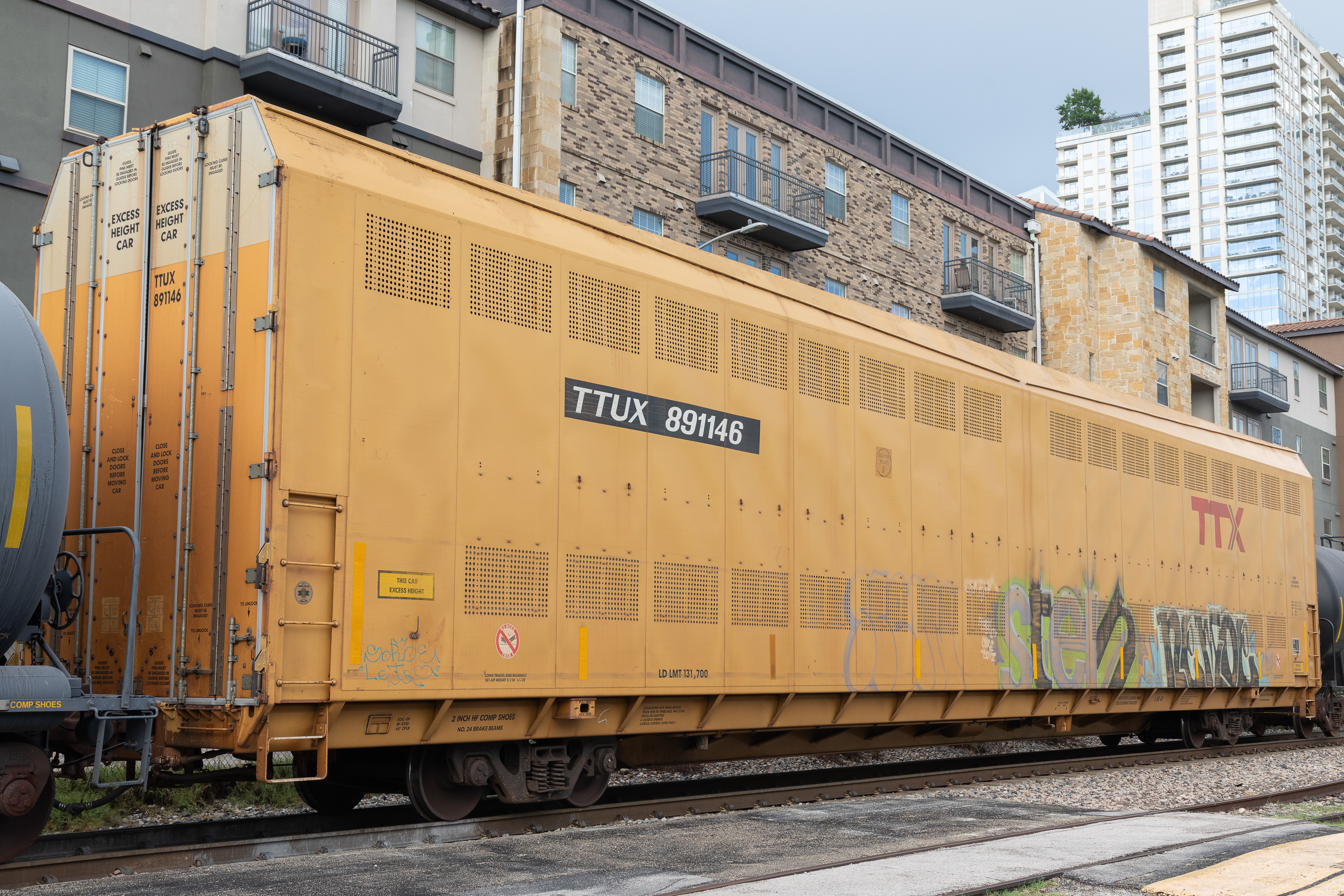
TTUX 891146, a "unilevel" auto rack used for transporting tall commercial vehicles such as vans.

An autorack, also known as an auto carrier (also car transporter outside the US), is a specialized piece of railroad rolling stock used to transport automobiles and light trucks. Autoracks are used to transport new vehicles from factories to automotive distributors, and to transport passengers' vehicles in car shuttles and motorail services, such as Amtrak's Auto Train route.

== History ==
In the early 20th century, when automobiles were still new technology, their production levels were low enough that they could be shipped in sufficient quantities in boxcars. Two to four automobiles would usually fit into one boxcar. But as the automobile industry grew in size, railroads found that they needed to modify the boxcars for more efficient loading. Some modifications included longer boxcars, larger sliding double side doors located near one end of the boxcar, or doors located on the boxcar ends.

These modifications helped, but the demand for new automobiles outpaced the railroads' abilities to build and modify boxcars in which to ship them. In 1923, the Grand Trunk Western Railroad experimented with modifying a group of 61-foot-long (18.59 m) wood-frame flat cars to increase their capacity by adding collapsible frames to allow for double-deck operation. The concept was not perfected and therefore failed to gain acceptance. In the 1940s and 1950s, some railroads experimented with automobile-loading assemblies that would lift one or more automobiles above others within a boxcar. The success of these assemblies was limited due to their special use and specific size; it proved uneconomical to maintain a fleet of these assemblies that could only be loaded into boxcars from the ends of the cars.

In the mid-1950s, in Germany, Volkswagen Beetle production was increasing beyond the capacity of highway trucks (autocarriers). Volkswagen engineers worked with German railroads to design a railroad car that was, in gist, an extra long version of a vehicle hauling trailer. The design they came up with was able to carry 10 vehicles on one car. VW's two-level flatcar design effectively became the first autorack, entering service circa 1954.

Also in 1954, Evans Products, a manufacturer of loading racks for carrying automobiles in conventional boxcars, developed a bi-level Auto-Loader superstructure with an elevating top deck capable of carrying six cars or light trucks on a typical flatcar. Two prototype units were constructed and mounted on conventional 53 ft (16 m) flat cars for field testing. NYC 500085 carried a semi-streamlined rack, while UP 5800 had a more utilitarian rack mounted. Neither design went into commercial production.

In 1956, Canadian National (CN) introduced an innovative group of bi-level auto carriers. These CN cars were similar to conventional boxcars, except they had a second floor and doors at both ends of the car instead of the usual side doors. They were huge by the standards of the time; the cars were 75 ft (22.86 m) long and could carry eight vehicles. These cars were a big success and helped lead to the development of today's enclosed auto racks.

In 1959, when 85 ft (25.91 m) flat cars capable of carrying two 40-foot (12.19 m) highway trailers in trailer-on-flatcar (TOFC), or "piggyback" service were introduced, new automobiles began to be shipped by rail loaded on highway auto-carrier trailers. Eight to ten autos could be carried per flat car in this manner. By 1960 several U.S. railroads were handling new automobiles in this way, including the CB&Q, C&NW, CRIP, D&H, D&RGW, ERIE/EL, GN, KCS, L&N, MILW, MKT, MP/TP, NP, SL-SF, SP, SSW, WAB and UP. The New York Central, which used the Flexi-Van system of transporting only the highway trailer body without the wheel assembly, developed a Flexi-Van automobile carrier rack.

Seeking a more efficient method, in February 1959 the Saint Louis-San Francisco Railroad (SL-SF, or Frisco) designed and built a prototype bi-level rack mounted on 42-foot (12.80 m) flat car SL-SF 95844. Satisfied that the basic concept was sound, the railroad contracted with Pullman-Standard to design and construct a full-size tri-level prototype. The result that rolled out of the Pullman plant on January 29, 1960, was SLSF 3000, an 83-foot (25.30 m) tri-level car capable of carrying 12 automobiles. When testing proved the car satisfactory the Frisco ordered 130 production cars, SL-SF 3001–3130, delivered by Pullman that August and September.

In 1960, the Frisco was not the only railroad experimenting with racks mounted on flat cars to carry automobiles. In January the Atchison, Topeka and Santa Fe Railway (ATSF) constructed a prototype trilevel rack mounted on 53-foot (16.15 m) flat ATSF 90082. Santa Fe's first production auto racks were 85-foot (25.91 m) trilevel Auto-Veyor units supplied by Dana-Spicer and Whitehead & Kales later in the year, both mounted on General American-built G85 cars. The Southern Pacific actually took delivery of the first Whitehead & Kales Auto-Pack tri-level racks in April, mounting them on General American-built Clejan and G85 cars. The slightly longer 85-foot (25.91 m) racks could carry 12 full size or 18 compact autos per car. Several other railroads quickly ordered their own auto racks from Dana and W&K or from American Car & Foundry, Darby Corporation, Evans Products, Paragon Bridge & Steel, or Thrall Car Manufacturing. The Santa Fe and Frisco also built some of their autoracks in their own car shops.

Curiously, in 1961 a German-built three-unit, articulated bilevel autorack was imported into the United States to demonstrate the German design to U.S. railroads. North American Car Corporation handled promotion of the car, which was marked NIFX 1200. The car rode on four single-axle trucks and was tested by the B&O, but no sales resulted.

Starting in this early period, most autoracks were mounted on flat cars leased from a leasing company, such as Trailer Train (see below), North American Car (NIFX marks), Merchants Despatch (MDAX marks), American Refrigerator Transit (MPFX marks), or Pullman's Transport Leasing Division (TLCX marks), but many roads also operated cars mounted on their own flat cars. Railroads known to have done so include ATSF, CN, CP, CR, CRR, D&RGW, FEC, GN, GTW, KCS, L&N, Monon, MP, N&W, RI, SCL, SLSF, SOO, Southern, SP, SSW, UP, WM, and WP.

== Transporting new automobiles ==
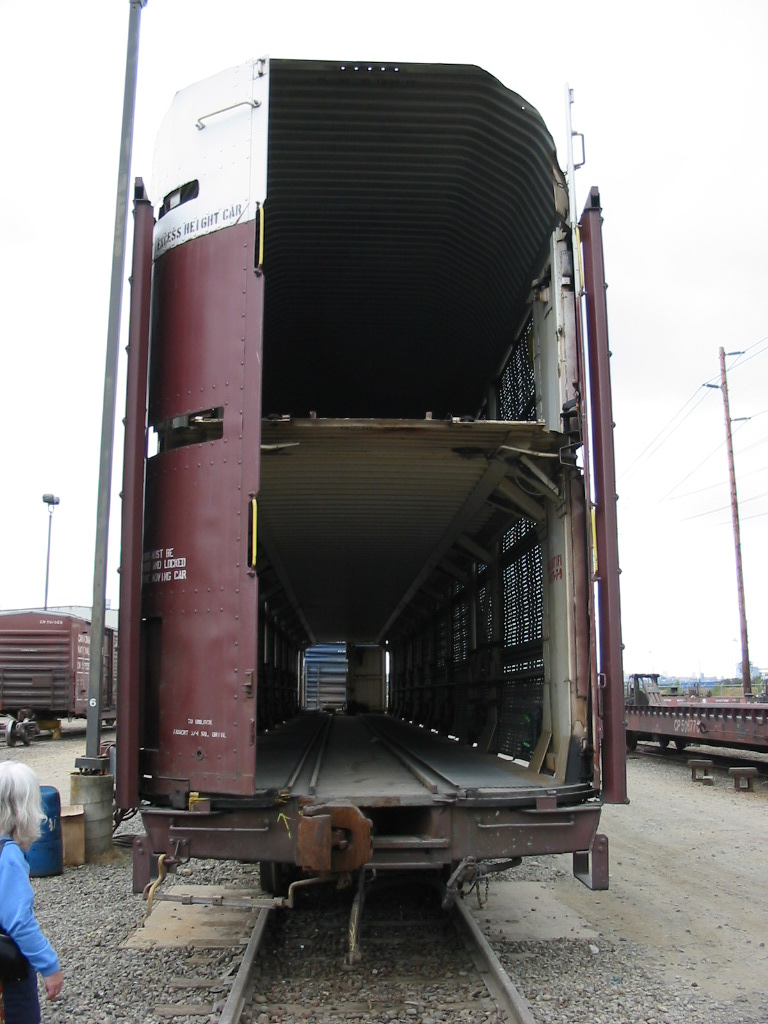
The open end of a bi-level autorack that is undergoing repairs

During the early 1960s, specially built auto carriers rapidly took over rail transportation of newly completed automobiles in North America. They carried more vehicles in the same space and were easier to load and unload than the boxcars formerly used. Ever-larger auto carriers and specialized terminals were developed by Norfolk and Western Railway (N&W) and other carriers. Autoracks were built in three-level configurations carrying automobiles, and with two-levels for vans and light trucks.

Autorack and flat car length quickly grew to 87 feet (26.52 m) and then 89 feet (27.13 m) to increase their loading capacity even further. This made them about as long as the average railroad passenger car of the time; if the cars were much longer, they would not be able to operate in interchange service due to clearance on curves.

A major problem left to solve was that the new autorack cars did not provide any protection from theft, vandalism, or severe weather. Individual railroads began installing mesh side screens and solid panels to their racks to protect the vehicles from impact and debris in the late 1960s, and by the early 1970s new racks were being delivered with these side panels. However, thieves and vagrants could still gain access to the automobiles. In 1973 the first fully enclosed racks with continuous side panels, end doors, and roofs were developed to address this problem. Whitehead & Kales, Ford, N&W and DT&I jointly developed a Snap-Pak prototype enclosed tri-level car, NW 400000. The car side was made up of overlapping perforated steel sheets. The ends were protected with two trifold doors, and a corrugated steel roof extended the full length of the car. A competing RailPac prototype was developed by Portec-Paragon, Chrysler, and several railroads. It featured mesh screen side panels, vertically sliding three-piece doors, and a similar roof. The Southern Railway and Greenville Steel Car developed a unique 124-foot (38 m) articulated three-unit Autoguard car with single-axle trucks, SOU 599000-599001.

The first production fully enclosed racks were delivered in late 1974 and early 1975. The Whitehead & Kales tri-level design, renamed Safe-Pak, was delivered to ATSF, CP, CRR, FEC, NW, SCL, SSW, UP, and WP, all of them riding on railroad-owned flats. Portec's RailPac design, developed in cooperation with Chrysler, was placed into service by ATSF, C&O, C&NW, D&RGW, GTW, N&W, RF&P, SLSF, SP, UP and several other roads, with most riding on leased Trailer Train flats. These two designs were refined during the late 1970s and by 1980 fully enclosed tri-levels accounted for roughly a third of the in-service fleet, however fully enclosed bi-levels lagged far behind.

Roofs were not added to all autoracks until the mid-1980s, as it took time for railroads with low overhead clearance routes to modify their bridge and tunnel clearances to accept them. Consequently, some roofless and even open tri-levels and bi-levels remained in service into the mid-to-late 1980s.

The number of manufacturers offering autoracks declined during the 1960s, 1970s and 1980s. Several firms simply exited the field, including AC&F, Evans, Dana, and Darby, while others were acquired by other builders. Pullman, after supplying the very first production tri-level autoracks to the Frisco, abandoned the field to concentrate on the flat cars that autoracks were mounted on, only to return briefly in 1976–1977 to build a few tri-levels for the B&O and Cotton Belt (SSW). Pacific Car & Foundry briefly produced a few racks at about the same time, as did Thrall. Whitehead & Kales, one of two dominant producers since the late 1960s, was acquired by Thrall in 1981. Paragon, the other leading rack-builder, was purchased by Portec in the early 1970s, which was in turn acquired by Thrall in 1985. Paragon's autorack designs were sold to Greenville Steel Car, also in 1985, which was itself acquired by Trinity Industries in 1986. Thrall itself was eventually acquired by Trinity as well in 2001. Currently autoracks are produced by TrinityRail, Greenbrier, Johnstown America, National Steel Car, and the Union Pacific Railroad.

=== Vert-A-Pac and Stac-Pac ===
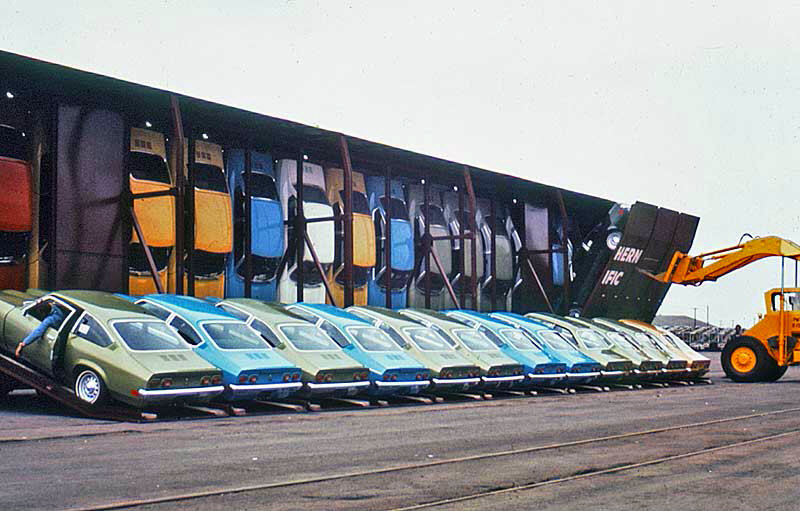
Chevy Vegas loaded on Vert-a-pac

Both railroads and automakers wanted to eliminate theft and damage from vandalism and weather, thus reducing shipping costs. They also wanted to increase the number of vehicles carried per rail car for the same reason. Toward that end, in 1968 General Motors and the Southern Pacific Railroad jointly began work on development of a radical new rail car designed to carry the Chevrolet Vega, a new compact car being developed by GM. Known as Vert-A-Pac, the rail cars would hold 30 Vegas in a vertical, nose-down position, versus 18 in normal tri-level autoracks. Each Vega was fitted with four removable, cast-steel sockets inserted into the undercarriage that locked into the hooks on the bottom-hinged doors that made up the car side.

The prototype car, SP 618000 was turned out in December 1968 and tested through 1969. Chevrolet conducted vibration and low-speed crash tests to make sure nose-down Vegas would not shift or be damaged in railcar collisions. Chevrolet's goal was to deliver Vegas topped with fluids and ready to drive to the dealership. To do this Vega engineers had to design a special engine oil baffle to prevent oil from entering the No. 1 cylinder, batteries had filler caps located high up on the rear edge of the case to prevent acid spilling, the carburetor float bowl had a special tube that drained gasoline into the vapor canister during shipment, and the windshield washer bottle stood at a 45-degree angle. Plastic spacers were wedged in beside the powertrain to prevent damage to engine and transmission mounts. The wedges were removed when cars were unloaded. The rail car doors were opened and closed by means of a forklift.

The first production Vert-A-Pacs entered service in April 1970; the last ones entered service in January 1973. Besides Southern Pacific, the Baltimore & Ohio, Burlington Northern, Denver & Rio Grande Western, Florida East Coast, Frisco, Illinois Central Gulf, Louisville & Nashville, Milwaukee Road, Missouri Pacific, Penn Central (under Merchants Despatch Transportation), Rock Island, Seaboard Coast Line, and Southern Railway operated Vert-A-Pacs. All were withdrawn from service at the end of the 1977 Vega model year and were reracked with conventional tri-level racks.

Another joint General Motors-Southern Pacific automobile rail car was the Stac-Pac. It was designed to carry 12 high-end Oldsmobile, Buick, and Cadillac models in four removable fully enclosed tri-level containers per 89-foot (27 m) flat car. The first production Stac-Pac cars entered service in October 1971. Besides SP and its Cotton Belt subsidiary (SSW), Stac-Pac flat cars were contributed to the pool by the Santa Fe and Trailer Train, with the containers being supplied by ATSF, BN, D&RGW, FEC, MILW, PC (MDT), RI, Southern Railway, SP, Cotton Belt Route, Union Pacific, and by General Motors itself. All of the cars and containers were withdrawn from service at the end of the 1976 model year.

=== Trailer Train Company ===
Although railroads were just beginning to see the advantages that autoracks delivered in the 1960s, most North American railroads were reluctant to invest in such specially built equipment. The Trailer Train Company, organized by the Pennsylvania Railroad and the Norfolk and Western Railway in 1955, stepped in to ease the railroads' financial burden a bit. Trailer Train purchased the flat cars from the rail car manufacturers, and the railroads that wanted to operate autoracks, purchased the racks that were installed on those flat cars. Such cars were easily spotted at trackside due to the reporting marks identifying Trailer Train on the flat car portion of the car and the railroad's logo (usually much larger) in the upper portion of the rack.

This arrangement worked so well that nearly every autorack operating in the US was owned by a railroad, with only a few exceptions. Trailer Train became TTX Company in 1991; since then many railroads have themselves purchased the flat cars on which the racks were installed and TTX has itself expanded into purchasing and leasing out other railroad rolling stock. The development of enclosed autoracks also helped make several other innovative services work well.

=== New designs and current usage ===
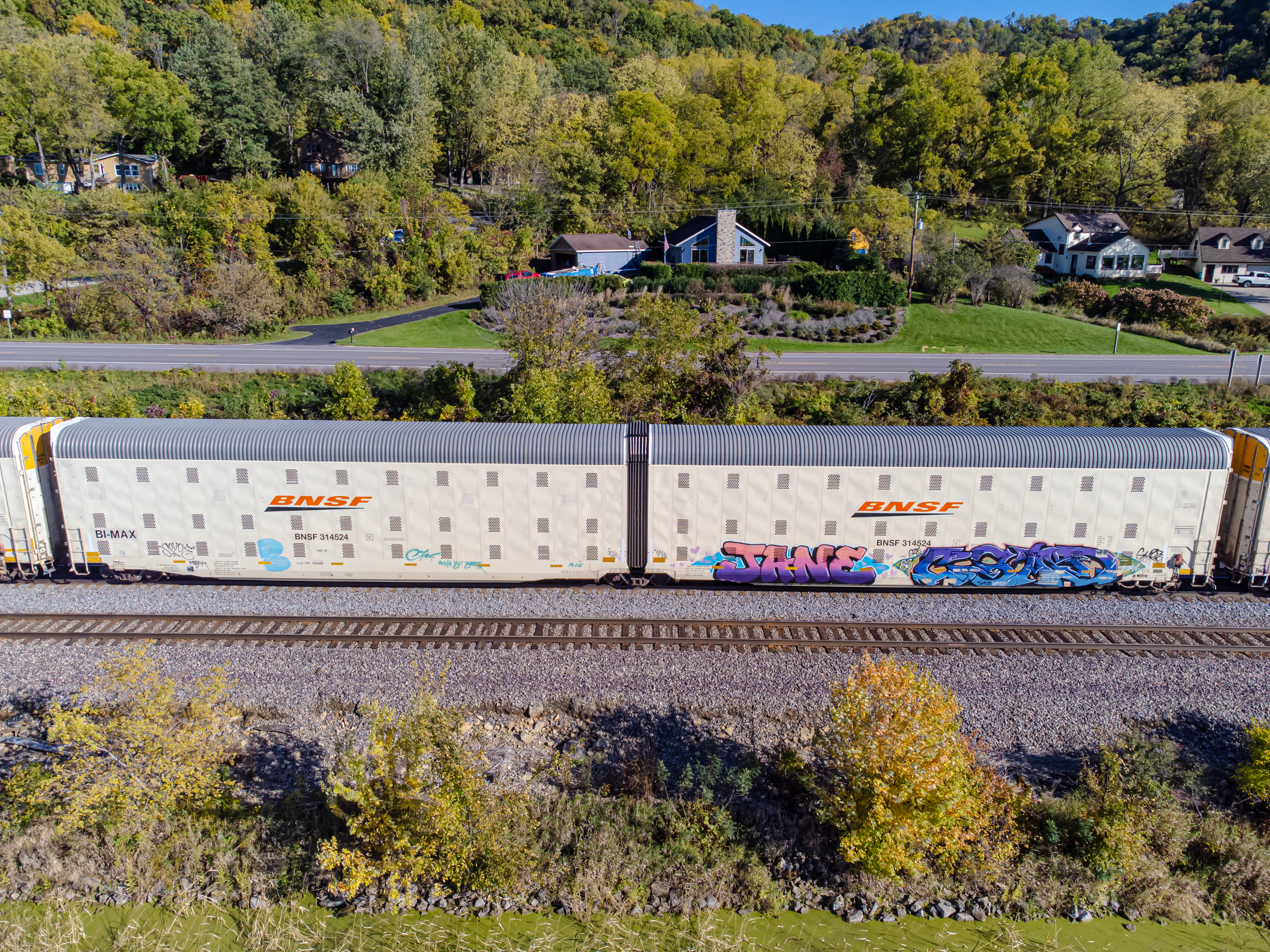
Articulated auto-rack

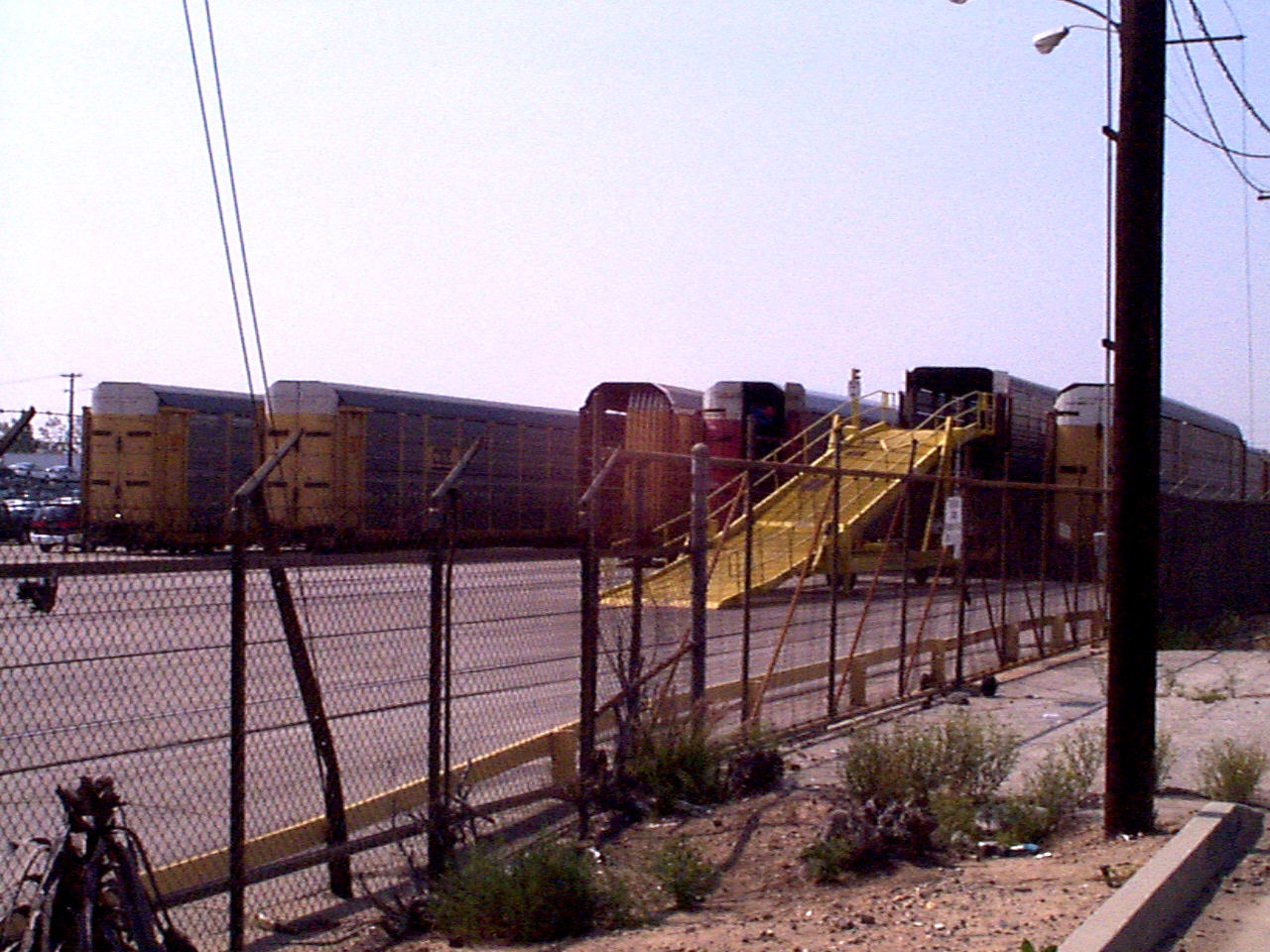
Autoracks wait to be unloaded in a BNSF Railway facility in Los Angeles, California.

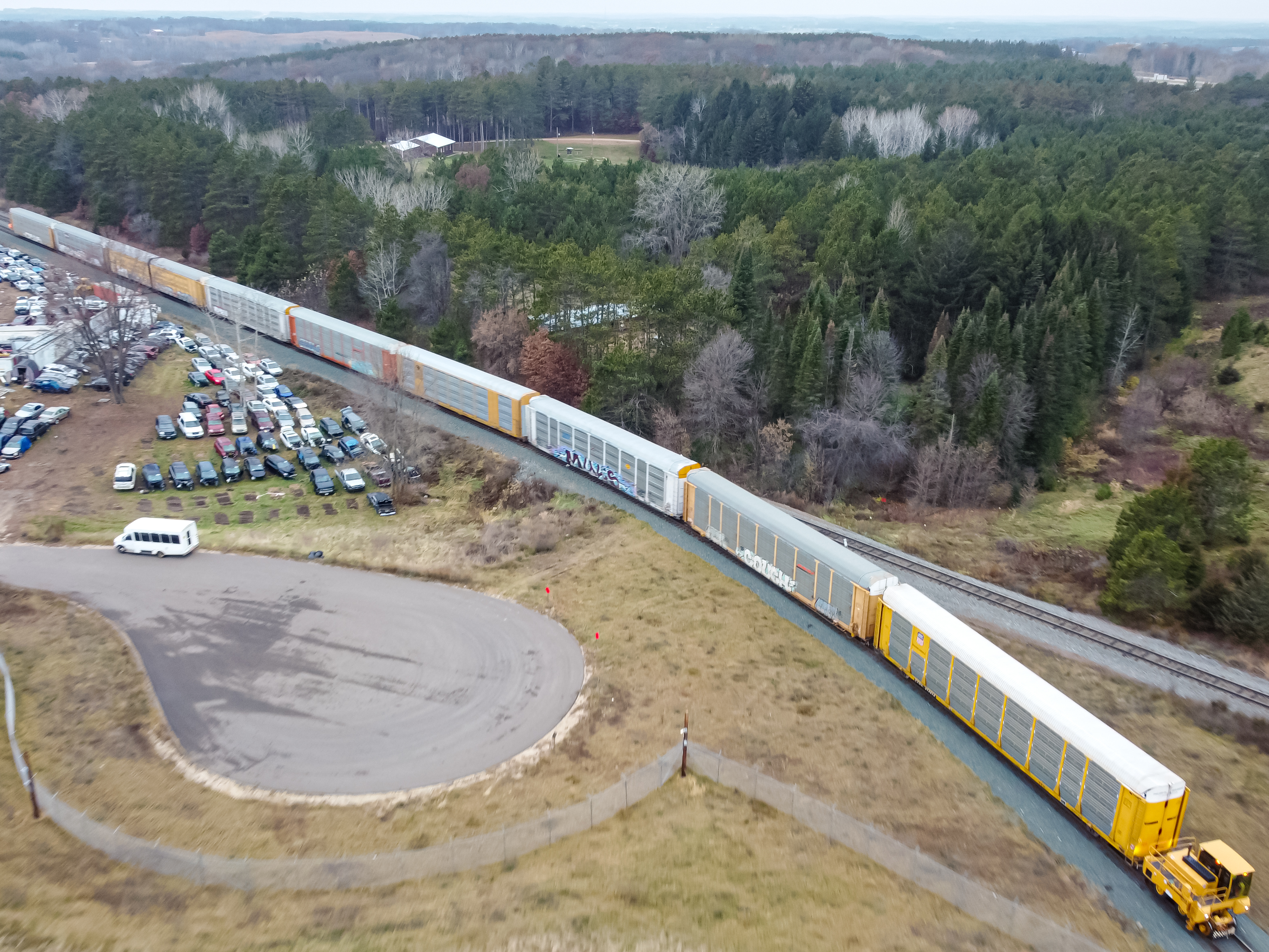
Autorack terminal switching handler

Railroads of today are still grappling with the problem of loading more and larger vehicles onto autoracks. One popular solution is to create a double-length car that is articulated over a single middle truck so that each half of the car is about the same length as a conventional autorack. These cars, which can be seen in operation on many of the railroads of the western US (but also seen occasionally in the Great Lakes and Southern Ontario), are brand named AutoMax cars. These cars, built by Gunderson (a subsidiary of The Greenbrier Companies) measure 145 ft 4 in (44.3 m) long and 20 ft 3 in (6.17 m) tall; they feature adjustable interior decks to carry up to 22 light trucks and minivans. Thrall produced a competing articulated two-unit design.

For greater flexibility and to improve car utilization, single-unit autoracks are being built that allow the number of loading levels, or decks, to be easily changed between bilevel (two) and trilevel (three), depending on which is in demand at the time. Greenbrier calls their version of this multilevel concept the Multi-Max, while the Union Pacific Railroad builds their own version, called the AutoMax.

The railroads have become the primary long-distance transporter of newly completed automobiles. Using the enclosed tri-level autoracks, they are able to provide lower costs as well as greater protection from in-transit damage (such as that which may occur due to weather and traffic conditions on unenclosed truck semi-trailers). When the railroad companies went from the open autoracks to the enclosed, they were able to reduce freight damage claims. The enclosed rail cars prevented the autos from getting damaged from falling or thrown rocks, bullets and other forms of vandalism. They also stopped the theft of autos and parts from autos and kept hobos from living in the automobiles.

Autoracks are also used to transport newly manufactured passenger cars and vans in Europe and Asia. In Europe, rail cars used for this purpose include but are not limited to CRRC and Ermewa cars operated by DB Cargo and cars operated by Autolink.

== Combining autoracks and passenger cars ==
=== Australia ===
In March 1972 the Western Australian Government Railways introduced the first motorail services in Australia on services from Perth to Albany, Bunbury, Geraldton and Mullewa. In August 1972 the Victorian Railways introduced a motorail on The Vinelander between Melbourne and Mildura. In March 1973 the Public Transport Commission introduced a motorail service on the Gold Coast Motorail between Sydney and Murwillumbah. In July 1973 a motorail service was introduced on the Southern Aurora between Sydney and Melbourne.

In October 1976 a motorail service was introduced on the Indian Pacific and Trans-Australian between Port Pirie and Perth. In October 1988 it was extended to operate on the service throughout to Sydney. The motorail service was curtailed to operate between Adelaide and Perth in November 2015. In November 1978, a motorail service was introduced on The Overland between Adelaide and Melbourne.

In December 1980 a motorail service was introduced by Australian National on The Ghan between Adelaide and Alice Springs. In April 1986, the first motorail service in Queensland was introduced by Queensland Rail on The Queenslander between Brisbane and Cairns. In June 1986 a motorail service was introduced on the Brisbane Limited between Sydney and Brisbane. In October 1987 the State Rail Authority introduced a motorail service on the Intercapital Daylight between Sydney and Melbourne.

In February 1992, Queensland Rail introduced motorail services on The Sunlander between Brisbane and Cairns and in February 1993 the Spirit of the Outback between Brisbane and Longreach.

=== Europe ===
- Car shuttle train
- Eurotunnel Shuttle

=== United States ===
A rail transport service where passengers can take their automobile along with them on their journey is known as an "Auto Train" in North America and as a "Motorail" in Australia and Europe. Passengers are carried in normal passenger cars or in sleeping cars on longer journeys, while their vehicles are loaded into autoracks, car carriers, or flatcars.

==== Auto-Train Corporation ====
On December 6, 1971, Auto-Train Corporation introduced a new and innovative rail transportation service for both passengers and their automobiles in the United States, operating scheduled service between Lorton, Virginia (near Washington DC) and Sanford, Florida, near Orlando.

The Auto Train offered an alternative to motorists who would otherwise have to drive their automobiles the 855-mile (1,376 km) distance along the East Coast of the United States. For vacationers with destinations at one or more of the many popular tourist attractions of Florida, the Auto Train service offered two advantages:

1. avoid the long automobile ride on busy Interstate 95 in Virginia, North Carolina, South Carolina, Georgia, and Florida
2. have the convenience of using their own automobile upon arrival.

From the beginning in 1971, the same year Amtrak began service on purely passenger routes in the United States, a key feature of Auto-Train's new service was the use of autoracks, which were former Canadian National transcontinental bi-level, enclosed autorack boxcars. These were augmented by new tri-level auto-racks built by Southern Iron & Equipment in 1976.

The privately owned service became very popular, but after 10 years of operation, and some costly attempts to expand the service elsewhere, such as a schedule between Florida and Chicago, Illinois, Auto-Train Corporation entered bankruptcy, and service ended in April 1981.

==== Amtrak's Auto Train ====
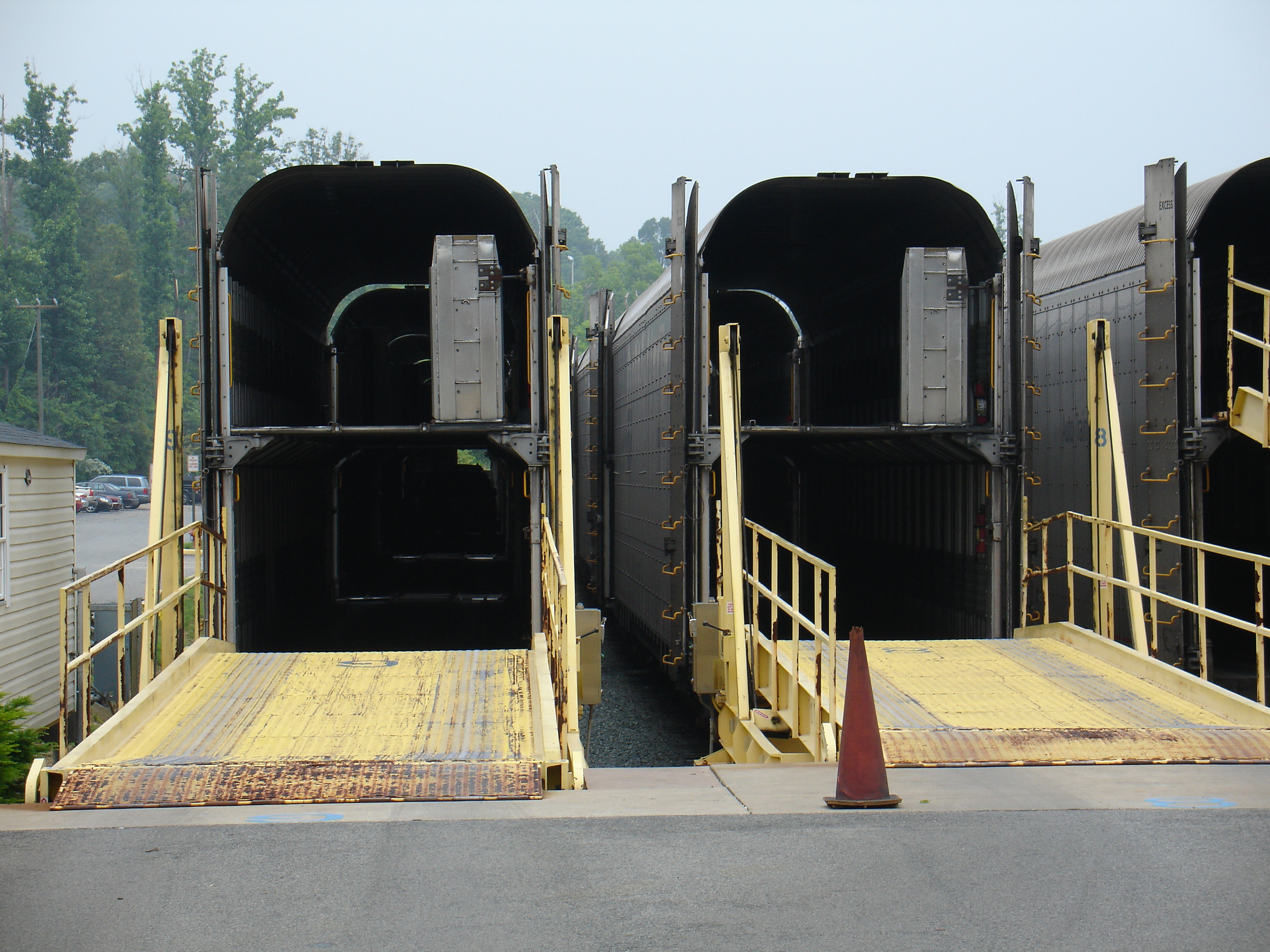
Modern autoracks in use on Amtrak's Auto Train

Auto Train service between Virginia and Florida was resumed by Amtrak in 1983. Amtrak, a federally chartered corporation which operates most intercity passenger trains in the United States, continued to use Auto-Train's autoracks as an important portion of its service. These were supplemented with new bilevels built by Johnstown America in 2004 and 2005.

In current operation of Amtrak's Auto Train, there are two trains in operation simultaneously. The autoracks normally run on the rear of Auto Train consists, which stretch over a three quarters of a mile, and are a familiar sight on CSX tracks on the east coast.

==== Whittier Shuttle ====
In the mid-1960s, the Alaska Railroad began offering a vehicle shuttle service utilizing standard flat cars and passenger cars. Dubbed the "Whittier Shuttle," it operated in Alaska through the Anton Anderson Memorial Tunnel under Maynard Mountain between a stop just off the Seward Highway near the former town of Portage and the small port town of Whittier, Alaska, which was also a port of call for the Alaska Marine Highway ferry system.

As traffic to Whittier increased, the shuttle became insufficient, leading to a project to convert the existing railroad tunnel into a single-lane combination highway and railway tunnel which was opened to traffic on June 7, 2000. At a length of 13,300 feet (4,053.8 m), it is the second-longest highway tunnel and the longest combined rail and highway tunnel in North America.

== See also ==
- Car carrier trailer
- Loading gauge § Freight, which gives a maximum height of 20 feet 3 inches (6.17 m) in AAR Plate-K for Autoracks

== Sources ==
- White, John H. Jr. (1993). The American Railroad Freight Car: From the Wood-Car Era to the Coming of Steel. Baltimore: Johns Hopkins University Press. ISBN 0-8018-4404-5. OCLC 26130632.
