= Motorail =

Train on which passengers can take their car

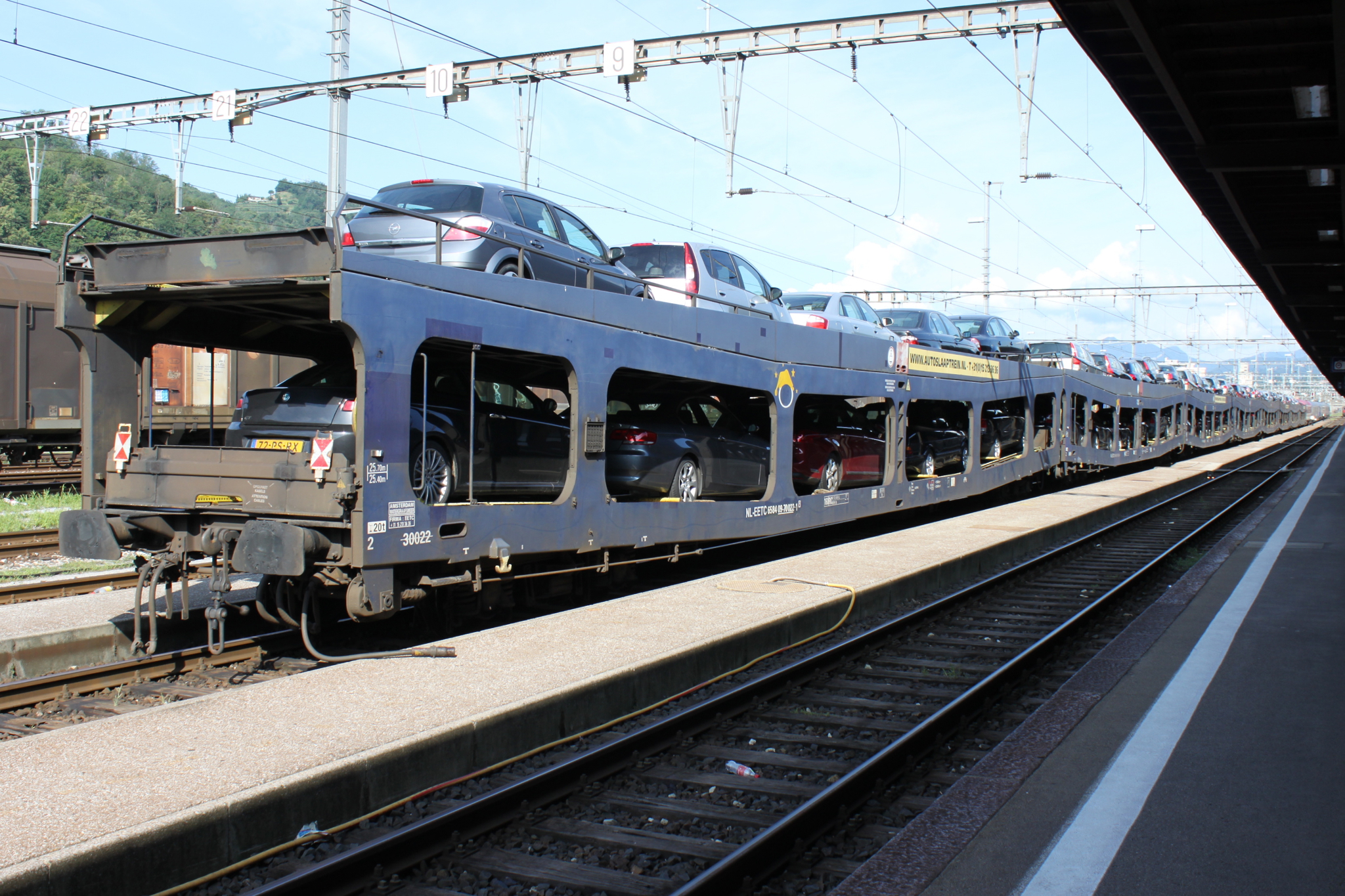
A motorail in Italy

A motorail train or accompanied car train (ACT) is a passenger train on which passengers can take their automobile along with them on their journey. Passengers are carried in normal passenger carriages or in sleeping carriages on longer journeys, while the cars are loaded into autoracks, car-carriers, or flatcars that normally form part of the same train.

Motorail services are not the same as car shuttle trains or car-carrying train services. Car shuttle trains usually operate over relatively short distances, on lines passing through a rail tunnel and connecting two places not easily accessible to each other by road. On car shuttle train services, unlike on motorail services, the occupants of the road vehicles being carried on the train usually stay with their vehicle throughout the rail journey.

== Examples ==
=== Europe ===
In Europe, many motorail connections are running cross-border between different European countries. To be mentioned are trains between Austria—Germany, Austria—Italy, Germany—Italy, Czech Republic—Slovakia and Serbia—Montenegro. Some domestic services exist as well. Domestic motorail trains are running within Germany, Austria, Slovakia, Slovenia and Finland.

Almost all motorail services are offered in connection with overnight trains with sleeping cars.

==== Austria ====
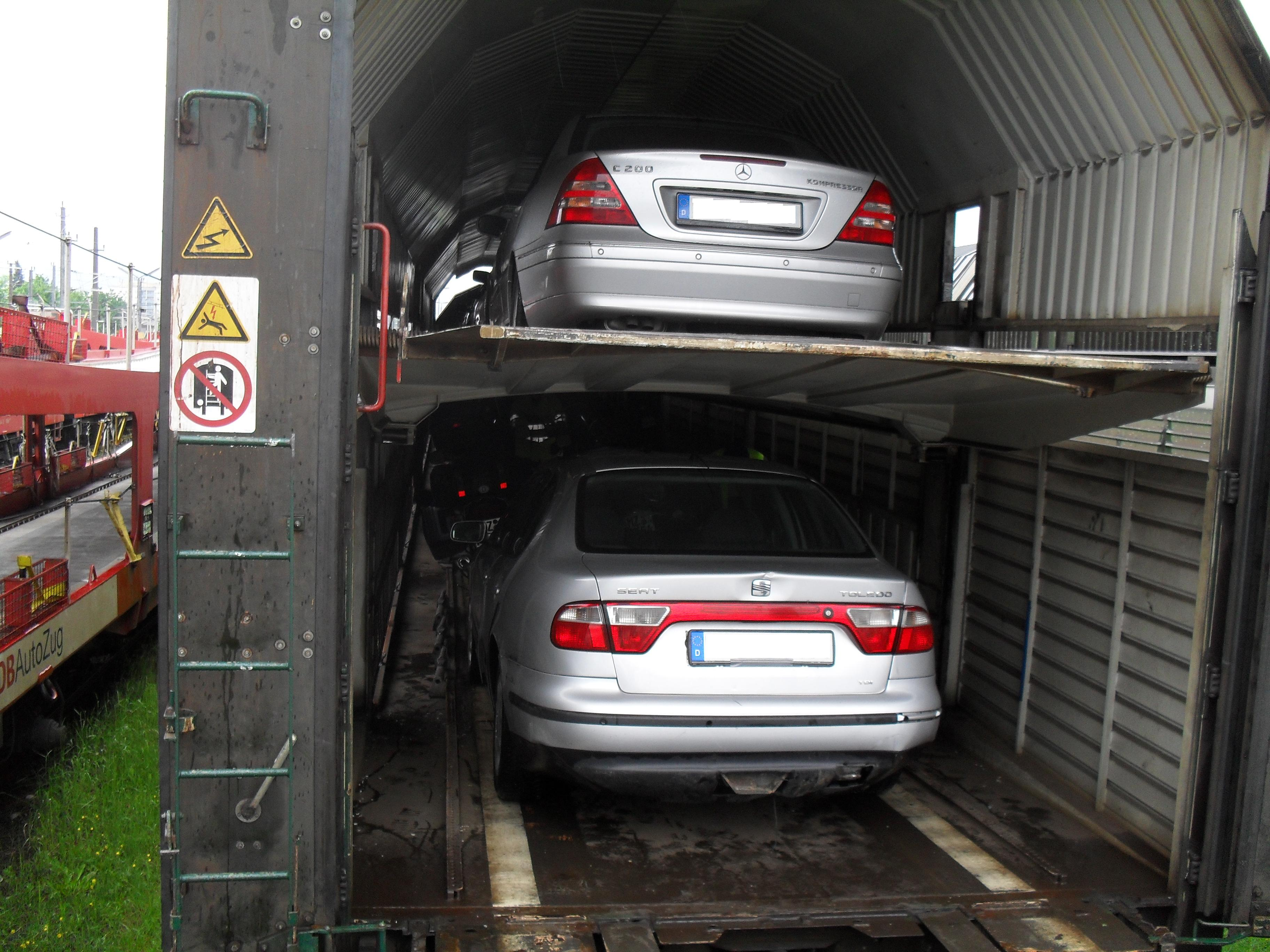
Optima Express, 2010

In Austria, roughly half of the night trains of the Österreichische Bundesbahnen (ÖBB) (called ÖBB nightjet) include car-carrier wagons. Most of the car-carrier wagons are running on a daily basis all-year-round to car terminals located in Austria (Vienna, Graz, Villach, Feldkirch, Innsbruck) and Germany (Hamburg, Düsseldorf). In addition, ÖBB nightjets from Vienna are serving one car terminal in Italy (Livorno) during the summer season. For the motorail services from Austria to Germany, ÖBB took over operations from DB AutoZug, a German motorail company which ceased operations.

Also seasonal is the Optima Express, a three-season service (spring, summer, autumn) between Villach in Austria and Edirne in Turkey with up to four trains each week in summer.

==== Germany ====
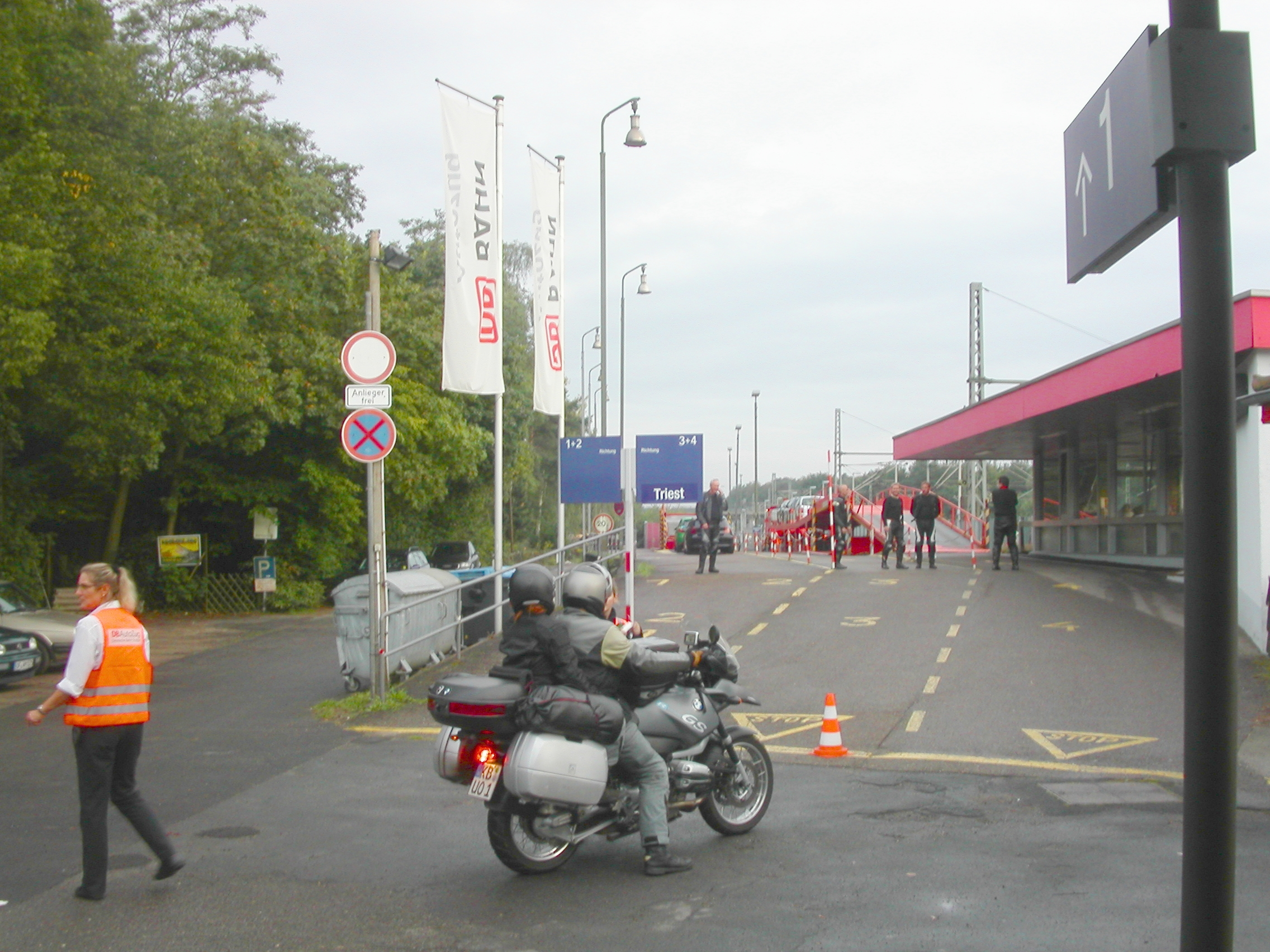
Motorail, railway station Neu-Isenburg, Germany, 2011

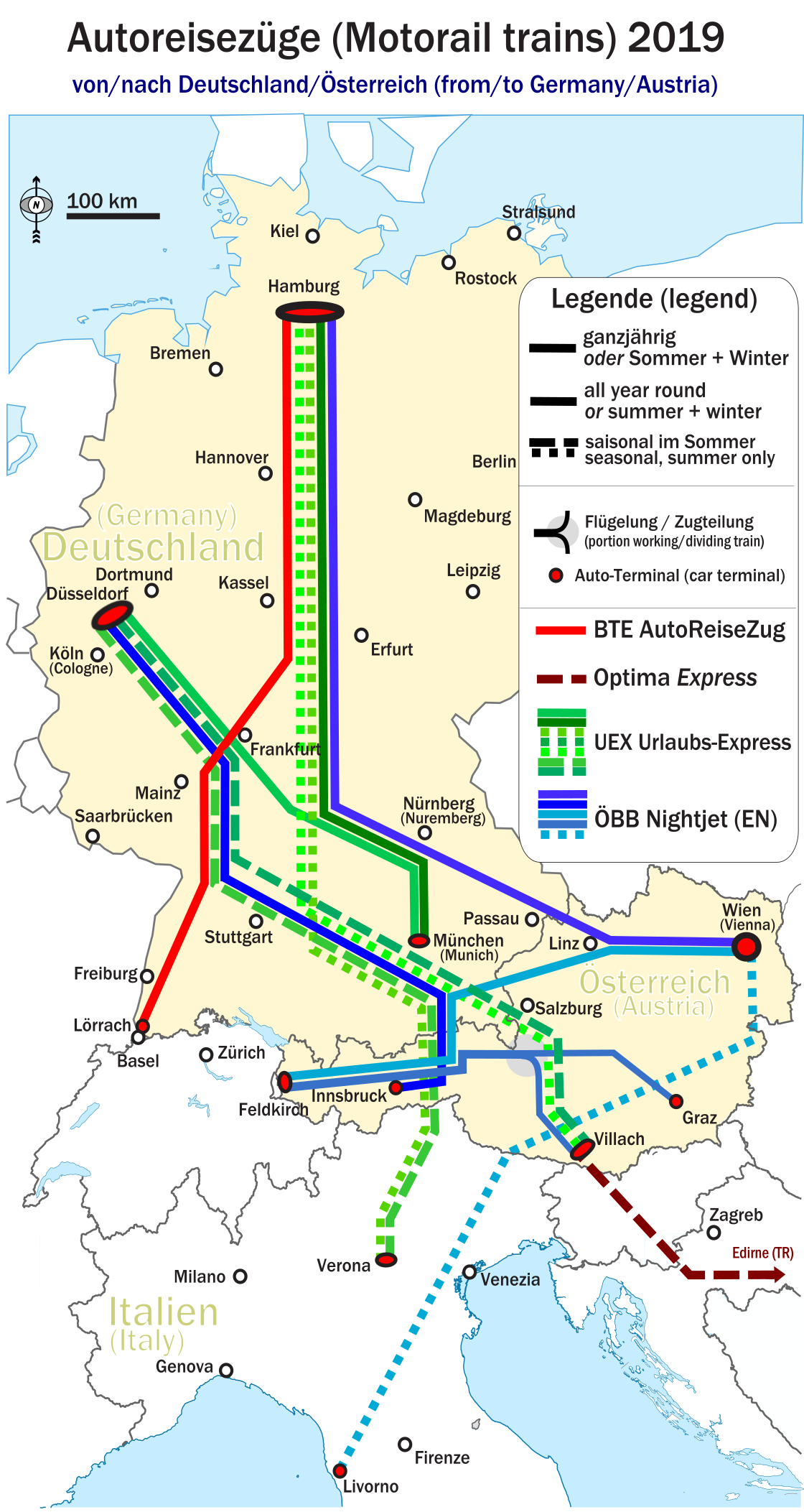
Motorail train lines between Germany, Austria, Italy and Turkey (2018–2019)

In Germany, DB AutoZug offered motorail services for more than 70 years. DB AutoZug ceased to operate in October 2016 as these trains were not considered to be profitable.

Four new motorail operators stepped in during 2015 and 2016, taking over the now abandoned motorail services claiming a sufficient market for motorail services in Germany and Central Europe. One of them (Euro-Express) left the market in late 2017, leaving three motorail operators in the German market: ÖBB, BTE and train4you.

Austrian railway (ÖBB) took over most motorail services from DB Autozug. ÖBB now (as of December 2018) offers daily or almost daily motorail connections (under the brand name ÖBB nightjet) running from Germany to Austria. There are daily EuroNight overnight motorail trains from Vienna to Hamburg. In addition, similar services are offered from Düsseldorf to Innsbruck since December 2016.

Another motorail service abandoned by DB Autozug was taken over by BTE, a German rail tourism company, which is affiliated with the US-based Railroad Development Corporation (RDC). BTE took over the DB Autozug connection between Hamburg and Lörrach, offering all-year-round motorail services 1-4 times a week.

The German company train4you offers under the brand name Urlaubs-Express (UEX) seasonal motorail trains between Hamburg and Düsseldorf and Munich, Verona and Villach. Most trans run exclusively during the summer apart from service to and from Munich, which are bi-seasonal, running both in the summer and winter.

==== Italy ====
In Italy, Trenitalia operated national Motorail services, advertised as "Auto e moto al seguito". As of 12 December 2011, all of these services have been withdrawn. After the withdrawal of motorail services by state-owned Trenitalia the private railway company Arenaways started overnight motorail trains running from Turin in the north of Italy to Reggio Calabria and Bari in the south. Talgo train coaches from RENFE group in Spain were used for the services. After the bankruptcy of Arenaways in 2014 due to massively manipulated rules by state-owned Trenitalia to exclude the competitor from the market, all services were withdrawn.

In 2019, there are seasonal international motorail trains, operating during the summer months only. German operator train4you operates motorail trains from Düsseldorf and Hamburg to Verona, while state-owned Austrian railway ÖBB connects Livorno with the Austrian capital of Vienna. The services are reduced in comparison to 2017 and 2018 which saw motorail trains operating from Hamburg, Düsseldorf and Vienna to Verona and Livorno.

==== Netherlands ====
There were motorail services, called AutoSlaapTrein, which ran in the summer months from 's-Hertogenbosch (Den Bosch) in the Netherlands to Koper in Slovenia, to Alessandria and Livorno in Italy, and Frejus and Avignon in the South of France. EETC (Euro-Express trein charter), the owner of the AutoSlaapTrein, suspended their services in April 2015. Another Dutch company, the travel agency Treinreiswinkel, continued the Autoslaaptrein in May 2015 with a connection between Germany (Düsseldorf) and Verona. All these motorail trains were operated by Müller-Touristik-Group in Germany under the brand name Euro-Express. In 2018, the Euro-Express trains were canceled.

==== Turkey ====
The only motorail train of Turkey is running between Villach/Austria and Edirne/Turkey mainly for the Turkish workers abroad, passing through Austria, Slovenia, Croatia, Serbia and Bulgaria. The whole journey completes 1400 km in 30 hours. The train is operated by Optima Tours.

==== Czech Republic and Slovakia ====
Currently, there is a daily all-year-round service between Prague and Košice, EN Slovakia, which also carries a motorail car between Prague and Poprad (for High Tatras). There is a seasonal service between Prague and Split (fasttrain Jadran) which took 24 hours, in seasons 2003–2005 weekly, in seasons 2007–2009 daily. This was running also in summer 2023.

Domestic motorail service between Bratislava and Humenné is also available in Slovakia.

Trains are jointly operated by České dráhy and Železničná spoločnosť Slovensko.

==== Finland ====
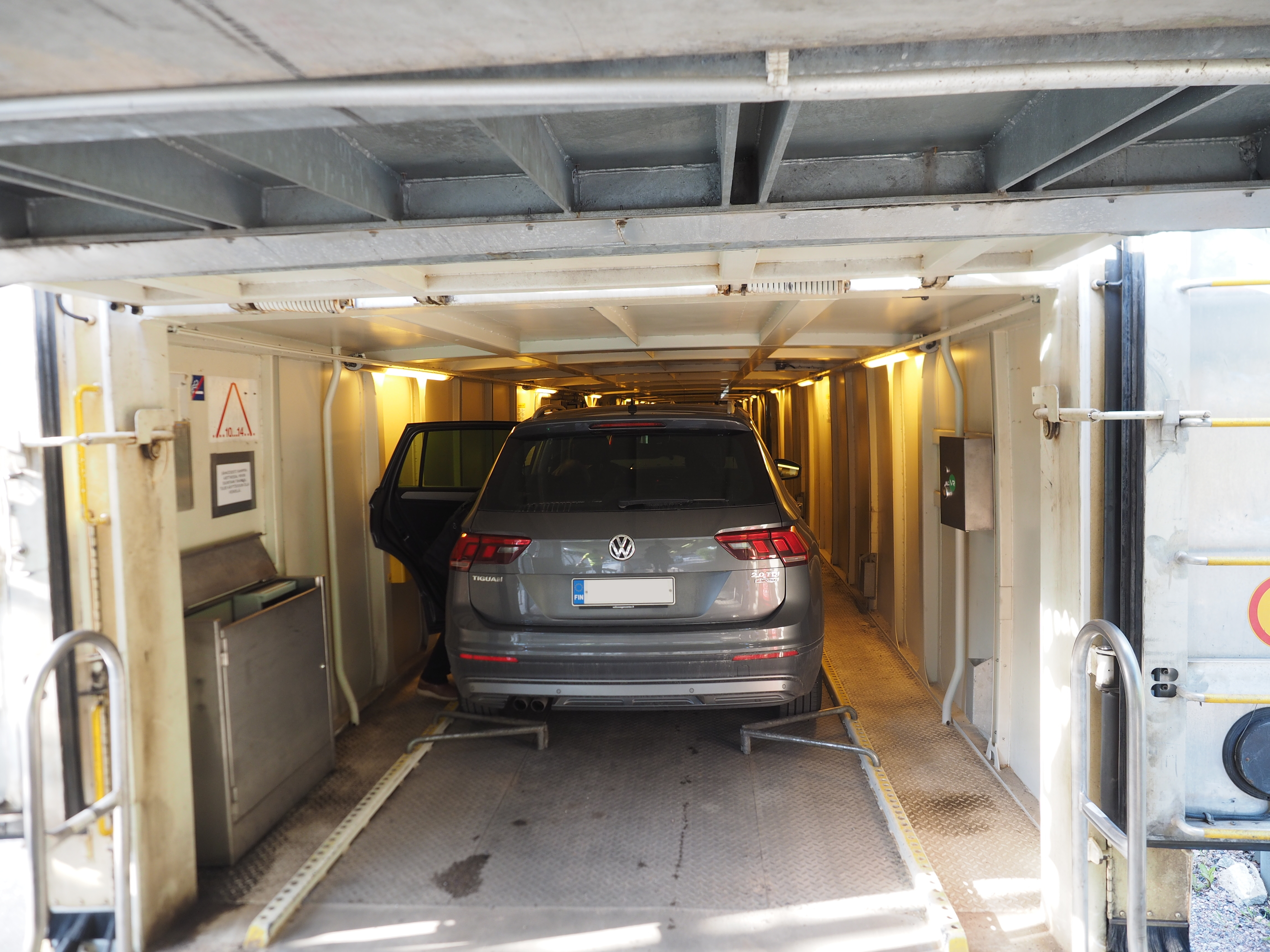
A car loaded into a carriage on a train from Helsinki to Kolari. Drivers drive their own cars onto the train as instructed by VR, and then leave the car transport carriages on foot to board the passenger carriages.

In Finland, VR has a popular automobile-carrying service on its night trains between the south and the north; the service transports 35,000 automobiles a year. The service operates with trains originating from both Helsinki and Turku first stopping at Tampere; from there they follow the same line to the next stop in Oulu. Thereafter, the line splits with one line going up to Kolari and another line making stops at Rovaniemi and Kemijärvi. These trains also include sleeper cars allowing passengers to sleep well before driving the next morning.

==== France ====
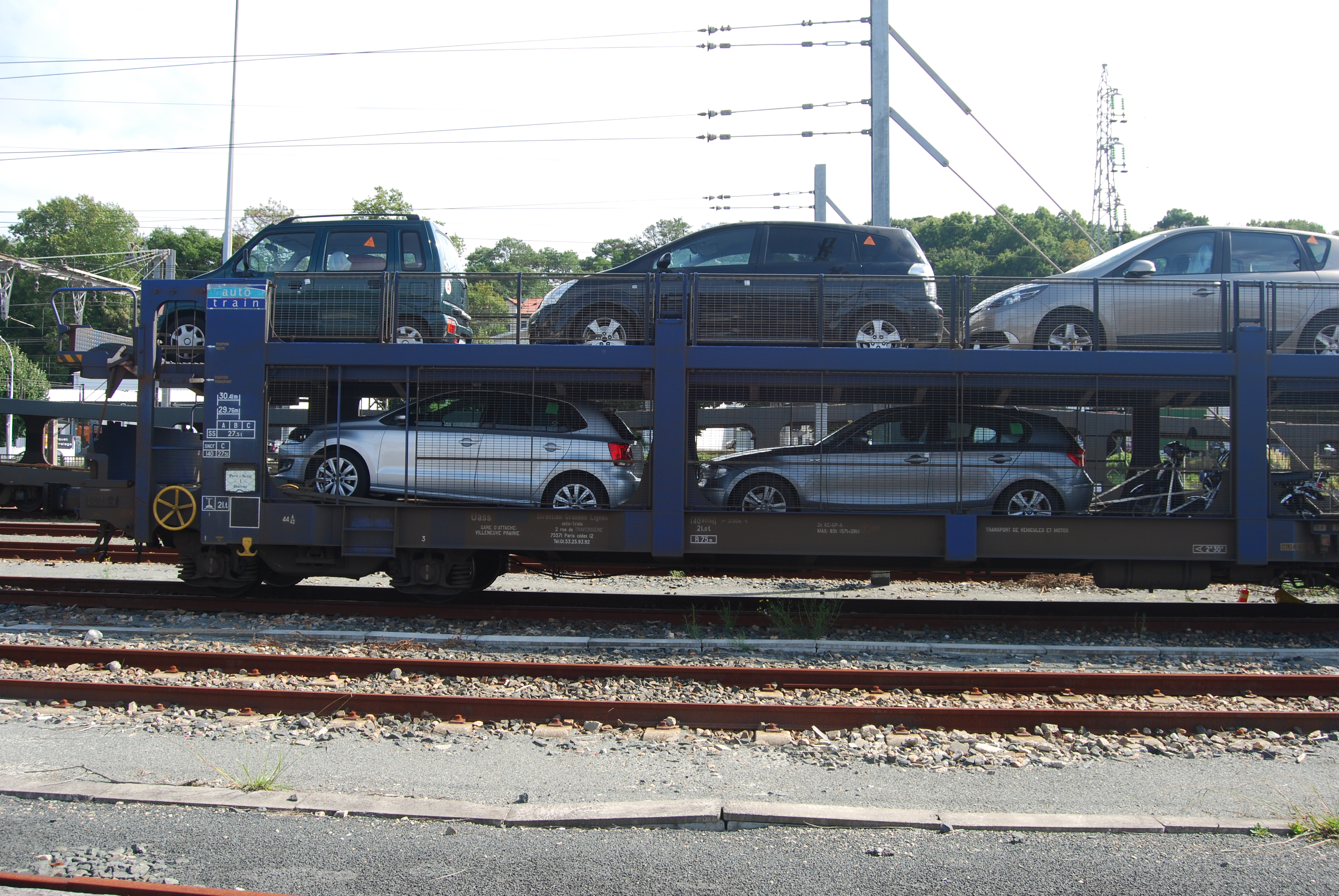
Auto-train, Biarritz, 2014

In France, the SNCF's Auto/train service comprised several overnight automobile-carrying trains throughout France. In the past, all of the Auto/trains also carried sleeping cars. Later on, passengers traveled on a separate train to their automobiles. Typically, passengers dropped off their car any time during the day and then used a separate train to reach their destination, where they could pick up the car any time the following day.

The service was available between 13 railway stations, with Gare de Bercy in Paris being the main Auto/train terminal. There were also terminals available in the stations of Biarritz, Bordeaux, Briançon, Brive, Lyon-Perrache, Marseille-Saint-Charles, Nice, Toulon, and Toulouse. Avignon, Fréjus-St-Raphaël and Narbonne also had the service available via stations separate from their passenger terminals. The automobiles were carried in open railcars. Other services offered through the Auto/train service were a valet to collect cars at passengers' homes, complementary insurance, a free bus to leave the arrival station (available for example at Bercy, Avignon, and Fréjus) and free parking.

The service was discontinued in December 2019.

==== Poland ====
In the early 1980s PKP offered motorail services between the following stations: Szczecin Dąbie, Trzebiatów, Gdynia Główna, Warszawa Główna, Poznań Główny, Katowice, Kraków Główny, and Zakopane. Services ran overnight and passengers were carried in sleeping cars and couchettes.

By the end of the 1990s PKP operated only a single motorail service on overnight trains between Gdynia and Zakopane. The service never gained essential popularity and ultimately was withdrawn in 2004. Among many factors which led to closure of this service, it was criticised for being too cumbersome: while in Zakopane the passengers' cars were available almost immediately, it took nearly two hours to load or unload cars in Gdynia.

==== Serbia ====
There is a Motorail service in Serbia along the following routes: Belgrade - Bar (throughout the year), Novi Sad - Bar (summer season only) and Belgrade - Thessaloniki (summer season only).

==== Switzerland ====
In Switzerland, several car shuttle trains run, called Autoverlad; no motorail services exist.

==== United Kingdom ====
British Rail operated Motorail services from 1955 serving various destinations, but had discontinued them by the time the state-owned body was wound up in the mid-1990s. The privatised train operator First Great Western went on to revive the service between London and Penzance in 1998, operating it until September 2005.

=== Asia-Pacific ===
==== Australia ====
Journey Beyond provides a Motorail service on its long-distance Indian Pacific between Adelaide and Perth, and The Ghan between Adelaide and Darwin.

It formerly offered Motorail on The Overland services.

Traveltrain in Queensland formerly offered a Motorail service on its Sunlander and Spirit of the Outback trains.

The Victorian Railways formerly offered Motorail on The Vinelander, and Sunraysia services on the Mildura line. The New South Wales Railways (later the Public Transport Commission) once offered Motorail services on its long-distance lines.

==== Japan ====
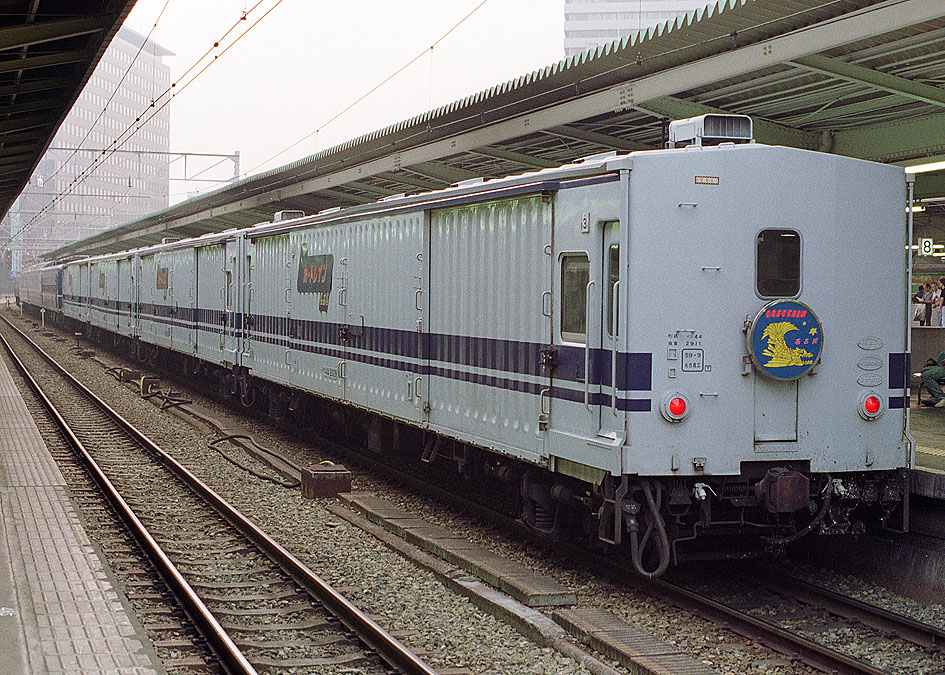
A Japanese "car train" in Nagoya in 1988

Several overnight "car train" (カートレイン) services were operated by the Japanese National Railways and its successor JR Group between 1985 and 1999. The first such service operated between Shiodome Freight Terminal in Tokyo and Higashi-Kokura Freight Terminal in northern Kyushu. At various times during the 1990s, similar services were operated between Nagoya and Kyushu, between Tokyo and Hokkaido through the Seikan Tunnel, and within Hokkaido.

The freight terminal at Ebisu Station was used as a terminal for car train services prior to its closure for redevelopment as the Ebisu Garden Place complex, at which point such services were moved to Hamamatsucho Station.

There were a number of problems with these services which contributed to their eventual cancellation, including fairly severe size restrictions on the vehicles that could be transported, lack of on-board dining facilities, revenue sharing issues between regional operating companies following the privatization of JR, and competition with both long-distance car ferries and combination air/rental car travel products.

=== America ===
==== Canada ====
The Ontario Northland Railway's Auto Carrier Service has several chain cars that carry vehicles from Cochrane to Moosonee. The train used is referred to as the Polar Bear Express. The train typically carries 15 vehicles. It also allows palletized freight, personal effects, household goods, groceries, building material, and special vehicles (ATVs, UTVs, snowmobiles, boats, and canoes). Spaces are also available for small enclosed trailers, boat and snowmobile trailers. These may be brought on either boxcars or flatcars. 3000 cars are transported yearly, with regular motorail service several times a week. Larger trucks (1 ton and higher) may be brought on the train but through a different service. The Polar Bear Express is a popular service for those living in communities near the James Bay as no all season road exists to link Moosonee with the rest of Ontario. The train is also frequented by hunters travelling up North.

CN Rail operated the Car-Go Rail and Auto-With-You motorail services around the 1960s, but closed the service a few years after due to low popularity.

==== Chile ====
In Chile, EFE (Empresa de los Ferrocarriles del Estado) operated a service called "Autotren" between Santiago and Temuco. It has, alongside most rail services in the country, been discontinued.

==== United States ====
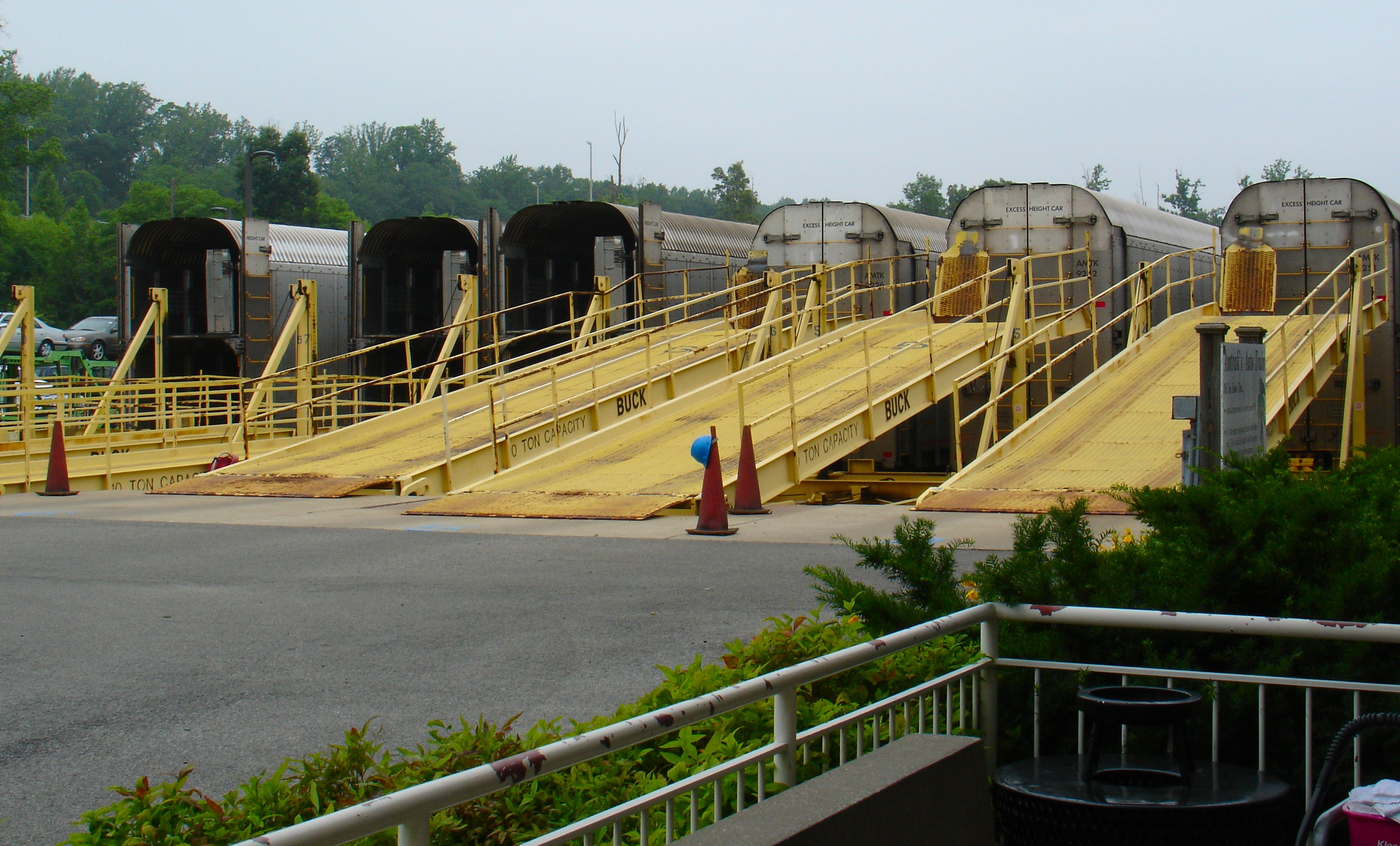
Ramps for loading the Auto Train

Amtrak operates their dedicated Auto Train between Lorton, Virginia (near Washington, D.C.) and Sanford, Florida (near Orlando), a distance of 855 miles (1,376 km). The train can carry upwards of 330 vehicles inside fully enclosed bilevel autoracks, allowing vehicles even as tall as SUVs with rooftop cargo boxes to fit inside. Special vehicles such as small trailers, limousines, jet-skis, trikes, and chopper motorcycles may be brought on for an extra fee. The train is commonly used by tourists travelling south for vacation to Florida.

==== Argentina ====
In Argentina, the transportation of cars by train was very popular for many years, but after the privatization of passenger services in the 1990s, most of the rail services were canceled. Currently this service is provided only on the Tren Patagonico (Patagonian Train), which connects Viedma on the Atlantic coast with Bariloche in the Andes covering a distance of 800 km, and on the Buenos Aires-Mar Del Plata line, connecting the capital of the country with the Atlantic coast in a distance of 400 km.

== See also ==
- Car shuttle train
- Eurotunnel Shuttle
- Modalohr
- Rolling highway
- Transporter wagon
