= Pursuit Special =

Fictional automobile in the Mad Max franchise

- Mad Max vehicle
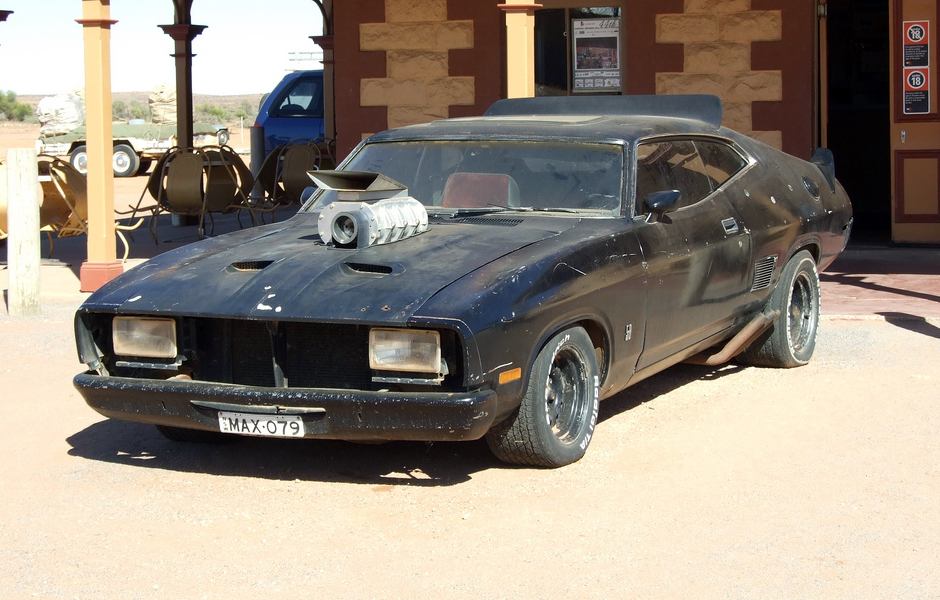
- Replica with air dam and headlight covers
- First appearance: Mad Max (1979)

Information
- Affiliation: Main Force Patrol; Max Rockatansky

General characteristics
- Class: V8 Interceptor; Coupe; Muscle car
- Propulsion: Internal combustion engine Front-engine, rear-wheel-drive

The Pursuit Special (Note: also called the Last of the V8 Interceptors, Last of the V8s, and Interceptor) is a fictional muscle car, a Ford Falcon (XB) in the Mad Max franchise, driven by the titular character. It appears in Mad Max, Mad Max 2, Mad Max: Fury Road, and Furiosa: A Mad Max Saga, the comic book prequel, as well as both video games.

== Mad Max ==
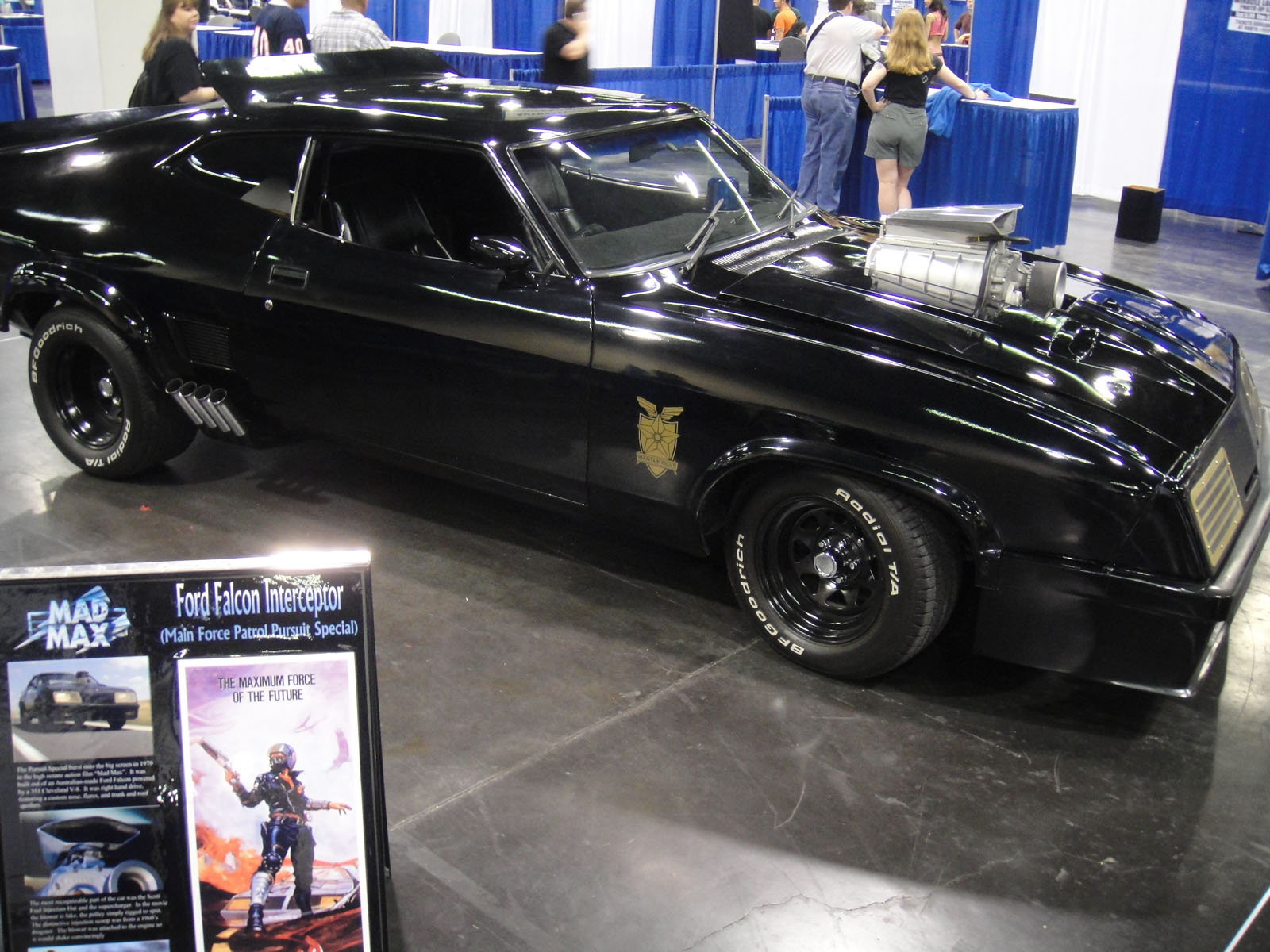
The Pursuit Special MFP Interceptor as it appeared in Mad Max

The first vehicle called the Pursuit Special shown in the film is a 1972 Holden Monaro (HQ) V8 coupe, stolen by Nightrider (played by Vince Gil), an escaped cop killer, who dies in an accident during a chase with the Main Force Patrol (MFP) that destroys the vehicle. Max Rockatansky (played by Mel Gibson) is offered a new Pursuit Special, a modified 1973 Ford Falcon (XB) GT Hardtop as an incentive to stay on the force as their top pursuit man after he reveals his desire to resign. Although Max turns the offer down, he later uses the new vehicle to exact his revenge on an outlaw motorcycle gang who killed his wife and son.

=== Origins ===
It started out as a white 1973 Ford Falcon (XB) GT Hardtop with a 351 cu in (5.8 L) V8. In 1976, filmmakers Byron Kennedy and George Miller began preproduction on Mad Max. The film's art director Jon Dowding designed the Pursuit Special and commissioned Melbourne-based car customiser Graf-X International to modify the Falcon. Peter Arcadipane, Ray Beckerley, John Evans, and painter Rod Smythe transformed the car as specified for the film.

=== Modifications ===
It was painted in black, given roof and boot spoilers, wheel arch flares, front nose cone and air-dam. Eight individual side exhaust pipes were added, with only two being functional. It had a non-functional Weiand 6-71 supercharger protruding through the bonnet, in the first two Mad Max films the supercharger is switched on and off, which is impossible for a real supercharger to do.

=== Promotional use ===
At the completion of filming, the producers could not pay all the creditors, so the black Interceptor was given to mechanic Murray Smith. The blower and side pipes were removed to make it suitable for use as a road vehicle. Murray then toured it around locally to try and sell it. Warner Bros contacted Murray to acquire the car as they were now making Mad Max 2, with Murray selling it to them.

== Mad Max 2 (The Road Warrior) ==
In the meantime, the low-budget Australian film had gained worldwide success, prompting a sequel, Mad Max 2. For the film, the Pursuit Special was reacquired by Kennedy and Miller.

=== New modifications ===
The rear wheels and side pipes were changed. The original supercharger that was removed (then subsequently lost) was replaced. Unlike in the first film, this time the supercharger was functional and the effect of the blower being engaged or disengaged was created by placing the vehicle on a low loader, and while in motion, the engine was started or stopped. The car was cosmetically modified for the new post-apocalyptic setting with the addition of a pair of large cylindrical fuel tanks fitted in the rear and its general appearance was given a more weathered look by painting the vehicle in matte rather than gloss black, and the paint was scrubbed off to appear rusty. The front end was also modified by removing the air dam. A duplicate car was also made for the film. When the script required it to be destroyed by rolling down an embankment and eventually exploding, the duplicate interceptor was used, leaving the original vehicle intact.

=== Disposal and restoration ===
When production was completed, the intact Pursuit Special was sold to a wrecking yard in Broken Hill, along with other wrecks from the film. The GT Falcon was then onsold to another wrecker Hilliers Auto Salvage in South Australia and in the mid-1980s, the car was rescued by Bob Fursenko, who restored the interceptor by having a new nose cone and air dam fitted, but retaining the fuel tanks from Mad Max 2. Fursenko confirmed the vehicle's authenticity with Kennedy Miller. It was subsequently shown widely in Australia before being sold by Fursenko and shipped to the Cars of the Stars Motor Museum in England, where it stayed until its closure in 2011. It was then relocated to the Dezer Car Museum in Miami, Florida.

== Mad Max: Fury Road ==
While the Pursuit Special was absent in Mad Max Beyond Thunderdome, the vehicle returned for the fourth film in the franchise, Mad Max: Fury Road. Miller stated that "all the vehicles are kind of hybrid, cobbled together, from the wrecks of the past". The vehicle only features briefly in the film; it is captured along with Max in the opening sequence, and is shown being repaired by a group of Immortan Joe's followers. It returns in the final battle, driven by one of the War Boys, only to be crushed between the War Rig and the fuel transporter, the People Eater. When asked in an interview with The Hollywood Reporter whether Fury Road is a reboot or sequel, George Miller implied that it may not be, saying that "the films are loosely connected". However, the comic book prequel to the film, for which Miller received a story credit, places it after Mad Max Beyond Thunderdome. The comic also shows how he got the motor for the salvage car and ends with Max driving it for the first time.

== Furiosa: A Mad Max Saga ==
The Pursuit Special appears briefly in the prequel film Furiosa: A Mad Max Saga, as Max Rockatansky watches Furiosa return to the Citadel.

== Story ==
In the movies, Pursuit Specials are undercover police cruisers, which also serve as interceptors. At the opening of the first film in the series, the only Pursuit Special is a 1972 Holden Monaro, which is rusty and used. It is stolen by the Nightrider, a member of a motorcycle gang called the Zed Runners (also known as the Acolytes), and is wrecked while escaping police custody.

Pursuit Special, when the term is used, generally refers to Max's more famous V8 Interceptor Pursuit Special, Ford Falcon (XB) GT 351 coupe, commissioned at great expense by Police Commissioner Labatouche and the Main Force Patrol's commander, Fifi Macaffee. Assembled by the MFP's mechanic, Barry, it features port exhaust pipes and a Weiand "blower" supercharger (nonfunctional film prop). When Max's family is murdered by the gang, he steals the Pursuit Special from the MFP garage and goes on a vengeful rampage.

In Mad Max 2, set roughly five years after the events of the previous film, the Pursuit Special has suffered from the effects of the desert: it loses the front end early in the first chase sequence of the film (as Max forcefully rear-ends a raider vehicle), the car is rusty, and the tyres appear to be in a poor state. The car itself has been modified, presumably by Max: the rear window and the boot lid have been removed to make room for two huge fuel tanks. (With a capacity of over 150 L (40 US gal) of petrol, these would have significantly improved the vehicle's range.) The car only appears at the beginning of the film, where Max escapes a group of raiders, then rescues a mortally wounded member of an oil rig settlement; and then again later, when it is destroyed during Max's failed attempt to escape the settlement.

The Pursuit Special returns in Mad Max: Fury Road. The film never explains its reappearance; however, the Fury Road comic series, set just before the film, includes a story arc where Max gathers parts to rebuild the vehicle before the events of Fury Road. The car is shown very briefly in the film, having been driven by Max before it is destroyed by Immortan Joe's men. It is then repaired by Joe's War Boys, taken back to bare metal, giving it a silver appearance. It is then redubbed the "Razor Cola" and used as one of their vehicles. It is destroyed by being crushed between two larger trucks.

=== Mad Max (2015 video game) ===
In the 2015 video game, Immortan Joe's son, Scabrous Scrotus, is a warlord of Gastown (the settlement referred to in Fury Road). His men steal the Pursuit Special (referred to as the "Black-on-Black" in the game by Chumbucket) from Max at the start of the game and dismantle it. Max spends time with Chumbucket, an expert mechanic, building a replacement throughout the game known as "the Magnum Opus", so he may cross the Plains of Silence, a barren stretch of salt flats that Max believes will relieve him of his nightmarish memories. In the final battle of the game, the Opus, now on par with the Interceptor, is destroyed along with both Scrotus' Land Mover, and the designer/caretaker of the Opus, Chumbucket. Max thinks he is now without a car, only to have Scrotus emerge with Max's Interceptor. After dispatching the warlord, Max reclaims his car, returns the picture of his family to the dashboard, and drives off into the wasteland.

== See also ==
- List of fictional cars
