= Reluctant hero =

Fictional character archetype

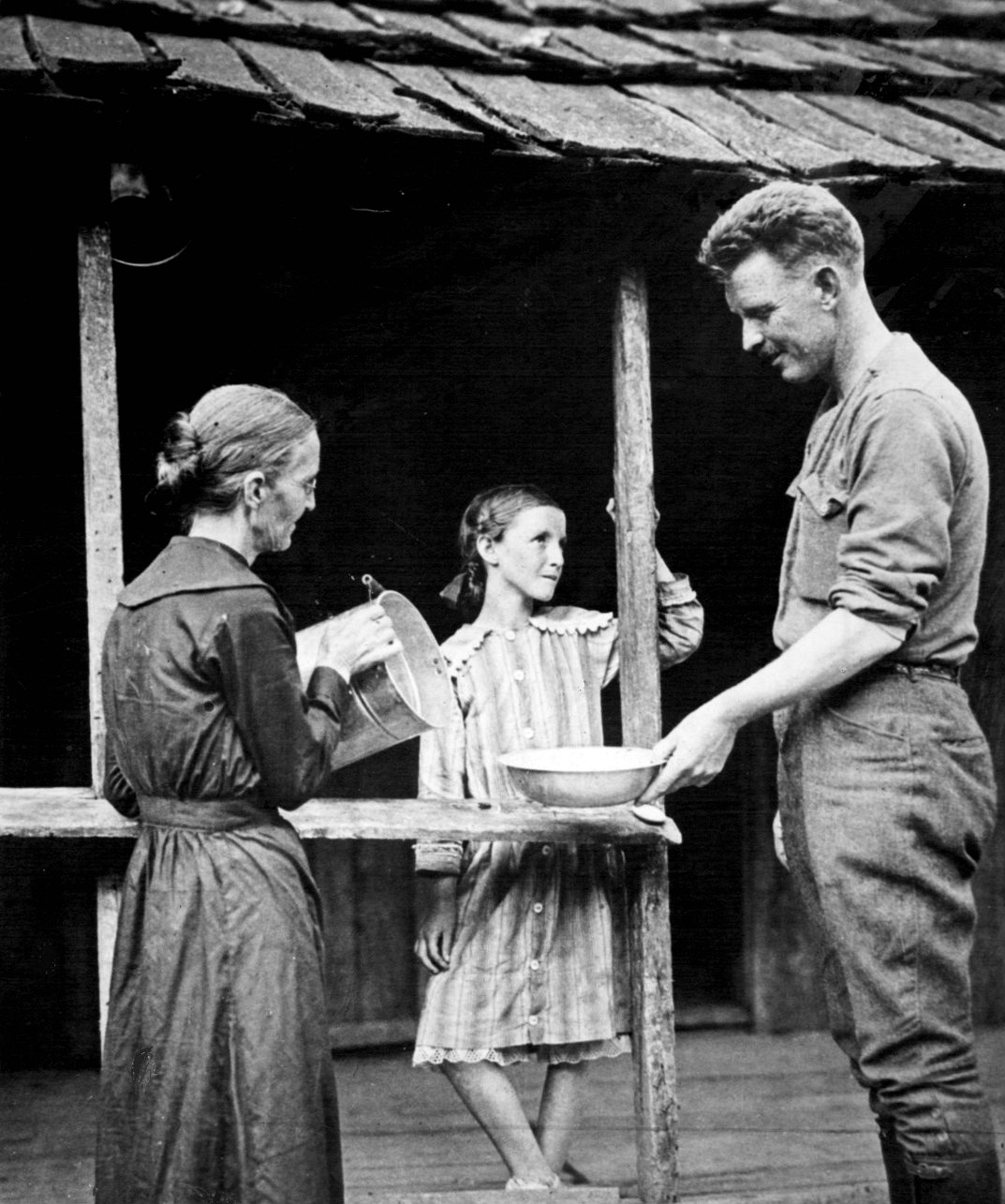
Sgt. Alvin York returning home to family in 1919, after famous adventures in World War I, despite being a drafted conscientious objector.

The reluctant hero is a heroic archetype typically found in fiction. The reluctant hero is typically portrayed either as an everyman forced into surreal situations which require him to rise to heroism and its acts, or as a person with special abilities who nonetheless reveals a desire to avoid using those abilities for selfless benefit. In either case, the reluctant hero does not initially seek adventure or the opportunity to do good, and their apparent selfishness may induct them into the category of antiheroes. The reluctant hero differs from the antihero in that the story arc of the former inevitably results in their becoming a true hero.

In many stories, the reluctant hero is portrayed as having a period of doubt after their initial venture into heroism. This may arise from the negative consequences of their own heroic actions, or by the achievement of some position of personal safety – leaving the audience to wonder whether the reluctant hero will return to heroism at the moment when they are needed the most (typically the climax). In real life, there are cases in history and popular culture where people have been perceived as reluctant heroes.

One of the earliest occurrences of this archetype may be the biblical prophet Jonah, who refused to be elected, fled God's injunction to take on his responsibility as a prophet, only accepting it after his tribulation in the belly of the whale.

== Quotes ==
A summary of the archetype:

"A reluctant hero is a tarnished or ordinary man with several faults or a troubled past, and he is pulled reluctantly into the story, or into heroic acts. During the story, he rises to the occasion, sometimes even vanquishing a mighty foe, sometimes avenging a wrong. But he questions whether he's cut out for the hero business. His doubts, misgivings, and mistakes add a satisfying layer of tension to a story".

Another commentator notes, with respect to game design:

The wonderful aspect of a reluctant hero is that he or she doesn't have to adhere to any stereotype, such as being incredibly strong or a trained kung-fu master. These can be average guys off the street; indeed, it's often their simple, homespun down-to-earth thinking that saves the day. This ordinariness is an important factor in allowing the audience to understand and bond with the hero.

== Examples ==
=== In fiction ===
- In the movie Die Hard, Officer John McClane of the NYPD became a reluctant hero, when on Christmas Eve, West German terrorist Hans Gruber took over the Nakatomi Plaza, Los Angeles in an attempt to steal millions of bearer bonds. McClane, who was at Nakatomi Plaza, where his wife, Holly Gennaro was an employee, for the Christmas Party, was able to remain hidden from the group of terrorists, and was able to cause chaos, eventually spoiling Gruber's Christmas celebrations. Sgt. Al Powell of the LAPD who did not like using a gun after accidentally killing a young boy at a crime scene, also becomes a reluctant hero when he shoots, and kills, the enraged terrorist known only as 'Karl'.
- Robert A. Segal characterizes Arjuna from the Hindu epic The Mahabharata as a reluctant hero. Arjuna casts aside his weapons, fearful at the prospect of killing his kinsman during a civil war. Krishna then relates to Arjuna a series of arguments that convince Arjuna to go to war nonetheless.
- In Star Wars, Han Solo is portrayed as a reluctant hero. He is hesitant to join the Alliance to Restore the Republic due to being an outlaw. In the Expanded Universe novel Balance Point his son Jacen fits the characteristics of reluctant hero. He is unwilling to fight out of fear that the galaxy will tumble into darkness. In the end, he saves his mother's life and wounds the Yuuzhan Vong Warmaster Tsavong Lah.
- In Captain Toad: Treasure Tracker, after Captain Toad and Toadette found a star, Wingo steals it and captures Toadette, forcing Captain Toad to rescue her.
- Spider-Man also fits the criteria of the reluctant hero as throughout his career, Peter Parker constantly questions his decision to become a superhero. One of the most famous examples would be The Amazing Spider-Man issue 50, titled Spider-Man No More!.
- Eddie Valiant from Who Framed Roger Rabbit fits into this category, being forced out of a depressive funk in order to solve a murder and prove the innocence of Roger Rabbit.
- Captain Mainwaring, of Dad's Army, shows traits of a reluctant hero as he casts aside his self-important personality to protect his platoon and country.
- Max Rockatansky is captured and unwillingly brought into the main conflict of Mad Max: Fury Road, after agreeing to help Imperator Furiosa and Immortan Joe's "wives" escape in order to save himself.
- Aang from Avatar: The Last Airbender is the current incarnation of the Avatar who controls four elements to maintain peace. Although he's an easygoing pacifist who wishes to live a peaceful life, his desire to protect people and stop violence leads him to fight to end a war which has gone on for 100 years.
- The Doctor from Doctor Who played the reluctant hero, preferring to solve things with peace instead of war. This was shown during his third, fourth, fifth, eighth, tenth, eleventh, and thirteenth incarnations.
- Nathan Lind from Godzilla vs. Kong, is a geologist and cartographer who helps Kong.
- Oliver Cromwell from Cromwell (1970) and Rodrigo from El Cid (1961) are both historical figures who are presented as reluctant heroes, chosen by others to fight for a noble cause. Both are pulled away from their families and their homes where they would prefer to remain, and reluctantly sacrifice their normal lives for the causes they have committed to.
- Gohan from Dragon Ball Z is the son of main protagonist Goku who undergoes a transformation from a reluctant hero to a full grown hero during the Cell Games saga in the series. He started as a fearful boy who feared getting into trouble and even hesitated to act in the heat of the battle during the fights against the Saiyans Nappa and Vegeta, the Ginyu force, the androids and Cell. Only after seeing his friends and loved ones getting hurt as in the case of Goku being hurt by Raditz and Vegeta, Krillin being stabbed by Frieza's horns and the Z-Fighters being hurt by the Cell Juniors was Gohan able to tap into his true hidden power and potential and explode into a furious rage. This was how he's able to overcome being a reluctant hero into a true hero. Perfect Cell crushing Android 16's head is what pushed Gohan over the edge and finally snapped allowing the young boy to tap into the incredible destructive power of the Super Saiyan 2 transformation.

=== In real life ===
- Alvin York, a World War I draftee who was a conscientious objector, but who distinguished himself in battle as a sniper. York's story has been dramatized in several movies that emphasized his reluctant hero status.
- Neil Armstrong has been described as "a reluctant American hero".
