= List of British production designers =

This is a list of British film production designers

== A ==
- Ken Adam

== B ==
- John Barry
- Oliver Bayldon
- John Box

== C ==
- Maurice Carter
- Martin Childs
- Stuart Craig

== D ==
- Carmen Dillon
- Guy Hendrix Dyas

== F ==
- Anton Furst

== G ==
- Assheton Gorton

== H ==
- Tim Harvey

== L ==
- Peter Lamont

== M ==
- Terence Marsh
- Anthony Masters
- Thomas N. Morahan

== P ==
- Anthony Pratt

== R ==
- Norman Reynolds
- Chris Richmond

== S ==
- Elliot Scott

== V ==
- Alex Vetchinsky
