= Mad Max: Fury Road (comic book) =

2015 comic series

- Cover of Mad Max: Fury Road trade paperback

Publication information
- Publisher: Vertigo
- Format: Limited series
- Genre: Post-apocalyptic
- Publication date: 20 May – 5 August 2015
- No. of issues: 4
- Main character(s): Max Rockatansky; Imperator Furiosa; Immortan Joe; Nux

Creative team
- Written by: Nico Lathouris; Mark Sexton; George Miller (story)
- Artists: Mark Sexton; Leandro Fernandez; Riccardo Burchielli; Andrea Mutti; Tristan Jones; Szymon Kudranski; Peter Pound
- Letterer: Clem Robins
- Colorists: Michael Spicer; Lovern Kindzierski
- Editor: Alex Antoine

Mad Max: Fury Road is a 2015 comic book limited series created by George Miller, Nico Lathouris and Mark Sexton. Serving as a prequel to the 2015 film of the same name, in addition to bridging the events of the film with the 1985 film Mad Max Beyond Thunderdome, the series focuses on several characters from the film at various points in their lives before it.

== Publication history ==
The series consists of four issues. Beginning in May 2015, Vertigo published one issue per month, ending in August. A single volume collection of all of the issues was published on 26 August. The reception of the series was mixed. Some considered it unnecessary and poorly executed, and many harshly criticized the issue centered on Imperator Furiosa. The issue focused on Nux and Immortan Joe, and the two issues focused on Max Rockatansky were received more positively.

== Plot ==
=== Nux and Immortan Joe ===
Nux's parents travel to the Citadel where they live on the ground without basic necessities. To support his family, Nux's father takes up a job at the top of the Citadel but eventually dies due to the hazardous conditions. Nux's sick mother soon dies as well and believing his father to be still alive, he tries to reach the top by grabbing onto an elevator used by the guards. Nux desperately tries to hold on and the guards watching him start laughing. As he laughs back in a mocking response, the guards are stunned by his grit and one of them saves him from slipping by pulling him up to the platform. They call him "a hard nut to crack", which leads to him being named "Nux", and he eventually joins the War Boys when he grows up.

The second part focuses on the origins of Joe. After society started collapsing, war veteran Colonel Joe Moore formed a raider gang along with others who had served under him like Major Kalashnikov. During one of his raids, a fat captive reveals the location of a massive fortified aquifer which is heavily defended in exchange for being spared. Joe then tries to gain access by offering several sex slaves to the aquifer's defenders, but is rebuffed, causing him to launch an assault. As the siege drags on, the resources of his gang starts running out, but they figure out a way to climb the aquifer by tying themselves to a monitor lizard and dangling a henchman's finger to motivate it to scale all the way to the top. Although the plan initially backfires, Joe and his men are eventually able to eliminate all of the defenders, leading to him being called "Immortal" by his stunned followers, eventually acquiring the name of "Immortan Joe".

Joe turns the aquifer into the base called "The Citadel" for his army, and his group begins operating the oil refinery and the lead mine they discovered during the siege of the aquifer. The refinery is named as "Gas Town" and is given to the fat captive who later comes to be known as the "People Eater", while mine is named "The Bullet Farm" and is given to Kalashnikov, who comes to be known as the "Bullet Farmer". Over time, Joe has three sons; Scabrous Scrotus, Rictus Erectus, and Corpus Colossus, all of whom were either mentally handicapped or physically deformed, paving the way for his plan to father healthy sons as heirs by using various women as his wives who would be isolated from the harsh elements of the wasteland, thus increasing the chances of his children being born healthy.

=== Furiosa ===
Joe selects the Five Wives, healthy young women who could provide him with a suitable male heir, who he keeps locked in a vault. Joe's physician, the Organic Mechanic, informs him that he has a window of two days to impregnate one wife, Angharad, if he wants a healthy son. Angharad is impregnated by Joe. She attempts to kill the fetus but is stopped by Imperator Furiosa who, as his most trusted warrior, Joe has set to watch over them. Initially, the Wives hate her. The Wives attack Furiosa in turn after she prevents the abortion. Furiosa tells them they should feel grateful to have such luxurious lives. They retort that they are miserable.

Gradually, though, a bond forms between the Wives and Furiosa. One night, Joe expresses interest in taking Fragile's virginity. The Dag, upon hearing this tells him to stay away, as she is the only one who has not been abused by him. Joe rapes and impregnates her. He further limits their freedoms, while making them wear chastity belts. Furiosa is dismissed for failing to keep the wives in line, she decides to make a plan so they can escape. Giddy tells them to leave without her as she is too old. They escape the Citadel.

=== Mad Max ===
This comic takes place after Beyond Thunderdome and before Fury Road. Mad Max travels to Gas Town to battle in Thunderdome, in order to win a V8 engine he can use to build a new V8 Interceptor. The majority of the combatants are killed in combat. Max finally faces off with another survivor, who belongs to a bandit clan called the Buzzards, and manages to win with the help of a flare given to him by an unknown woman. The Buzzards, led by the challenger Max defeated, take revenge. Mad Max is stabbed with a knife by a Buzzard who gives him the choice of taking out the knife out of himself and bleeding to death, or leaving it and eventually dying in the desert sun. Max pulls out the knife and uses the knife to cut his bonds. The woman from the Thunderdome, saying that she owes him, rescues Max, and takes him to the underground city of the Buzzards, who have her daughter Glory. She hopes he can rescue her. After some troubles, Max returns Glory to her mother, then kills the Buzzard who had stabbed him, but both mother and child end up dead. Distraught, Max buries them and leaves the city.

=== The War Rig ===
The Wordburger narrates how the War Rig came to be. Its Tatra T815 truck was stolen by Joe's gang shortly after the fall of civilisation, with its driver being killed. The tanker belonged to Brad who fled the cities along with his family hidden in a compartment until gas ran out. Brad was soon killed by bandits and his family starved to death, with their remains and the tanker being found months later by Joe's gang. The twin engines belonged to the Voeten twins who isolated themselves in the countryside after a refugee from the cities killed their father, but were eventually killed themselves by Joe's gang who took the engines. The Chevrolet Fleetmaster belonged to a mechanic called "The Donk" who agreed to join Joe. His car was blown up during Joe's siege of the aquifer and he grafted its chassis onto The War Rig after being ordered by Joe to build vehicles for him.

The Volkswagen Beetle belonged to two girls Annette Lehmann and Jannie Kwong who died due to radiation. They were found years later along with the car by Joe's gang, who turned it into a gun placement for the War Rig, with the girls' pitch-covered skulls being grafted to it. A girl named Leanne Bart isolated herself along with 532 dolls after the fall but died as water ran out, with Rictus finding them during one of Joe's raids. The doll heads and Bart's skull were later grafted to the War Rig. The Skull Wheels were made from scrap traded up to The Citadel by chained slaves, who were only fed if their work pleased Joe and killed if they failed. The story ends with the Wordburger grimly remarking how lives are endlessly sacrificed to the War Rig.

== Release ==
The comic book series was revealed in February 2015 by Vertigo and Miller was announced to helm the writing team. Beginning 20 May 2015, Vertigo started releasing four comic book prequels, one per month, that detail the backstory for a character in the film. The first comic titled Mad Max: Fury Road – Nux and Immortan Joe #1 was released on 20 May. The second one titled Mad Max: Fury Road – Furiosa #1 was released on 17 June. The third one titled Mad Max: Fury Road – Mad Max #1 was released on 8 July. The final prequel comic titled Mad Max: Fury Road – Mad Max #2 was released on 5 August. A single-volume paperback of the series was released on 26 August, collecting the four issues alongside a bonus short story chronicling the creation of the War Rig.

== Reception ==
The series has received mixed reviews. The issue centered on Imperator Furiosa has been harshly criticized for its depictions of rape and its characterization of female characters. Some critics opined that it negatively affects the film. However, the issue centering on Nux and Immortan Joe and the two issues centering on Max were received more positively. The issue was in the top twenty of the "Apple iBooks US Bestseller List - Comics & Graphic Novels" for three weeks.

Individual monthly sales were as follows:

- Nux & Immortan Joe #1 (May 2015) – 11,569 issues sold, #141 top-selling issue by dollar volume, #162 top-selling issue by number of copies sold
- Furiosa #1 (June 2015) – 20,733 sold, #86 by dollar volume, #115 by number of copies
- Max #1 (July 2015) – 79,955 sold, #9 by dollar volume, #12 by number of copies
- Max #2 (August 2015) – 23,172 sold, #68 by dollar volume, #103 by number of copies
- Collected edition trade paperback (September 2015): 5,387 copies sold, #10 graphic novel by dollar volume, #7 graphic novel by units sold (An additional 536 copies were sold in October 2015)
