= Chris Richmond =

Chris or Christopher Richmond may refer to:

- Chris Richmond (film producer), British film and television production designer
- William Richmond (politician) (Christopher William Richmond, 1821–1895), New Zealand politician
