= Production designer =

Person responsible for the overall look of a filmed event

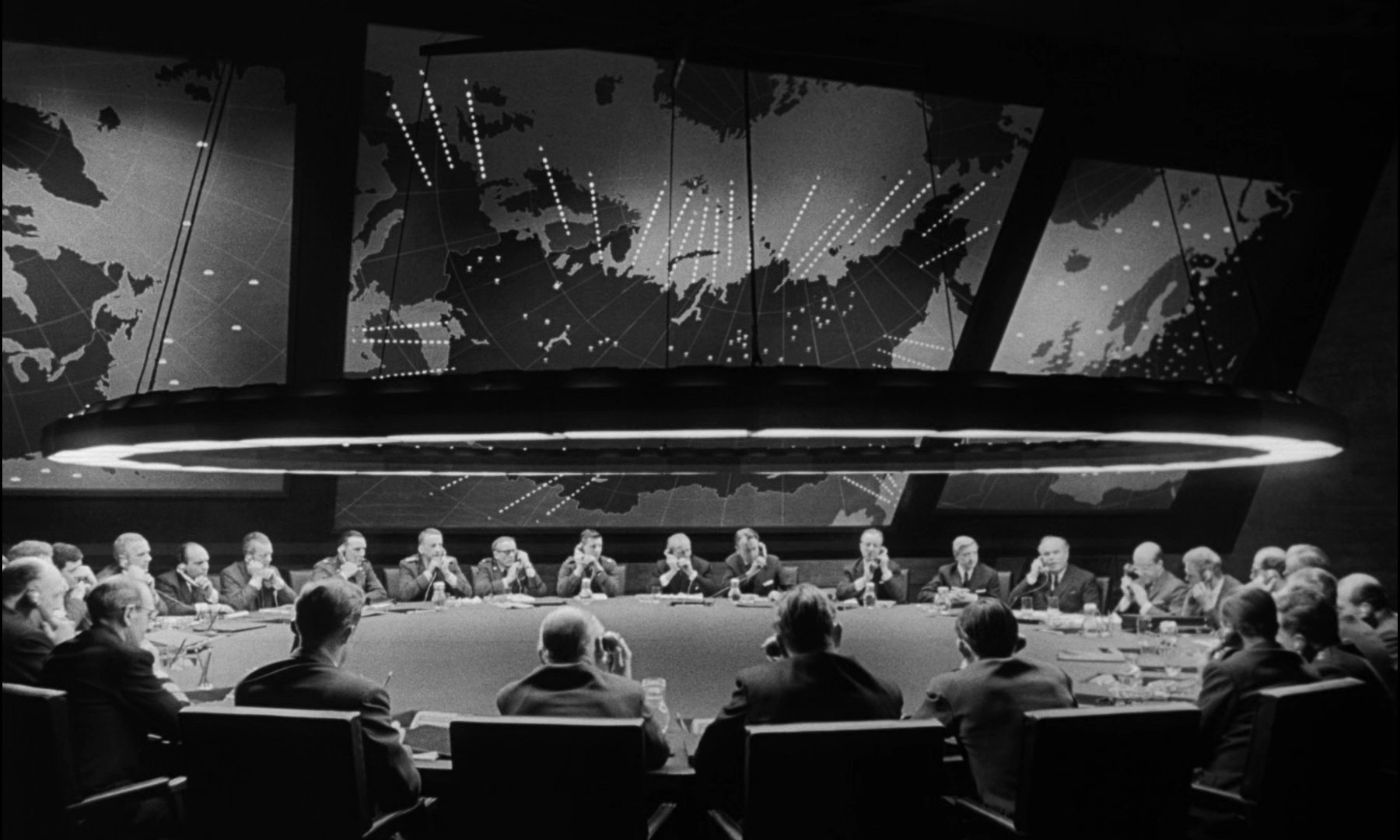
War Room set for Dr. Strangelove (1964), designed by Ken Adam

A production designer is the individual responsible for the overall aesthetic of a film and television story. The production design gives the viewers a sense of the visual media's narrative, tone, setting, time period, the plot location, and character actions and feelings. Working directly with the director, cinematographer, and producer, production designers have a key creative role in the creation of motion pictures and television.

Production designers are commonly confused with art directors, as the roles have similar responsibilities. Production designers decide the visual concept and deal with the many and varied logistics of filmmaking including, schedules, budgets, and staffing. Art directors head an art department, and manage the process of making the visuals, which is done by concept artists, graphic designers, set designers, costume designers, lighting designers, etc. The production designer and the art director lead a team of individuals to assist with the visual component of the film. Depending on the size of the production the rest of the team can include runners, graphic designers, drafts people, props makers, and set builders. Production designers create a framework for the visual aesthetic of a project and work in collaboration with the set decorator to execute the desired look.

== History ==
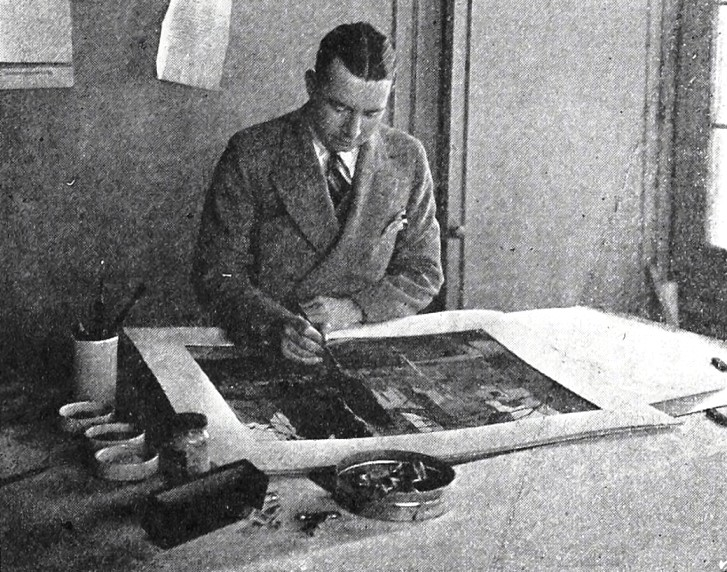
William Cameron Menzies in 1925

The term production designer was coined by David O. Selznick as he went on to describe the significant contributions of William Cameron Menzies while he was working on the film Gone with the Wind. The role went on to become formally established in 1939 with the first Academy Award for Production Design.

Production design's history began with fundamental and simple painting of backdrops in early cinema. Then becoming more sophisticated and advanced with the advent of studio system of the 1920s, which allowed building of elaborate sets. Over time, the role of production designers become more than a limited 'artistic' responsibility to a film set. They became instrumental in encompassing and capturing the entire visual style of the film throughout the run time.

== Process ==
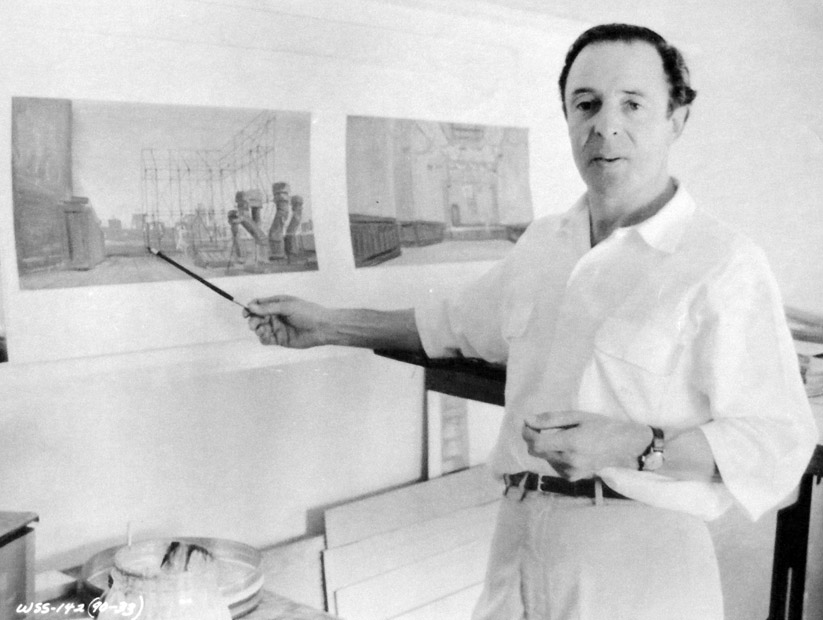
Production designer Boris Leven working on West Side Story (1961)

1. The production designer will read the script and allocate categories based on the required visual components such as interior, exterior, location, graphic, vehicles, etc. Discussion with the director is essential in the beginning of the production design process. In this discussion, the production designer will clarify the approach and focus required for the visual design of each scene.
2. The production designer will move to researching which is important in every design process. They will use mood board which consists of images, sketches, inspiration, color swatches, photos, textiles, etc. that help with the ideation. Learning about the time period, the place and the culture also assists with coming up with an idea. Moreover, the PD has to plan to create a convincing space within a budget, therefore, it is important that the space can speak about the character or enhance the flow of the story, rather than being filled with unnecessary decoration. Additionally, it also affects the location of filming, whether it is in a studio or at a specific location.
3. The production designer will ensure that all the visual components interact and flow cohesively, so that elements like, tone, narration, arcs, and developments are effectively communicated.

== The importance of production design ==
Since production design captures and architects the entire visual aesthetic of a visual media, it holds significant importance in maintaining cohesiveness by conveying the intended narrative, mood, setting and tone with character developments and effective world building.

Production design can be broken down into several core elements -

1. Set design - This is the development of the actual environment where the story is intended to take place. The environment can be emulated in a studio by set-building or be shot on real locations.
2. Props - All the objects that exist in a scene are called props. These objects are meticulously selected or created by designers to aid with the plot, setting, tone or character developments.
3. Costumes and makeup - Characters' visual appearance is crucial to convey specific arcs, social status, journey and tones. With costumes and makeup, an actor's appearance is altered to match with the story's character's identity.
4. Special effects & VFX - Computer generated imageries and technical tools used to enhance visual and strengthen visuals. Some notable examples of movies with critical acclaim to their usage of special effects include - Gravity, Interstellar, The Matrix.
5. Lighting and color - Ensures the lighting and color palettes align with the film's intended mood and visual style. Example - Cold tones to convey isolation and warm tones to convey joy.

With effective communication and planning, production design can be crucial in erecting a visual identity with creative impact even with financially constrained projects.

For example, Mad Max (1979) is widely noted for its low budget, high-impact intricate world building by customizing old cars and sourcing scrap metal and salvaged parts . Parasite (2019), with four Academy Awards, had their large minimal houses built from scratch into a set after extensive 3D mapping and simulations.

Other examples of critically acclaimed production design include Avatar, Avengers, Dune, The Lord of the Rings trilogy, Titanic, Mad Max: Fury Road, Interstellar, and Black Panther.

== Societies and trade organizations ==
In the United States and British Columbia, production designers are represented by several local unions of the International Alliance of Theatrical Stage Employees (IATSE). Local 800, the Art Directors Guild, represents production designers in the U.S., with the exception of New York City and its vicinity. Those members are represented by Local 829, the United Scenic Artists. In the rest of Canada, production designers are represented by the Directors Guild of Canada. In the United Kingdom, members of the art department are represented by the non-union British Film Designers Guild.

The production design credit must be requested by a film's producer prior to completion of photography, and submitted to the Art Directors Guild Board of Directors for the credit approval.

== See also ==
- Academy Award for Best Production Design
- Art Directors Guild Hall of Fame
- List of British production designers
- Category:Production designers
- Category:Women production designers
- Scenic design
