= Mad Max (film) =

1979 Australian dystopian action film

- Australian theatrical release poster
- Directed by: George Miller
- Screenplay by: James McCausland; George Miller
- Story by: George Miller; Byron Kennedy
- Produced by: Byron Kennedy
- Starring: Mel Gibson; Joanne Samuel; Hugh Keays-Byrne; Steve Bisley; Tim Burns; Roger Ward
- Cinematography: David Eggby
- Edited by: Tony Paterson; Cliff Hayes
- Music by: Brian May
- Production company: Kennedy Miller Productions
- Distributed by: Roadshow Film Distributors
- Release dates: 12 April 1979 (Australia); 21 March 1980 (United States)
- Running time: 93 minutes
- Country: Australia
- Language: English
- Budget: A$350,000–400,000
- Box office: US$100 million

Mad Max is a 1979 Australian dystopian action film directed by George Miller in his directorial debut, who co-wrote the screenplay with James McCausland, based on a story by Miller and Byron Kennedy. Mel Gibson stars as "Mad" Max Rockatansky, a police officer turned vigilante in a dystopian near-future Australia in the midst of societal collapse. Joanne Samuel, Hugh Keays-Byrne, Steve Bisley, Tim Burns and Roger Ward also appear in supporting roles.

Principal photography for Mad Max took place in and around Melbourne and lasted for six weeks. The film initially received a polarised reception upon its release in April 1979, although it won four AACTA Awards. Filmed on a budget of A$400,000, it earned more than US$100 million worldwide in gross revenue and set a Guinness record for most profitable film. The success of Mad Max has been credited for further opening the global market to Australian New Wave films.

Mad Max became the first in the series, giving rise to three sequels: Mad Max 2 (1981), Mad Max Beyond Thunderdome (1985) and Mad Max: Fury Road (2015). A spin-off film titled Furiosa: A Mad Max Saga was released in 2024.

== Plot ==
A dystopian near-future Australia is facing a breakdown of civil order primarily owing to widespread oil shortages and ecocide. The berserk motorbike gang member Crawford "Nightrider" Montazano kills a rookie officer of the poorly funded Main Force Patrol (MFP)—one of the last remaining law enforcement agencies—and escapes with his girlfriend in a Pursuit Special. Nightrider is able to elude the MFP until the organisation's top pursuit man Max Rockatansky manages to steer him into a roadblock, resulting in a fiery crash that kills both Nightrider and his girlfriend.

At the MFP garage, Max is shown his new police car: a specially built V8-powered and supercharged black Pursuit Special. A conversation between Max's superior Captain Fred "Fifi" Macaffee and Police commissioner Labatouche reveals the Pursuit Special was authorised to bribe Max, who is becoming weary of police work, into staying on the force. Nightrider's motorbike gang, which is led by Toecutter and Bubba Zanetti, run riot in a town, vandalising property, stealing fuel and terrorising the populace. A young couple attempts to escape, but the gang destroys their car and assaults them. Max and fellow officer Jim "Goose" Rains arrest Toecutter's young protégé Johnny the Boy at the scene. No witnesses appear in court and Johnny is deemed mentally unfit to stand trial. Against Goose's furious objections, Johnny is released into Bubba's custody.

While Goose visits a nightclub in the city that night, Johnny sabotages his police motorbike, causing it to lock up at high speed the next day and launch Goose off the road. Dazed but uninjured, Goose borrows a ute to haul his bike back to MFP headquarters. On the way, Johnny throws a brake drum through his windscreen and Goose crashes again. Toecutter urges and forces a reluctant Johnny to throw a match into the wreck of the ute, burning Goose alive. After seeing Goose's charred body in the hospital ICU, Max informs Fifi that he is resigning from the MFP to save what is left of his sanity. Fifi convinces him to take some time off before committing to his decision, so Max goes on a trip in his panel van with his wife Jessie and infant son "Sprog" (Australian slang for a child). When they stop to fix the spare tyre, Jessie takes Sprog to get ice cream and is accosted by Toecutter and his gang. She escapes and the family hides on a remote farm owned by an elderly friend, May Swaisey.

The gang continues pursuing Jessie through the woods, capturing Sprog while Max is out looking for them. May helps Jessie free the boy and the trio escapes in the station wagon, which then breaks down. Jessie grabs Sprog and runs down the road until the gang simply runs them over. Sprog is killed instantly, while a comatose Jessie is held in the ICU, in critical condition. Driven into a rage by the attack on his family, Max dons his police uniform and takes the black Pursuit Special, without authorisation, to pursue and eliminate the gang members. He kills several of them before being caught in a trap set by Toecutter, Bubba and Johnny; Bubba shoots Max in the leg and drives over his arm. Max is then able to shoot Bubba, in return, with a sawn-off shotgun. Toecutter and Johnny ride off; Max staggers to his car and chases Toecutter, whom he forces into the path of an approaching semi-trailer, killing him.

Finally, Max finds Johnny at the scene of a car wreck, stealing the boots of the deceased driver. He argues he is not to blame in the deaths of Max's family, but Max handcuffs Johnny's foot to the overturned vehicle and creates a crude time-delay fuse using leaking petroleum and Johnny's own cigarette lighter. He gives Johnny a hacksaw, saying Johnny can either try to saw through the handcuffs in time to escape or take the quicker route of sawing through his own ankle. Max leaves Johnny to make his choice and drives away, with the vehicle blowing up in the distance.

== Cast ==
- Mel Gibson as Max Rockatansky, a police officer in the Main Force Patrol (MFP)
- Joanne Samuel as Jessie Rockatansky, Max's wife
- Hugh Keays-Byrne as Toecutter, the leader of a motorcycle gang
- Steve Bisley as Jim "Goose" Rains, a member of the MFP's motorcycle unit
- Tim Burns as Johnny the Boy, a young member of Toecutter's gang
- Roger Ward as Fred "Fifi" Macaffee, Max's MFP captain
- David Bracks as Mudguts, a member of Toecutter's gang
- David Cameron as Underground Mechanic, who builds the V-8 Pursuit Special
- Robina Chaffey as Singer, who performs at the Sugartown Cabaret
- Stephen Clark as Sarse, an MFP officer (Scuttle's partner)
- Reg Evans as Station Master
- Max Fairchild as Benno, May's large adult son, who has an intellectual disability
- Sheila Florance as May Swaisey, an old friend of Max
- Hunter Gibb as Lair, a man with a Chevvy who is attacked by Toecutter's gang
- Vincent Gil as Crawford "The Nightrider" Montazano, a member of Toecutter's gang
- Jonathan Hardy as Labatouche, an English-born police commissioner who oversees the MFP
- Brendan Heath as "Sprog" Rockatansky, Max and Jessie's infant son
- Paul Johnstone as Cundalini, a member of Toecutter's gang who loses a hand
- Nick Lathouris as Grease Rat, a mechanic near a beach
- John Ley as Charlie, a religious MFP officer (Roop's partner)
- Steve Millichamp as Roop, an MFP officer (Charlie's partner)
- George Novak as Scuttle, an MFP officer (Sarse's partner)
- Geoff Parry as Bubba Zanetti, Toecutter's second in command
- Lulu Pinkus as Nightrider's Girl
- Kim Sullivan as Girl in Chevvy, who, along with Lair, is attacked by Toecutter's gang
- Amanda Muggleton as Biker's Moll (uncredited)
- Lisa Aldenhoven as Nurse
- Karen Moregold as Radio Dispatcher (uncredited)

== Production ==
=== Development ===
George Miller was a medical doctor in Sydney, working in a hospital emergency room where he saw many injuries and deaths of the types depicted in the film. He also witnessed many car accidents growing up in rural Queensland and lost at least three friends to accidents as a teenager.

While in residency at a Sydney hospital, Miller met amateur filmmaker Byron Kennedy at a summer film school in 1971. The two men produced a short film, Violence in the Cinema, Part 1, which was screened at a number of film festivals and won several awards. Eight years later, they produced Mad Max, working with first-time screenwriter James McCausland (who appears early in the film as the bearded man in an apron in front of the diner).

According to Miller, his interest while writing Mad Max was "a silent movie with sound", employing highly kinetic images reminiscent of Buster Keaton and Harold Lloyd while the narrative itself was basic and simple. Miller believed that audiences would find his violent story more believable if set in a bleak dystopian future. He knew little about writing a script, but he had read Pauline Kael's essay "Raising Kane" and concluded that most major American scriptwriters, like Herman Mankiewicz and Ben Hecht, were former journalists, so he hired McCausland, the Melbourne finance editor of The Australian, with whom he had previously bonded at a party as a fellow film buff. McCausland was paid roughly $3,500 for about a year's worth of writing.

The basic concept for the film was already established when McCausland was brought on to the project. He worked from a one-page outline prepared by Miller, writing each evening from about 7 pm to midnight. Miller would then arrive at 6 am to confer. McCausland had never written a script before and did no formal or informal study in preparation, other than going repeatedly to the cinema with Miller and discussing the dramatic structure of westerns, road movies, and action films. McCausland described taking the lead in writing the dialogue, while Miller was concerned with giving his thoughts on the narrative context of each part and thinking through the visual beats of how things would unfold on screen. The ornate and hyper-verbal speech of Mad Max's villains, like the manic Nightrider in the opening sequence, which would recur through the subsequent films in the franchise, in this sense stems from McCausland's work, albeit under Miller's instruction. McCausland drew heavily from his observations of the effects of the 1973 oil crisis on Australian motorists:

Yet there were further signs of the desperate measures individuals would take to ensure mobility. A couple of oil strikes that hit many pumps revealed the ferocity with which Australians would defend their right to fill a tank. Long queues formed at the stations with petrol—and anyone who tried to sneak ahead in the queue met raw violence. ... George and I wrote the [Mad Max] script based on the thesis that people would do almost anything to keep vehicles moving and the assumption that nations would not consider the huge costs of providing infrastructure for alternative energy until it was too late.

— James McCausland, writing on peak oil in The Courier-Mail, 2006

Kennedy and Miller first took the film to Graham Burke of Roadshow, who was enthusiastic. The producers felt they would be unable to raise money from the government bodies "because Australian producers were making art films, and the corporations and commissions seemed to endorse them whole-heartedly", according to Kennedy. They designed a 40-page presentation, circulated it widely, and eventually raised the money. Kennedy and Miller also contributed funds themselves by doing three months of emergency medical calls, with Kennedy driving the car while Miller did the doctoring. Miller claimed the final budget was between $350,000 and $400,000. His brother Bill Miller was an associate producer on the film.

=== Casting ===
George Miller considered casting an American actor to "get the film seen as widely as possible" and even travelled to Los Angeles, but eventually opted to not do so as "the whole budget would be taken up by a so-called American name." Instead, the cast deliberately featured lesser-known actors, so they did not carry past associations with them. Miller's first choice for the role of Max was the Irish-born James Healey, who at the time worked at a Melbourne abattoir and was seeking a new acting job. Upon reading the script, Healey declined, finding the meager, terse dialogue unappealing.

Casting director Mitch Mathews invited a class of recent National Institute of Dramatic Art graduates to audition for Mad Max, specifically asking a NIDA teacher for "spunky young guys". Among these actors was American-born Mel Gibson, whose audition impressed Miller and Matthews and earned him the role of Max. An apocryphal tale stated that Gibson went to auditions with a beat-up face following a fight, but this has been denied by both Matthews and Miller. Gibson's friend and classmate Steve Bisley, who had worked with him in his only previous screen role, 1976's Summer City, was cast as Max's partner Jim Goose. A classmate of both, Judy Davis, has been said to have auditioned and been passed over, but Miller has declared she was only in Matthews' studio to accompany Gibson and Bisley.

Most of the biker gang extras were members of actual Australian motorcycle clubs and rode their own motorcycles in the film. They were even forced to ride the motorcycles from their residence in Sydney to the shooting locations in Melbourne because the budget did not allow for aerial transport. Three of the main cast members (Hugh Keays-Byrne, Roger Ward and Vincent Gil) had previously appeared in Stone, a 1974 film about biker gangs that is said to have inspired Miller.

=== Vehicles ===
Max's yellow Interceptor was a 1974 Ford Falcon XB sedan (previously a Victoria police car) with a 351 c.i.d. Cleveland V8 engine.

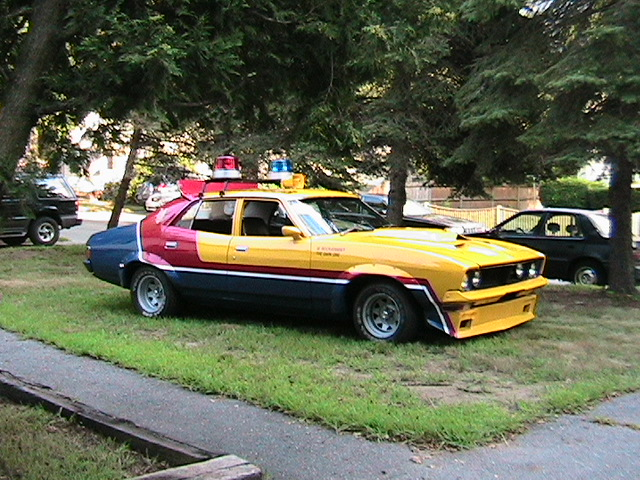
Mad Max Interceptor replica outside the Boston, Massachusetts, area

The Big Bopper, driven by Roop and Charlie, was also a 1974 Ford Falcon XB sedan and a former Victoria police car, but was powered by a 302 c.i.d. V8. The March Hare, driven by Sarse and Scuttle, was an in-line-six-powered 1972 Ford Falcon XA sedan (this car was formerly a Melbourne taxi cab).

Max's black Pursuit Special was a 1973 Ford XB Falcon GT351, a limited edition hardtop (sold in Australia from December 1973 to August 1976), which was primarily modified by Murray Smith, Peter Arcadipane, and Ray Beckerley. The main modifications were the Concorde front end, and the supercharger protruding through the bonnet (a nonfunctional cosmetic feature). The Concorde front was a fairly new accessory at the time, designed by Peter Arcadipane at Ford Australia as a showpiece, and later became available to the general public because of its popularity. After filming for Mad Max was completed, the car went up for sale, but no buyer was found, so it was given to Smith. He kept it until Miller wanted to use it for Mad Max 2, after which it again found no buyers and was left at a wrecking yard in Adelaide. It was bought and restored by Bob Forsenko, who later sold it to the Cars of the Stars Motor Museum in Cumbria, England. When that museum closed, the car then went to a collection in the Dezer Museum in Miami, Florida.

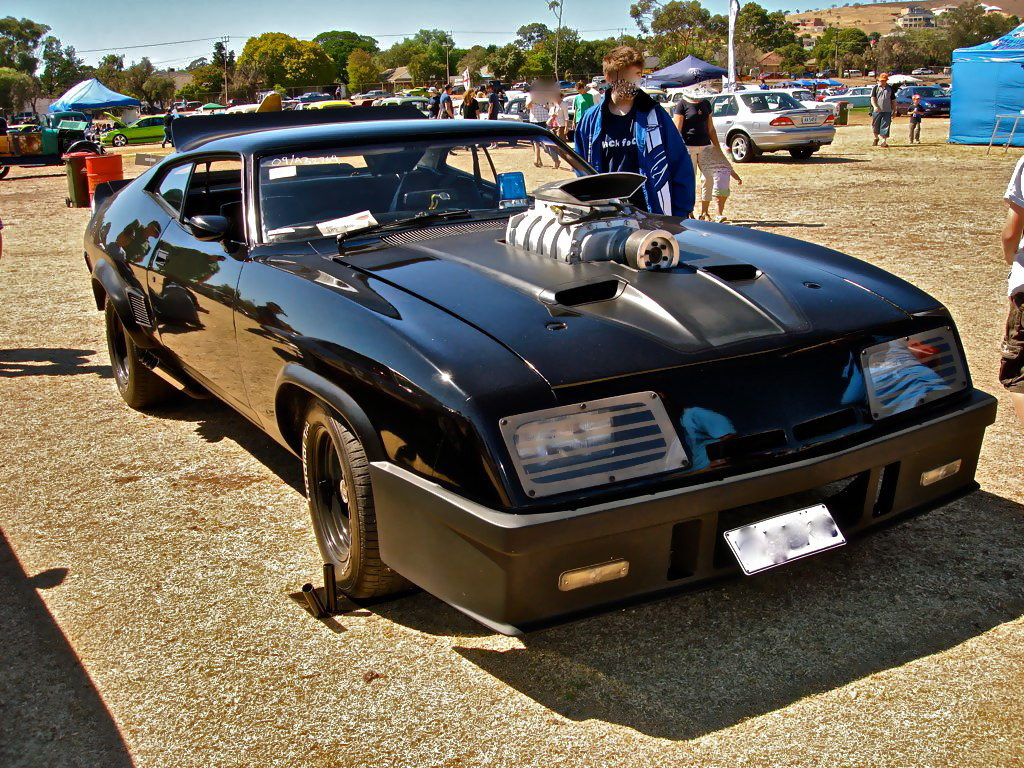
Replica Mad Max Pursuit Special vehicle outside the Silverton Hotel

The Nightrider's vehicle, another Pursuit Special, was a 1972 Holden HQ Monaro coupe. It was also tuned, but was deliberately damaged to make it look like it had been involved in crashes.

The car driven by the young couple that is vandalised and then finally destroyed by the bikers is a 1959 Chevrolet Bel Air Sedan modified to look like a hot rod, with fake fuel injection stacks, fat tires, and a flame-red paint job.

Of the motorcycles that appear in the film, 14 were Kawasaki Kz1000 donated by a local Kawasaki dealer. All were modified in appearance by Melbourne business La Parisienne: one as the MFP bike ridden by Goose, and the balance for members of Toecutter's gang, many of which were portrayed by members of a local Victorian motorcycle club, the Vigilantes.

The small blue van destroyed after being hit by The Big Bopper is a 1966 Mazda Bongo. It was the director's personal vehicle but contrary to popular belief his van was not destroyed. For the stunt it is replaced by another Bongo, in poor condition and engineless, salvaged from a scrapyard and hastily repainted. Moreover, the paint cans on its roof are actually filled with milk, which would be easier to clean after filming.

By the end of filming, fourteen vehicles had been destroyed in the chase and crash scenes.

=== Filming ===
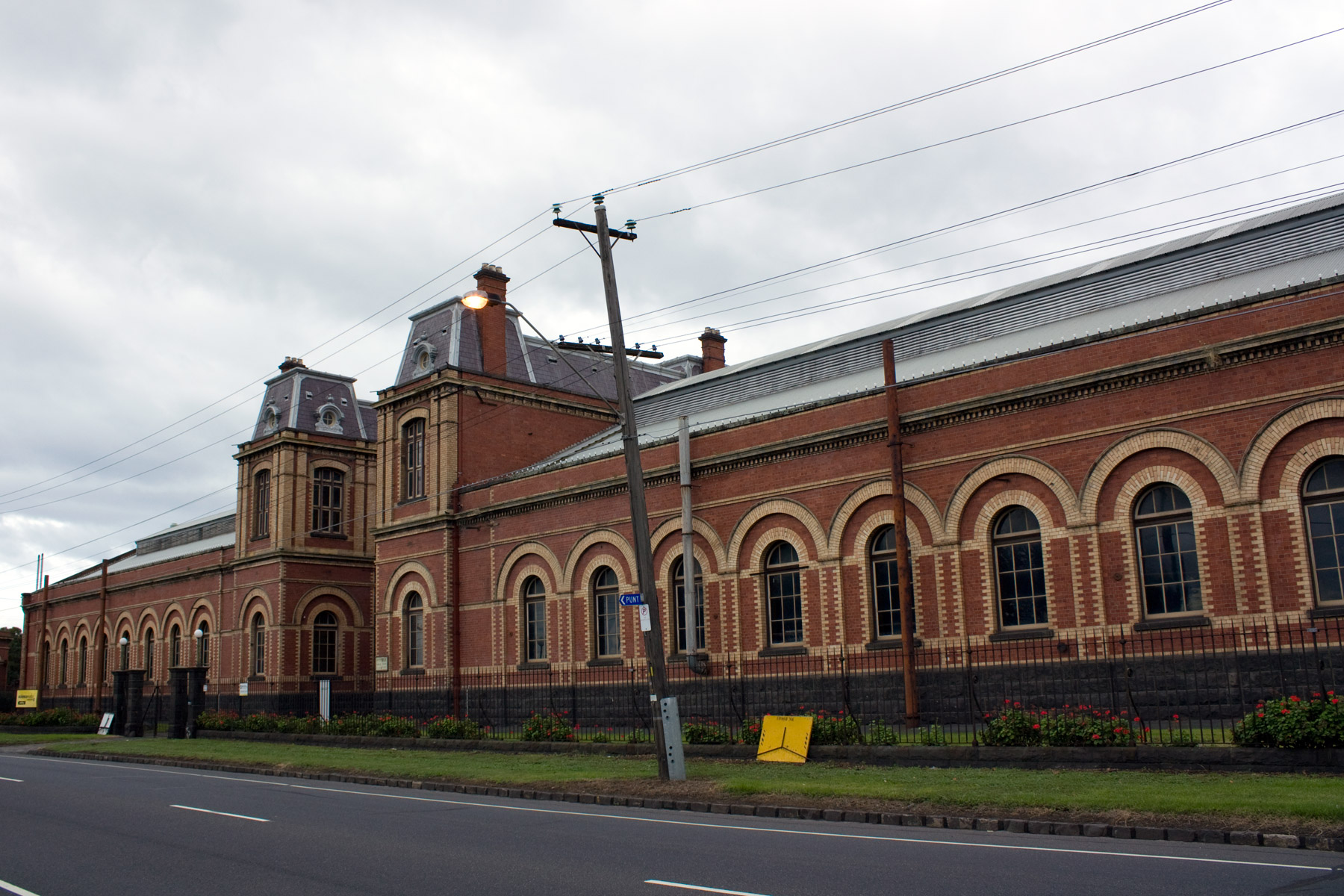
Spotswood Pumping Station in Melbourne served as the headquarters of the Main Force Patrol.

Originally, filming was scheduled to take ten weeks: six weeks of first unit, and four weeks on stunt and chase sequences. However, four days into shooting, Rosie Bailey, who was originally cast as Max's wife, was injured in a bike accident. Production was halted, and Bailey was replaced by Joanne Samuel, causing a two-week delay. In the end, the shoot lasted six weeks in November and December 1977, with a further six weeks of second-unit work. The unit reconvened in May 1978 and spent another two weeks doing second-unit shots and re-staging some stunts.

Miller described the whole experience as "guerrilla filmmaking", with the crew closing roads without filming permits and not using walkie-talkies because their frequency coincided with the police radio, and he and Kennedy would even sweep down the roads after filming was done. As filming progressed, however, the Victoria Police became interested in the production, and they began to help the crew by closing down roads and escorting vehicles. Because of the film's limited budget, all but one of the police uniforms in the film were made of vinyl leather, with only one genuine leather uniform made for stunt sequences involving Bisley and Gibson. Some of the few specific scenes involved the actors themselves driving the vehicles (Hugh Keays-Byrne, some gang members, and Mel Gibson himself) when it was necessary for them to appear in the shots, without the need to use stunt doubles.

Filming took place in and around Melbourne. Many of the car chase scenes were filmed near the town of Little River, northeast of Geelong. The early town scenes with Toecutter's gang were filmed in the main street of Clunes, north of Ballarat; much of the streetscape remains unchanged. The bunker on which Roop was sitting, the site where Goose takes his ride, and the gate Big Bopper slides through are in Point Wilson.

At the beginning of production, the team faced a number of problems, and Miller was not sure that he would be able to finish the film. At one point, Miller quit and producing partner Byron Kennedy rang up Brian Trenchard-Smith and inquired if he would take over. Trenchard-Smith's advice was to hire instead a quality first assistant director to support George. After a couple of days, Miller rallied and completed the film, but the crew had little respect for him during the shoot.

Safety control was supervised by Ian Goddard, an internationally known motorcycle racer. Goddard and his four assistants, aided by an extensive radio communications network, were so diligent in their work that not a single accident occurred during filming.

Mad Max was one of the first Australian films to be shot with a widescreen anamorphic lens, although Peter Weir's The Cars That Ate Paris (1974) was shot in anamorphic four years earlier. Miller's desire to shoot in anamorphic made him seek out a set of Todd-AO wide-angle lenses that Sam Peckinpah had discarded in Australia after they became damaged while filming The Getaway (1972). The only lens that worked properly was a 35mm lens, which Miller employed to shoot the whole of Mad Max.

=== Post-production ===
The film's post-production was done at a friend's apartment in North Melbourne, with Miller and Kennedy editing the film in the small lounge room on a home-built editing machine that Kennedy's father, an engineer, had designed for them. Miller and Kennedy also performed sound editing there. Tony Patterson spent four months editing the film, then had to leave because he was contracted to work on Dimboola (1979). George Miller took over editing with Cliff Hayes, and they worked for an additional three months. Kennedy and Miller did the final cut, in a process Miller described as "he would cut sound in the lounge room and I'd cut picture in the kitchen."

Professional sound engineer Roger Savage performed the sound mixing in a studio after finishing his work for Little River Band. He employed timecoding techniques that were previously unseen in Australian cinema.

=== Music ===
The musical score for Mad Max was composed and conducted by Australian composer Brian May (not to be confused with the guitarist of the English rock band Queen). Miller wanted a Gothic, Bernard Herrmann–type score and hired May after hearing his work for Patrick (1978). May said: "With the little budget that we had we went ahead and did it, and spent a lot of time on it. George was marvelous to work with; he had a lot of ideas about what he wanted although he wasn't a musician."

A soundtrack album was released in 1980 by Varèse Sarabande.

== Release ==
Mad Max was first released in Australia through Roadshow Film Distributors (now Roadshow Films) in 1979. It was sold overseas for $1.8 million—American International Pictures (AIP) acquired the distribution rights for the United States (it would be one of the last films released by AIP before the company was folded into Filmways), while Warner Bros. handled the rest of the world. The film was banned in New Zealand and Sweden, in the former because the scene in which Goose is burned alive inside his vehicle unintentionally mirrored an incident with a real gang shortly before the film's release. In 1983, after the success of the sequel, Mad Max was shown in New Zealand with an R18 certificate. The ban in Sweden was removed in 2005, and the film has since been shown on television and sold on home media there.

When Mad Max was released in the United States in 1980, the original Australian dialogue was redubbed by American voice actors, and much of the Australian slang and terminology was replaced (examples: "Oi!" became "Hey!", "See looks!" became "See what I see?", "windscreen" became "windshield", "very toey" became "super hot", and "proby"—probationary officer—became "rookie"). AIP also altered the operator's duty call on Jim Goose's bike in the beginning of the film (it ended with "Come on, Goose, where are you?"). The only exceptions to the dubbing were the singer in the Sugartown Cabaret (played by Robina Chaffey), Charlie (played by John Ley) when he speaks through the mechanical voice box, and Goose (Steve Bisley) when he sings while driving the truck before being ambushed. Since Mel Gibson was not well known to American audiences at the time, trailers and television spots in the United States emphasised the film's action content. The original Australian dialogue track was finally released in North America in 2000 in a limited theatrical reissue by MGM (now an Amazon subsidiary) (the film's current rights holders in North America), and the film has since been released in the US on DVD with the American and Australian soundtracks included on separate audio tracks.

=== Home media ===
The film was released on DVD on 1 January 2002 and re-released on DVD on 15 September 2015. It was released on Blu-ray on 5 October 2010 and re-released on Blu-ray on 15 September 2015 by 20th Century Fox Home Entertainment. Kino Lorber (on behalf of Warner Bros. Home Entertainment, under license to MGM Home Entertainment) released the film on 4K Blu-ray Disc on 24 November 2020. On 16 November 2021, it was reissued in 4K along with the three other films in the series as part of the Mad Max Anthology 4K set from Warner Bros. Home Entertainment (via Studio Distribution Services).

== Reception ==
=== Box office ===
Mad Max grossed A$5,355,490 at the box office in Australia and over US$100 million worldwide. Given its small production budget, it was the most profitable film ever made at the time and held the Guinness World Record for the highest box-office-to-budget ratio of any motion picture until the release of The Blair Witch Project (1999).

=== Critical response ===
Upon its release, the film polarised critics. In a 1979 review, the Australian social commentator and film producer Phillip Adams condemned Mad Max, suggesting it would promote violence, saying that it had "all the emotional uplift of Mein Kampf" and would be "a special favourite of rapists, sadists, child murderers and incipient Mansons". (Note: Adams has since remained a prominent opponent of screen violence. He has also been consistent in his criticism of Mel Gibson's political and social opinions.) After its United States release, Tom Buckley of The New York Times called the film "ugly and incoherent", and Stephen King, writing in Danse Macabre, called it a "turkey". However, Variety magazine praised the directorial debut by Miller.

On review aggregator website Rotten Tomatoes, the film holds an 89% approval rating based on 70 reviews, with an average score of 7.7/10; the site's "critics consensus" reads: "Staging the improbable car stunts and crashes to perfection, director George Miller succeeds completely in bringing the violent, post-apocalyptic world of Mad Max to visceral life." The film has been included in "best 1,000 films of all time" lists from The New York Times and The Guardian.

=== Accolades ===
List of awards and nominations
Award	Category	Recipients	Result
AACTA Award (1979 AFI Awards)	Best Film	Byron Kennedy	Nominated
AACTA Award (1979 AFI Awards)	Best Direction	George Miller	Nominated
AACTA Award (1979 AFI Awards)	Best Original Screenplay	James McCausland and George Miller	Nominated
AACTA Award (1979 AFI Awards)	Best Supporting Actor	Hugh Keays-Byrne	Nominated
AACTA Award (1979 AFI Awards)	Best Editing	Cliff Hayes and Tony Paterson	Won
AACTA Award (1979 AFI Awards)	Best Original Music Score	Brian May	Won
AACTA Award (1979 AFI Awards)	Best Sound	Ned Dawson, Byron Kennedy, Roger Savage, and Gary Wilkins	Won
AACTA Award (1979 AFI Awards)	Special Award for Stunt Work	Grant Page	Won
Avoriaz Fantastic Film Festival	Special Jury Award	George Miller	Won

== See also ==
- List of cult films

== Bibliography ==
- Melvin Zed (2022). Mad Max : ultraviolence dans le cinéma, partie 1 (1966-1979) (in French). Rififi. ISBN 2958046818..
