= Chris Richmond (film producer) =

British film designer

Chris Richmond is a British film and television production designer. He started his career in the film industry in 1998 as an art department runner on the BBC drama 'Births, marriages and deaths'.

== Career ==
Richmond started his career in the film industry in 1998 as an art department runner on the BBC drama 'Births, marriages and deaths', starring Ray Winstone, Mark Strong and Phil Davis.

He was promoted to the standby Art Director and worked on a number of award-winning films and television dramas including Control, Endgame and The Queen's Sister. During his career, Richmond has worked with a number of notable directors, including Pete Travis, Simon Cellan Jones, Jez Butterworth, Saul Metzstein, Carol Morley and Matt Hope.

He rose to the position of production designer in 2007, working on the third series of the interactive drama Dubplate Drama. He has since worked on a number of feature films as production designer. In 2010, Richmond served as a designer on the feature film The Veteran starring Toby Kebbell and Brian Cox. He got praise for his work, with a "Contactmusic.net" review describing it as "fiercely stylised production design adds an intriguing layer to this gritty, twisty London thriller."

Richmond is a visiting lecturer at the London College of Communication in film and television production design. Chris Richmond designed the feature-length drama documentary, Dreams of a Life, nominated for the Grierson Award at the 55th London Film Festival.

== Filmography ==
=== Production designer ===
- Twenty8k (film)(2012)
- Dreams of a Life (film) (2011)
- Eight Minutes Idle (film) (2011)
- Magic Boys (film) (2011)
- The Veteran (film) (2011)
- Edge (film) (2010)
- Dubplate Drama (film) (2008)

=== Art director ===
- Micro Men (TV movie) (2009)
- Endgame (film) (2009)
- A Boy Called Dad (film) (2009)
- Control (film) (2007)
- Almost Adult (film) (2006)
- The Queen's Sister (TV movie) (2005)
- A Very Social Secretary (TV movie) (2005)
- Reach For The Moon (TV mini series) (2000)
- City Central (TV series) (1998)

=== Art department ===
- Heroes and Villains (film) (2006)(Video Graphics Designer)
- Bloodlines (TV movie) (2005)(Graphics Designer)
- Birthday Girl (film) (2001)(Art Department Assistant)
- Births, Marriages and Deaths (TV series) (1999) (Art Department Runner)
- Thief Takers (TV series) (1995)(Set Designer)
