= Mad Max: Fury Road =

2015 film by George Miller

- Australian theatrical release poster
- Directed by: George Miller
- Written by: George Miller; Brendan McCarthy; Nico Lathouris
- Based on: Characters by: George Miller; Byron Kennedy
- Produced by: Doug Mitchell; George Miller; PJ Voeten
- Starring: Tom Hardy; Charlize Theron; Nicholas Hoult; Hugh Keays-Byrne; Josh Helman; Nathan Jones; Rosie Huntington-Whiteley; Riley Keough; Zoë Kravitz; Abbey Lee; Courtney Eaton
- Cinematography: John Seale
- Edited by: Margaret Sixel
- Music by: Junkie XL
- Production companies: Village Roadshow Pictures; Kennedy Miller Mitchell
- Distributed by: Roadshow Entertainment (Australia); Warner Bros. Pictures (International)
- Release dates: 7 May 2015 (TCL Chinese Theatre); 14 May 2015 (Australia); 15 May 2015 (United States)
- Running time: 120 minutes
- Countries: Australia; United States
- Language: English
- Budget: $154.6–185.1 million
- Box office: $380.4 million

Mad Max: Fury Road is a 2015 Australian post-apocalyptic action film co-written, co-produced and directed by George Miller, who collaborated with Brendan McCarthy and Nico Lathouris on the screenplay. The fourth instalment in the Mad Max franchise, it was produced by Village Roadshow Pictures and Kennedy Miller Mitchell, and distributed by Roadshow Entertainment in Australia and by Warner Bros. Pictures internationally. The film stars Tom Hardy and Charlize Theron, with Nicholas Hoult, Hugh Keays-Byrne (in his final film role), Josh Helman, Nathan Jones, Rosie Huntington-Whiteley, Riley Keough, Zoë Kravitz, Abbey Lee, and Courtney Eaton. Set in a post-apocalyptic desert wasteland where petrol and water are scarce commodities, it follows Max Rockatansky (Hardy), who joins forces with Imperator Furiosa (Theron) against warlord Immortan Joe (Keays-Byrne) and his army, leading to a lengthy road battle.

Miller came up with the idea for Mad Max: Fury Road in 1987, but the film spent many years in development hell before pre-production began in 1998. Attempts to shoot the film in the 2000s were delayed numerous times due to the September 11 attacks, the Iraq War, and controversies surrounding star Mel Gibson, leading Miller to recast Gibson's role of Max Rockatansky. Miller decided to pursue the film again in 2007 after the release of his animated comedy film Happy Feet. In 2009, Miller announced that filming would begin in early 2011. Hardy was cast as Max in June 2010, with production planned to begin that November. Principal photography was delayed several more times before it actually began in July 2012. The film wrapped in December 2012, although additional footage was shot in November 2013.

Mad Max: Fury Road premiered in Los Angeles on 7 May 2015, and was released in Australia on 14 May. The film grossed $380.4 million at the worldwide box office, making it the highest-grossing Mad Max film. It was nominated for ten awards at the 88th Academy Awards (including Best Picture), winning six awards, and received numerous other accolades, including Best Film from the National Board of Review, eight AACTA Awards from twelve nominations including Best Film and Best Direction and was also named one of the top ten films of 2015 by the American Film Institute. It has also been called one of the greatest action films of all time.

A prequel comic book series was published by Vertigo from May to August 2015. A prequel film, Furiosa: A Mad Max Saga, was released on 24 May 2024, with Miller returning as writer and director.

== Plot ==
Max Rockatansky is captured by hydraulic despot cult leader Immortan Joe's War Boys and taken to his fortress called the Citadel. Max, a universal donor, is forced to transfuse his blood to Nux, a sick War Boy.

Meanwhile, Joe sends his lieutenant Imperator Furiosa in the armoured "War Rig" to trade produce and water for petrol and ammunition with two of his allies, the Bullet Farmer and the People Eater. When Joe realises his five sexual slave "wives" whom he imprisoned in order to produce an heir are fleeing in the Rig, he leads his entire army in pursuit, calling on his allies to help. Nux joins the pursuit with Max strapped to his car, and a chasing battle ensues. After entering enemy territory and fending off a rival gang, Furiosa drives into a dust choked supercell and loses all of her pursuers except Nux, who attempts to sacrifice himself to blow up the Rig. Max frees himself and restrains Nux, and Furiosa destroys Nux's car.

After the sandstorm, Max catches Furiosa repairing the Rig, accompanied by Joe's "wives": Toast, Capable, Cheedo, the Dag, and Angharad, the latter two being pregnant with Joe's children. Max fights and subdues Furiosa, but her engine kill switch prevents him from stealing the Rig. Max begrudgingly agrees to help Furiosa's group escape Joe's wrath. Nux sneaks onto the Rig and attempts to kill Furiosa, but the women overpower him and throw Nux out. Nux rejoins Joe's army when it catches up. Furiosa drives through a canyon controlled by a biker gang, having prearranged to trade petrol for safe passage. The bikers betray her when they spot Joe's army approaching, forcing her to flee.

The bikers detonate the canyon walls to block Joe and pursue the Rig as Max and Furiosa fend them off. Joe drives over the blockade in a monster truck and catches up with the Rig. He sends Nux to carjack the Rig, but Nux stumbles and drops his weapon, to Joe's disgust. While helping Max, Angharad falls off the Rig, and Joe fatally runs her over. Capable finds Nux hiding in the Rig and consoles him. At night, Furiosa and Max drive through a swamp and get stuck in the mud. They slow Joe's forces with landmines, but the Bullet Farmer continues the pursuit in his ATV. Furiosa and Max work together to blind the Bullet Farmer and disable his ATV. Moved by Capable's compassion, Nux joins the group and helps get the Rig moving again.

In the morning, Furiosa tells Max that her group is escaping to a "Green Place", the bountiful land where she grew up before being kidnapped and brought to the Citadel. She spots a Green Place watchtower and identifies herself to the woman at top who summons their matriarchal clan called the Vuvalini. The Vuvalini recognise Furiosa as one of their own but inform a devastated Furiosa that the Green Place was the now-uninhabitable swamp from the previous night and that only seven Vuvalini are left. The group decides to ride across an immense salt flat, hoping to find a new home on the other side. Max goes his own way. After seeing a vision of the child he was unable to save, (Note: As seen in Mad Max: Fury Road: Max Comic (vol. 1) #1-#2 where Glory and her mother were run over by the Buzzards and were avenged by Max.) Max catches up with the group and convinces them to return to the Citadel since they do not know what lies beyond the salt flat, but do know that the now-undefended Citadel has ample water and crops.

Joe intercepts them, and in the ensuing battle, five Vuvalini are killed, Toast is captured, and Furiosa is severely wounded. Joe overtakes the Rig as they approach the canyon. While Max fights Joe's son and enforcer Rictus, Furiosa boards Joe's truck to rescue Toast, who distracts Joe, allowing Furiosa to kill him. The remnants of the group drive Joe's truck back to the Citadel, while Nux sacrifices himself by wrecking the Rig to block the canyon behind them, killing Rictus. Max transfuses his blood to Furiosa, saving her life.

Back at the Citadel, the people rejoice upon learning of Joe's death. As Max's companions are lifted to Joe's cliffside fortress, Max and Furiosa glance at each other before Max disappears into the crowd.

== Cast ==
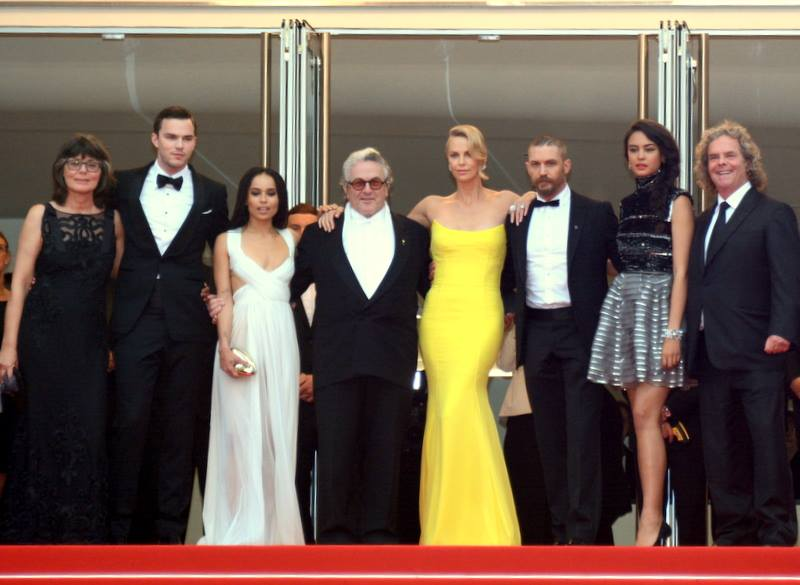
Cast and crew attending the premiere of the film at the 2015 Cannes Film Festival

- Tom Hardy as "Mad Max" Rockatansky, a former police officer
- Charlize Theron as Imperator Furiosa, a woman with a prosthetic left arm with whom Max allies.
- Nicholas Hoult as Nux, a sickly War Boy who Max is briefly chained to
- Hugh Keays-Byrne as Immortan Joe, the ruler of the Citadel
- Josh Helman as Slit, Nux's lancer
- Nathan Jones as Rictus Erectus, Joe's muscular, intellectually disabled son
- Rosie Huntington-Whiteley as The Splendid Angharad, a barefoot woman who is Joe's most "treasured" breeder. Pregnant with his child, she is shown to be strong yet compassionate and protective, and as the de facto leader of the other wives.
- Zoë Kravitz as Toast the Knowing, a barefoot woman who is another of Joe's wives. She is the most practical and intellectual of the five and is shown to have good knowledge of guns. Kravitz wore a dark pixie wig over her natural hair when portraying Toast.
- Riley Keough as Capable, a red-haired woman and another of Joe's wives, she appears to be the most level-headed and mature of the five and forms a bond with the War Boy Nux. Keough's hair was dyed red when portraying Capable.
- Abbey Lee as The Dag, a platinum-haired girl and another of Joe's wives, she has an eccentric and bold personality who is later shown to form a bond with the Keeper of Seeds and is often seen with fellow wife Cheedo the Fragile. Lee wore a platinum wig over her natural hair when portraying the Dag.
- Courtney Eaton as Cheedo the Fragile, a barefoot teenage girl who is the youngest of Joe's wives. She is portrayed as the meekest and most fearful, and is initially afraid to leave Joe. However, she becomes more courageous later on. She is often seen with her fellow wife The Dag.
- John Howard as The People Eater, a minion of Joe who rules Gas Town
- Richard Carter as The Bullet Farmer, a minion of Joe who rules the Bullet Farm
- iOTA as The Doof Warrior (Coma), the eyeless guitarist who travels with Joe's war convoy and whose guitar doubles as a flamethrower
- Angus Sampson as The Organic Mechanic, a doctor who works for Joe
- Jennifer Hagan as Miss Giddy, an old woman who is the caretaker of Joe's wives who aids in their escape.
- Megan Gale as The Valkyrie, the youngest of the Vuvalini and Furiosa's childhood friend
- Melissa Jaffer as Keeper of the Seeds, one of the Vuvalini
- Melita Jurisic, Gillian Jones, Joy Smithers, Antoinette Kellerman, and Christina Koch as The Vuvalini
- Jon Iles as The Ace, head of security on the War Rig
- Quentin Kenihan as Corpus Colossus, Joe's older son who has a physical disability that stunted his growth and prevents him from being able to walk
- Coco Jack Gillies as Glory the Child, the young girl in Max's flashbacks
- Chris Patton as Morsov, a War Boy that was assigned to protect the War Rig when it was en route to the Bullet Farm and Gastown
- Stephen Dunlevy as:
  - The chief of the Rock Riders biker gang who Furiosa attempts to barter with in exchange for safe passage through their canyon
  - The Winchman, a heavily-armed War Boy
- Richard Norton as The Prime Imperator, the Chief of the Imperators and a lieutenant in the War Boys
- Lee Perry as The Many Voices

== Production ==
The film was produced by Doug Mitchell, George Miller, and P. J. Voeten (who was also first assistant director).

=== Development ===
Mad Max: Fury Road had a lengthy gestation period. In 1987, George Miller had the idea of making a Mad Max instalment that was "almost a continuous chase". He got an idea for the plot in 1998 when he was walking across a street in Los Angeles, and about a year later, while travelling from Los Angeles to Australia, a story in which "violent marauders were fighting, not for oil or for material goods, but for human beings" coalesced. Miller said he worked with five storyboard artists to design the film in storyboard form before writing the screenplay, producing about 3,500 panels, which is almost the same as the number of shots as in the finished film, as he wanted the film to be almost a continuous chase, with relatively little dialogue, and to have the visuals come first. The screenplay was written with Nico Lathouris and cult British comic creator Brendan McCarthy, who also designed many of the new characters and vehicles.

The film entered pre-production at 20th Century Fox in the early 2000s and was set to star Mel Gibson, who had portrayed Max Rockatansky in the first three films in the series, with Sigourney Weaver contemplated for the female co-lead which would later become Imperator Furiosa, suggested by Gibson himself after they had worked together in Peter Weir's The Year of Living Dangerously, and Miller agreed on the idea. However, production was indefinitely postponed after the September 11 attacks in 2001 caused "the American dollar [to collapse] against the Australian dollar, and our budget ballooned", as Miller has said in several interviews since the film was released in 2015, or due to security concerns and tightened travel and shipping restrictions during the lead up to the Iraq War caused issues with the proposed Namibian shoot, as had been reported previously. In either event, Miller said he then "had to commit to Happy Feet because we had the digital facility booked to do it", and by the time he got back to work on the Mad Max project four years later, Gibson "had all that turbulence in his life". Both Miller and Gibson himself said the passage of time had made Gibson's age a factor, since the film "wasn't about an old road warrior".

In 2006, Miller said he was thinking about making Fury Road without Gibson. He confirmed his intention to make another Mad Max film in 2007 and stated that he thought Gibson was focused on his own films and was also "too old" to play the part. On 5 March 2009, it was announced that an R-rated animated feature film inspired by Japanese anime, but adapted for Western audiences, was in pre-production that would be taking much of the plot from Fury Road and would not feature Gibson's voice. Miller was also developing an action-adventure tie-in video game based on the fourth film with God of War II designer Cory Barlog. Both projects were expected to take two to two-and-a-half years and, according to Miller, would be released in 2011 or 2012. The animated Fury Road was going to be produced by Dr D Studios, a digital art studio founded in 2008 by Miller and Doug Mitchell.

On 18 May 2009, it was reported that location scouting was underway for Fury Road, which "could go into production later this year". Miller had decided to shoot a live-action film after all, and "already had the various vehicles built for years now – as they were built for the doomed Fury Road shoot". By this time, the project had moved from Fox to Warner Bros. In October, Miller announced that principal photography on Fury Road would commence at Broken Hill, New South Wales in August 2010. That same month, British actor Tom Hardy was in negotiations to take the lead role of Max, and it was also announced that Charlize Theron would play a major role. The finalists for the part of Max were Hardy, Armie Hammer, and Jeremy Renner (who fought for the role), with Michael Fassbender, Joel Kinnaman, Heath Ledger, Eric Bana, and Eminem (who did not wish to leave the United States) all having been considered at various stages of the film's extended development. Hardy announced he had been cast on Friday Night with Jonathan Ross in June 2010. Kat Dennings would reveal in September 2026 that she had auditioned for a role in the film, with a chemistry read alongside Hardy. Gal Gadot would also reveal she auditioned for the film alongside Tom Hiddleston.

In July 2010, Miller announced plans to shoot two Mad Max films back-to-back, entitled Mad Max: Fury Road and Mad Max: Furiosa. Weta Digital was involved with the film when it was scheduled for a 2012 release. The company was to handle visual effects until production was postponed from its November 2010 start date. Specialty physical effects house Wētā Workshop provided conceptual designs, early character look development, prototyping and specialty make-up effects.

After unexpected heavy rains caused wildflowers to grow in the desert around Broken Hill, filming was moved from Broken Hill back to Namibia in November 2011. Other potential locations scouted included the Atacama Desert in Chile, Chott el Djerid in Tunisia, and Azerbaijan.

Miller said he did not feel he had to top the production design of the previous films in the series. Instead, he wanted the design to harken back to the earlier films and reflect the changes of the past 30 years. Colin Gibson, the production designer, said the filmmakers developed an internally consistent history to explain the film's look and justify its use of hot rods. He designed the vehicles in the film, some of which were constructed as early as 2003, and all of which were fully functional. Of the 150 vehicles constructed, only 88 survived to the end of filming, with the others built to facilitate their intended method of destruction. The War Rig, the film's most prominent vehicle, was made by combining a Tatra 815 and Chevrolet Fleetmaster and fusing a Volkswagen Beetle to the hull, among other modifications. The cars were designed with an emphasis on detail and characterisation, and effort was made to show the various characters' attempts to recycle the remains of civilisation and their feelings of guilt and loss.

=== Filming ===
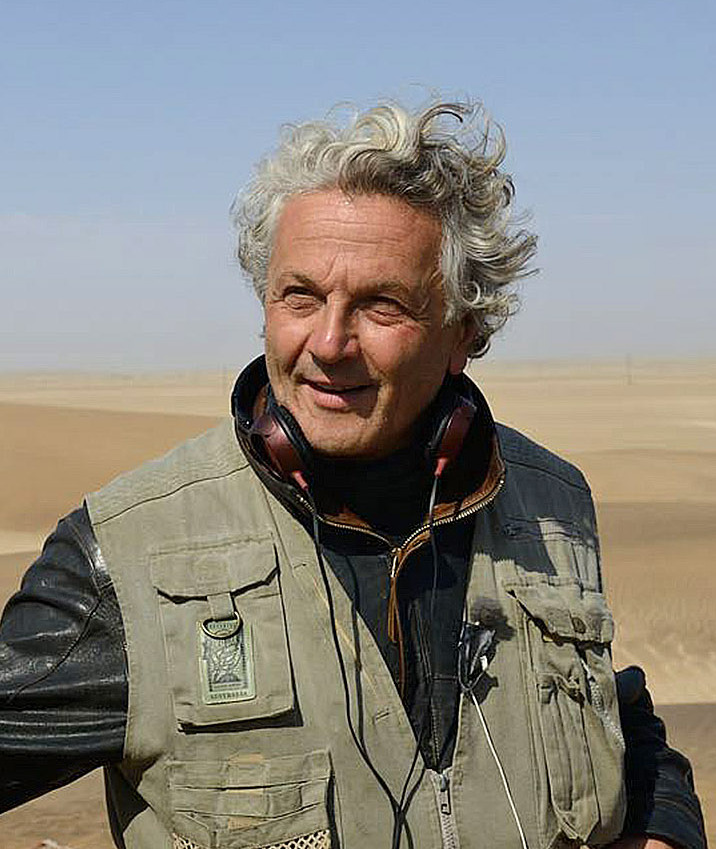
Director George Miller during the shooting of the film in 2012

Cinematographer John Seale came out of retirement to shoot Fury Road, replacing Dean Semler, the cinematographer of the previous two Mad Max films, who left the film near the end of its preparation period. It was the first project Seale filmed with digital cameras. He outfitted his crew with six Arri Alexa Pluses and four Alexa Ms, as well as a number of Canon EOS 5Ds and Olympus PEN E-P5s that were used as crash cams for the action sequences; as the Canon cameras were simple consumer-grade ones, when one would break, the crew would simply source new ones locally from an airport store. Because of the fast-paced editing style Miller intended for the film, he asked Seale to keep the point of interest of each shot in the centre of the frame so the audience did not have to search for it.

Principal photography began in July 2012 in Namibia, with most of the filming based in the Dorob National Park. Some scenes were also shot at the Cape Town Film Studios in Cape Town, South Africa. In October 2012, The Hollywood Reporter reported that Warner Bros. sent an executive to Namibia to keep the production on track. Filming wrapped on 8 December 2012, although the opening and closing scenes at the Citadel had still not been shot.

A draft report from the Namibian Coast Conservation and Management Project that accused the producers of damaging parts of the Namib desert, endangering a number of plant and animal species, was leaked in February 2013. The Namibia Film Commission said it had "no reservations" after visiting the set during production and disputed claims reported in the media, calling the accusations "unjust rhetoric".

Filming went over budget and producers forced the film to wrap before any of the Citadel scenes had been shot. A change of leadership at Warner Bros. later allowed production to continue and the missing scenes be filmed. In September 2013, it was announced that the film would add pick-ups of the opening and closing scenes at the Citadel. Filming continued on 22 November 2013 at Potts Hill and Penrith Lakes in Western Sydney, and concluded in December 2013 at Fox Studios Australia.

Miller invited playwright Eve Ensler to act as an on-set adviser. Impressed with the script's depth and what she saw as feminist themes, she spent a week in Namibia, where she spoke to the actors about issues of violence against women. According to Miller, 90% of the effects in the film were achieved practically. Both the Doof Wagon and the Doof Warrior's guitar are fully functional, and none of his scenes were rendered using CGI—even when the guitar shoots fire. Second unit director and supervising stunt coordinator Guy Norris was in charge of over 150 stunt performers, some of whom were from Cirque du Soleil. Hardy later said he had a hard time seeing Miller's vision during production, which frustrated him. He understood after seeing the finished film, however, and started his Cannes press briefing with a lengthy apology to Miller, calling the director "brilliant". Theron and Hardy clashed on set during filming. Hardy would show up late to set frequently, disrupting the shooting schedule.

=== Post-production ===
Miller recruited his wife, Margaret Sixel, to edit the film, as he felt she could make it stand out from other action films. Sixel had 480 hours of footage to edit, which took three months to watch. The film contains about 2,700 cuts in 120 minutes, or 22.5 cuts per minute, compared to Mad Max 2's 1,200 cuts in 90 minutes, or 13.33 cuts per minute.

According to Seale, "something like 50 or 60 percent of the film is not running at 24 frames a second, which is the traditional frame rate. It'll be running below 24 frames because George, if he couldn't understand what was happening in the shot, he slowed it down until you could ... Or if it was too well understood, he'd shorten it or he'd speed it up back towards 24. His manipulation of every shot in that movie is intense." The Washington Post noted that the changing frame rate gives the film an "almost cartoonishly jerky" look.

The film contains 2,000 visual effects shots. The lead effects company was Iloura, which produced more than 1,500 effects shots for the film. Additional visual effects studios that worked on the film include Method Studios, Brave New World vfx, Stereo D, 4DMax, BlackGinger, The Third Floor, and Dr D Studios. The effects work included altering lighting and time of day, weather effects, terrain replacement, and plate composition.

Sound designer Mark Mangini stated that he viewed the War Rig as an allegory for Moby-Dick, with Immortan Joe playing the role of Captain Ahab. As such, the mechanical truck sounds of the Rig were layered with whale calls to provide a more animal-like quality, and when the tank is pierced with harpoons and milk sprays out, sounds of whales breathing from their blow-holes were incorporated. For the final destruction of the War Rig, the only sounds used were slowed down bear growls to symbolise the death of the truck as a living creature.

Although Miller was contractually obligated to deliver a PG-13 film, Warner Bros. decided to hold test screenings for two different versions: a studio cut and a Miller cut. The Miller cut tested better than the studio cut, so Warner Bros. decided to release the film with an R-rating.

Miller had originally planned to shoot the film in native 3D, but this idea was eventually scrapped, due to both budgetary concerns and doubts that the 3D cameras could withstand the tough desert filming conditions and extensive stunt work, and it was converted to 3D in post-production instead.

== Music ==
The musical score for Mad Max: Fury Road was written by the Dutch composer Junkie XL. Prior to his involvement, Hans Zimmer, John Powell, and Marco Beltrami were attached at separate times to score the film. A soundtrack album was released by WaterTower Music on 12 May 2015.

== Themes ==
=== Survival and humanity ===
Miller described the film's key theme as survival, which he said it has in common with the American Westerns that were "such a staple for the better part of a century in American cinema", while several critics wrote that the primary theme of Mad Max: Fury Road is the attempt to retain humanity in the face of apocalyptic events. Max begins the film as a survivor haunted by visions of deceased people and recovers his humanity by partnering with Furiosa.

=== Feminism ===
Feminism is another theme that has received academic attention. Charlize Theron as Furiosa is the dramatic centre of the film. Throughout, Furiosa demonstrates the physicality of a hero committed to a rescue mission that "sets up the start of a matriarchy as an antidote to the barbarian, warlike tribes that came before". These elements contrast this film with the male-centred stories of the previous Mad Max films.

=== Disability ===
Some literary scholars identified disability as a theme of the film, predominantly due to Furiosa's prosthetic arm. Immortan Joe also deals with disabilities, but is obsessed with able-bodiedness, and is the antithesis to Furiosa's pro-disablism. The film has been praised by disability scholars for its inclusion and treatment of disabled people.

=== Other themes ===
Miller described the film as "a very simple allegory, almost a western on wheels". Further themes pointed out by critics include vengeance, solidarity, home and redemption. Home dominates the motivations of Max, Furiosa and the Five Wives: Max's home was destroyed, Furiosa was taken from her home and the wives are in search of a new home to raise their children. The unity of these characters harnesses a concern for family, which is a common theme in Miller's films (Happy Feet, Happy Feet Two and Babe: Pig in the City). Themes of ecological collapse and moral decadence are also present in the film.

== Release ==
=== Comic books ===
In May 2015, Vertigo Comics began publishing a comic book prequel limited series consisting of four issues, with each issue focusing on the backstory of one or two of the film's characters. The first issue, titled Mad Max: Fury Road – Nux and Immortan Joe #1, was released on 20 May; the second, Mad Max: Fury Road – Furiosa #1, was released on 17 June; the third, Mad Max: Fury Road – Mad Max #1, was released on 8 July; and the fourth, Mad Max: Fury Road – Mad Max #2, was released on 5 August. A deluxe-edition hardcover collection of art inspired by the film, titled Mad Max: Fury Road – Inspired Artists Deluxe Edition, was released by Vertigo on 6 May.

=== Theatrical ===
The film had its world premiere at the TCL Chinese Theatre in Los Angeles on 7 May 2015. It screened out-of-competition at the 68th Cannes Film Festival on 14 May, and it was theatrically released in the United States the next day.

=== Home media ===
Miller said the Blu-ray Disc release of the film would include black-and-white and silent versions of the film, with the latter accompanied by the musical score, and described the black-and-white cut as the best version. However, when details for the initial UK and US releases of the Blu-ray were announced, the alternate cuts were missing. The film was released on both 3D and standard Blu-ray as well as DVD in the UK on 5 October 2015. In the US, it was released digitally on 11 August 2015, and physically on 1 September. In addition to the stand-alone release, a box set containing all four Mad Max films and a documentary about the series titled The Madness of Max was released the same day.

Producer Doug Mitchell confirmed in December 2015 that the black-and-white version of the film existed and could potentially see a future theatrical release. In January 2016, Miller announced that the black-and-white version would appear on a later DVD release, and it debuted as part of the Mad Max: High Octane anthology released in October 2016, with the black-and-white version of Fury Road called the Black & Chrome Edition. The Black & Chrome Edition was made without the involvement of cinematographer John Seale, but Seale said the idea was "beautifully dramatic" and he thought "the new version will emphasise" the actors' performances.

Home media editions of Mad Max: Fury Road were among the top-selling video titles in the US in 2015 and 2016. As of 2024, over three million copies have been sold, for a total revenue of $56.9 million.

== Reception ==
=== Box office ===
Mad Max: Fury Road grossed $154.3 million in the United States and Canada, and $226.1 million in other countries, for a worldwide total of $380.4 million against a production budget of $154.6–185.1 million. It was the 21st-highest-grossing film of 2015. Although the film made a gross profit, The Hollywood Reporter calculated that the net loss incurred by the film was around $20–40 million.

In the United States and Canada, the film was released in 3,702 theatres the same weekend as Pitch Perfect 2. It earned $16.77 million its opening day, which included $3.7 million from Thursday night screenings at 3,000 theatres. The film grossed $45.4 million its opening weekend, finishing in second at the box office behind Pitch Perfect 2 ($69.2 million).

=== Critical response ===
On the review aggregator website Rotten Tomatoes, 97% of 440 critics' reviews are positive, with an average rating of 8.70/10. The website's "critics consensus" reads: "With exhilarating action and a surprising amount of narrative heft, Mad Max: Fury Road brings George Miller's post-apocalyptic franchise roaring vigorously back to life." Metacritic, which uses a weighted average, assigned the film a score of 91 out of 100, based on 53 critics, indicating "universal acclaim". Audiences polled by CinemaScore gave the film an average grade of "B+" on an A+ to F scale.

Robbie Collin of The Daily Telegraph gave the film a full five out of five and praised its acting, screenplay, choreography, stunts, humour, and direction, describing it as a "Krakatoan eruption of craziness". Peter Bradshaw of The Guardian awarded it four out of five and wrote that it is "extravagantly deranged, ear-splittingly cacophonous, and entirely over the top", a "bizarre convoy chase action-thriller in the post-apocalyptic desert". Lindsay Bahr of the Associated Press described the film as "radically visionary". Robert W. Butler of The Kansas City Star gave the film a scoring of three out of four, saying, "A mind-boggling exercise in pure action Mad Max: Fury Road is overwhelming, achieving the sort of visual poetry typically ascribed to Ben-Hur's chariot race or one of Sam Peckinpah's blood ballets".

IGN reviewer Scott Collura gave the film 9.2 out of 10, writing, "The over-the-top stunts and eccentric characters and designs are all hugely important to Fury Road, as are the troubled figures like Max himself and Furiosa, but it's the overriding sense of the film's uniqueness, its striving to be something more than just another action movie, that is most impressive." Richard Roeper of the Chicago Sun-Times gave the film four out of four and wrote that Theron and Hardy are "one of the best action duos ever, in one of the best action movies". Similarly, Rolling Stone's Peter Travers called the film "a new action classic", and gave particular praise to its editing, costumes, and soundtrack. Mick LaSalle of the San Francisco Chronicle wrote a mixed review, praising the cinematography and Theron's performance, but describing the film as a "long, dull chase".

The film has been praised by scholars on several fronts. Women's studies scholars have praised the dominant role taken by Furiosa and the range of atypical female roles, including the wives and the gun-toting Vuvalini, and disability studies scholars have commended its positive, non-stigmatising portrayals of physical and psychological disabilities.

== Accolades and recognition ==
At the 88th Academy Awards, Mad Max: Fury Road received nominations for Best Picture, Best Director, Best Cinematography, and Best Visual Effects; and won Best Film Editing, Best Production Design, Best Costume Design, Best Makeup and Hairstyling, Best Sound Mixing and Best Sound Editing. Its six awards were more than any other film at that year's ceremony and set a new record for the most wins by an Australian film. The film's other nominations include seven British Academy Film Awards (winning four), thirteen Critics' Choice Movie Awards (winning nine), and two Golden Globe Awards. It won Best Film at the National Board of Review Awards 2015, and was named one of the ten best films of 2015 by the American Film Institute.

Listed on over 170 film critics' top-ten lists for 2015, including 58 first-place rankings and 26 second-place rankings, the film topped Metacritic's tally of film critics year-end best film lists, and it was also named Rotten Tomatoes' best scoring film of 2015. A 2016 BBC poll of 177 film critics listed Mad Max: Fury Road as the 19th-best film of the 21st century, and The New York Times placed it nineteenth on its own list. Empire and The Independent respectively named it first and 19th-best in 2020. The film's screenplay was listed number sixty-eight on the Writers Guild of America's "101 Greatest Screenplays of the 21st Century (So Far)" in 2021. The February 2020 issue of New York Magazine lists Mad Max: Fury Road as among "The Best Movies That Lost Best Picture at the Oscars."

In addition, several critics considered Fury Road to be one of the greatest action films ever made, while it appeared on numerous "best films of the decade" lists. It was ranked first on The A.V. Club critics' "The 100 Best Movies of the 2010s", third on Variety's "The Best Films of the Decade", and ninth on The Hollywood Reporter's "The 10 Best Films of the Decade". It also appeared (unranked) on The New York Times' "The 10 Most Influential Films of the Decade (and 20 Other Favorites)", Wired's "The 24 Absolute Best Movies of the 2010s", and the Los Angeles Times' "The Best Movies of the Decade: Kenneth Turan and Justin Chang's Essential Picks". In Metacritic's tally of lists of the best films of the decade, Fury Road topped more lists than any other film, with 20 critics placing it at number one. In 2025, the film ranked number 11 on The New York Times' list of "The 100 Best Movies of the 21st Century", and number 7 on Rolling Stone's equivalent.

== Franchise ==
=== Spin-off ===
During the writing process for Fury Road in 2011, Miller and McCarthy found that they had enough story material for two additional scripts. Miller told Wired in May 2015 that if the film became successful, he would tell the other two stories. In November 2017, it was reported that a lawsuit filed by Miller's production company against Warner Bros. over a disputed $7 million bonus was likely to delay the production of any further Mad Max films. However, the legal dispute was resolved in 2019 or 2020, enabling pre-production to move forward.

In October 2020, a prequel to Fury Road, titled Furiosa: A Mad Max Saga, entered "advanced development" at Warner Bros, in collaboration with Miller and Mitchel under their Kennedy Miller Mitchell banner. Miller directed the film and co-wrote the screenplay with Nico Lathouris. Anya Taylor-Joy portrayed a young Furiosa, Chris Hemsworth portrayed her nemesis Dementus, and Tom Burke portrayed her mentor Jack; in addition, Jacob Tomuri, Tom Hardy's stuntman in Fury Road, had a cameo appearance as Max Rockatansky, and Josh Helman and Bryan Probets portrayed Scabrous Scrotus and Chumbucket, characters created for the 2015 Mad Max video game (set between Mad Max Beyond Thunderdome and Fury Road). The film was released on 24 May 2024.

=== Possible sequel ===
In March 2015, during an interview with Esquire, Hardy revealed that he was attached to star in three more Mad Max films following Fury Road. In July 2019, Miller told IndieWire that three films were being considered: two Mad Max stories and a Furiosa story, the latter of which was eventually produced first.

In May 2015, Miller revealed that one of these proposed films would be titled Mad Max: The Wasteland, although he clarified that The Wasteland was a working title. The Wasteland is another Fury Road prequel that would trace Max's travels in the Wasteland in the year preceding his capture by Immortan Joe's forces at the start of Fury Road.

Following the release of Furiosa, The Hollywood Reporter clarified that The Wasteland was not yet in development. In June 2024, Hardy, while promoting The Bikeriders, said in an interview that, "I don't think [The Wasteland is] happening."

In February 2025, Miller expressed further interest in making The Wasteland despite Furiosa underperforming, though he wished to commit to other projects first, saying "[The Wasteland] is not something I would do next, because there's two things I'm keen to do next. But if for whatever reason the planets align, you can never tell. Too often, you're lining up to do a movie and then something happens. Some things fall into place and some don't, so all I can say is we'll see.

== Works cited ==
- Martin, Adrian (2003). The Mad Max Movies (Australian Screen Classics). Currency Press. ISBN 978-0-86819-670-1.
