= Immortan Joe =

Antagonist of Mad Max: Fury Road

- Hugh Keays-Byrne as Immortan Joe in Mad Max: Fury Road (2015)
- First appearance: Mad Max: Fury Road (2015)
- Last appearance: Furiosa: A Mad Max Saga (2024)
- Created by: George Miller; Brendan McCarthy; Nico Lathouris
- Portrayed by: Hugh Keays-Byrne (2015); Lachy Hulme (2024)

In-universe information
- Full name: Joe Moore
- Title: Immortan
- Spouses: The Splendid Angharad; Toast the Knowing; Capable; The Dag; Cheedo the Fragile; Other unnamed wives
- Children: Corpus Colossus; Rictus Erectus; Scabrous Scrotus; Angharad's stillborn son; The Dag's unborn child; Unnamed conjoined twins

Colonel Joseph "Joe" Moore, also known as the Immortan Joe, is a fictional character in the Australian post-apocalyptic action film series Mad Max, first appearing as the main antagonist of the 2015 film Mad Max: Fury Road, and also serving as a major character in Fury Road's companion comic book series of the same name and its 2024 prequel Furiosa: A Mad Max Saga. In the radioactive, post-apocalyptic wasteland of the series, Immortan Joe is a powerful warlord; his cult and army of fanatical "War Boys" revere him as a god of Norse mythology, who will lead them to Valhalla. He dominates the regional economy through his control over the Citadel, one of the only remaining sources of fresh water in the wasteland. However, Joe is also incredibly sick due to radiation. His desire to breed a genetically healthy heir to his kingdom leads him to acquire and mistreat a harem of sex slaves, a candidate for whom, Imperator Furiosa, becomes his trusted military lieutenant on taking down the Warlord Dementus in Furiosa, before turning against him to free Joe's remaining slaves from the Citadel, thus triggering the events of Fury Road.

In Fury Road, Immortan Joe was portrayed by Hugh Keays-Byrne, who previously portrayed the Toecutter in the original Mad Max. In Furiosa, Immortan Joe was portrayed by Lachy Hulme as Keays-Byrne died in 2020.

== Character description ==
In Fury Road, Immortan Joe is the "ruler of the wasteland... He wears a clear, plastic carapace — chest armor — over oozing sores, his long, white hair flaring around a skeleton-smile mask he uses to hide a breathing apparatus." Several versions of his carapace, which display medals made from car and mobile phone parts and some actual military insignia (such as the U.S. Navy officer cap insignia), were created at Artisan Armours in the United Kingdom.

The cornerstone of Joe's power is the War Boys, an army of young men who have contracted cancer and other fatal diseases from the radioactivity of the Wasteland. To rally these men to his banner, Joe invents an automobile-centered religion with himself as its head. He encourages the already-dying War Boys to seek a glorious death in battle, promising valiant soldiers a place in Valhalla. He also allows them to live in his rock fortress, the Citadel, while his regular citizens live in squalid tunnels. To quickly move his War Boys across the Wasteland, he maintains a large collection of pre-apocalyptic vehicles, which he calls the "House of Holy Motors"; his mechanics creatively repurpose the vehicles into fighting machines, including the "War Rig," a heavily armed and armoured supply tanker that ferries trade goods through the lawless wasteland.

Although the War Boys obey Joe without question and believe him to be immortal, Joe is slowly dying, and none of his three sons are ideal successors: Rictus Erectus is physically imposing but slow-witted and needs an oxygen tank to breathe; Scabrous Scrotus is deformed and psychologically unstable; and Corpus Colossus, though highly intelligent, is afflicted with Osteogenesis imperfecta. As a result, Joe urgently purchases, kidnaps, and steals genetically healthy women in the hopes of breeding a healthy heir before he dies.

== Fictional biography ==
=== Comic book ===
The comic book tells the origins of Joe's rise to power. Originally Colonel Joe Moore, the man who would become Immortan Joe was a highly celebrated soldier in the Australian Army who in the early 21st century fought in the water and oil wars that helped bring on a global apocalypse. After the collapse of civilization, he and his men deserted their posts and went into the Outback, as most others did. They then became a brutal road gang, with Joe often taking the wives and daughters of rival gang members as his slaves. He also had an unnamed brother, who followed him.

During one of his raids, a fat cannibal about to be executed tells Joe of a massive aquifer, nearly impossible to enter. Despite many casualties, Joe eventually manages to capture the aquifer, which would eventually become the Citadel. His followers acclaim him as "immortal," which is eventually adapted into the honorific "Immortan."

While Joe is attempting to capture the aquifer, he sends out scouts who discover an abandoned oil refinery and a lead mine, which would eventually become Gastown and the Bullet Farm respectively. Joe puts his right-hand-man Major Kalashnikov in charge of the Bullet Farm; Kalashnikov becomes known as the Bullet Farmer. Joe also rewards the man who revealed the location of the Citadel with control of Gastown; that man becomes known as the People Eater. Though now in control of the Citadel, Joe begins to succumb to radiation sickness.

=== Furiosa: A Mad Max Saga ===
Immortan Joe appears in Furiosa, the Fury Road prequel, when the warlord Dementus's Biker Horde lays siege to the Citadel. With the exception of Kalashnikov, his old crew of soldiers have either died or left, leaving Joe with a cult-like army of mostly young men known as the "War Boys", who worship Joe as a divine being who will bring their souls to Valhalla. He has also grown ill from the radioactivity in the wasteland, requiring a breathing apparatus to survive. Although Dementus encourages the War Boys to stage a coup, Joe succinctly demonstrates the foolishness of this plan by ordering a War Boy to commit a suicide bombing in front of Dementus. The War Boys then attack the Biker Horde en masse, driving them from the Citadel. However, Joe is forced to negotiate with Dementus after the latter uses trickery to capture Gastown from Joe's brother, which produces the petrol that Joe uses to pump water from the Citadel's underground aquifer. After Dementus's retinue reveals that his prisoner Furiosa does not have any birth defects, Joe buys Furiosa from Dementus, as well as Dementus's doctor, the Organic Mechanic. He tells the preteen Furiosa that when she comes of age, she may become one of his "wives." Locked in the private vault in which Joe imprisons his wives, Joe's son Rictus carries her out at night, intent on raping her, but she escapes him. Unable to flee the Citadel alone, she joins Joe's army under a false identity and rises up the ranks.

Years later, Joe resolves to attack Gastown, as Dementus's mismanagement has led it to near-ruin. He sends the War Rig to pick up weapons and ammunition from his ally, the Bullet Farmer. However, Dementus ambushes the War Rig, and Furiosa is the only survivor. When Furiosa arrives back at the Citadel, Joe's war council is debating how to respond to black smoke billowing from Gastown. Furiosa, who is familiar with Dementus's style of warfare from her time as his prisoner, recognizes that the smoke is a ruse and that Dementus wants Joe to launch an all-out attack on Gastown so that he can make a sneak attack on the undefended Citadel. Joe agrees with Furiosa. The War Boys fool Dementus into thinking that they are headed for Gastown. Meanwhile, Joe successfully ambushes the unsuspecting Dementus on his way to the Citadel, allowing the War Boys to gain the upper hand in Joe's 40-day war with the Biker Horde. After the War Boys defeat the Horde, Furiosa captures the fleeing Dementus, and Joe promotes her to Imperator.

=== Video game ===
Joe does not directly appear in the game, but the game introduces a band of War Boys led by his son Scabrous Scrotus. In the game, Scrotus is depicted as the third leader of Gastown (after Immortan Joe's brother and Dementus); Joe refused to let Scrotus inherit the Citadel due to the latter's insanity. When Max lodges a chainsaw in Scrotus's head at the beginning of the game, Scrotus becomes hell-bent on taking Max down. He is killed at the end of the game, opening the way for the People Eater (Joe's military strategist in Furiosa) to take over Gastown.

=== Mad Max: Fury Road ===
By Fury Road, Immortan Joe is the wasteland's most powerful warlord, with allies firmly in charge of both Gastown and the Bullet Farm. However, Joe's health has worsened even more, with him requiring servants to even get up. He has no healthy heir and only five remaining wives: Toast "the Knowing", Capable, the Dag, Cheedo "the Fragile", and his favorite, "the Splendid" Angharad. (Furiosa shows that Joe's policy is to discard his wives after three failed attempts at breeding a healthy heir.) Two of these wives – Angharad and the Dag – are pregnant with potential heirs.

At the beginning of the film, Joe dispatches the War Rig (commanded by Imperator Furiosa) on a seemingly routine supply run to Gastown and the Bullet Farm. Although his forces have captured Max Rockatansky, he is unaware of Max's significance. However, when he sees that Furiosa has veered off course, Joe checks his private vault and realizes that the Five Wives have escaped in the War Rig. Enraged and desperate, Joe takes every able-bodied War Boy in the Citadel with him in pursuit. He also commands Gastown and the Bullet Farm to send their own armies to help. In the chaos of the pursuit, Max escapes; with nowhere else to go, he agrees to help Furiosa.

Joe nearly catches the War Rig in a narrow canyon, but each time the War Boys attempt to shoot Furiosa, Angharad climbs to the outside of the War Rig to act as a human shield, knowing that Joe will not risk injuring his unborn baby. During one of these encounters, Angharad trips and falls into the path of Joe's monster truck, which runs her over, killing both Angharad and the fetus. A C-section reveals that the baby was physically perfect, which enrages Joe even further.

Joe stops his army in the desert while he ponders his next move. To his great surprise, he sees that the War Rig has turned around and is heading back to the Citadel, as Furiosa's original destination can no longer support human life. In an ironic echo of the Furiosa film's Gastown ruse, Joe realizes that he has left the Citadel undefended. He nonetheless manages to overtake the War Rig with his personal vehicle, the Gigahorse. However, Furiosa boards the Gigahorse and uses a harpoon to rip off Joe's breathing mask, tearing Joe's jaw apart and killing him. Furiosa's war party commandeers the Gigahorse and ditches the War Rig in the canyon where Angharad died, preventing the rest of Joe's army from pursuing them. Furiosa returns unhindered to the Citadel, where Max presents Joe's corpse to the locals, who celebrate his death. Having lost their "savior", the remaining War Boys reluctantly surrender the Citadel to Furiosa, ending Joe's regime and dynasty for good.

== Reception ==
Writing about the film for ABC News, Michael Rothman described Immortan Joe as "a real bad guy who looks nothing like any villain that's ever graced the silver screen". Vanity Fair's Joanna Robinson described him as "nightmarish" and "a fairly classic Miller creation with a skull fetish even a teenage goth would envy". Spencer Kornhaber of The Atlantic wrote, "Perhaps the closest 2015 has gotten to providing fodder for 'Greatest Villains of All Time' lists was in Mad Max: Fury Road, where slaver-warlord Immortan Joe sported a nauseating headpiece and an equally nauseating dadbod."

== See also ==
- MTV Movie Award for Best Villain
