= Namibian Coast Conservation and Management Project =

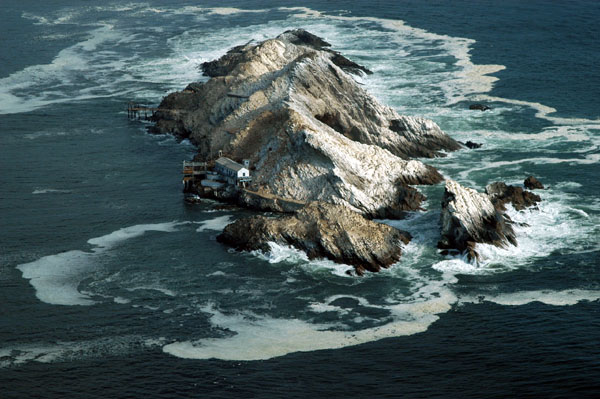
Mercury Island, managed by the Ministry of Fisheries and Marine Resources

The Namibian Coast Conservation and Management Project (NACOMA) is a conservation and wildlife monitoring project operating in Namibia. NACOMA, as it is known, was officially launched in March 2006 as a five-year project co-funded by the Global Environmental Facility (GEF) and the Namibian government with the support of the World Bank.

NACOMA's objectives are to prevent the loss of biodiversity and coastal degradation in Namibia and to promote sustainable development which comply with global environmental demands on a localised and national level.

NACOMA supports scientific monitoring and research along the coast of Namibia including Mercury Island, Ichaboe Island, Halifax Island and Possession Island, islands which support the entire Namibian breeding population of Cape gannets Morus capensis, 96% of the Namibian population of the endangered African penguin Spheniscus demersus, and nearly 90% of the global breeding population of bank cormorants Phalacrocorax neglectus.
