= Max Rockatansky =

Protagonist of the Mad Max films franchise

Max Rockatansky The Road Warrior
- Mad Max character
- Max as portrayed by Mel Gibson (left) and Tom Hardy (right)
- First appearance: Mad Max (1979)
- Created by: George Miller; Byron Kennedy
- Portrayed by: Mel Gibson (1979–1985); Tom Hardy (2015); Jacob Tomuri (2024)
- Voiced by: Bren Foster (video game)

In-universe information
- Aliases: The Road Warrior; Raggedy Man; The Man with No Name; The Guy who keeps Mr.Dead in his Pocket; "Him that came the salvage"
- Nickname: Mad Max
- Species: Human
- Occupation: Former Main Force Police (MFP) Officer; Mercenary-Vigilante; Nomadic Survivalist
- Spouses: Jessie (wife, deceased)
- Children: Sprog (son, deceased)
- Nationality: Australian
- Vehicle: Max's Yellow Interceptor; V8 Interceptor; Holden Sandman HJ Panel Van; Camel Wagon

Max Rockatansky is the title character and antihero protagonist of the Australian post-apocalyptic action film series Mad Max created by director George Miller and producer Byron Kennedy. Max was played by actors Mel Gibson in the first three films from 1979 to 1985, Tom Hardy in the fourth film in 2015, and in a cameo appearance by Jacob Tomuri in the prequel spin-off film Furiosa in 2024. The character is also present in two Mad Max video games.

According to film critic Justin Chang, Miller (a doctor by training) picked Max's last name as an homage to Carl von Rokitansky. The character is ranked as popular on various lists and has inspired characters in other films.

== Films ==
=== Mad Max ===
In Mad Max, Max Rockatansky is a Main Force Patrol (MFP) highway patrolman tasked with maintaining law and order on the roads of a dystopian Victoria, Australia. Max is quiet, rarely speaking to any great extent, and never paying much attention to his steadily increasing reputation. He and his wife, Jessie, have an infant son, referred to only as "Sprog" (slang for "child") in the film. He is played by actor Mel Gibson.

Though the best officer on the force, he is secretly afraid that he is becoming as cold and heartless as the criminals he pursues. He reaches a breaking point when a gang of criminally insane bikers led by the "Toecutter" burn Max's partner Goose alive inside a borrowed ute. The sight of Goose's charred body in a hospital bed prompts Max to resign from the MFP. However, he is convinced by his commanding officer to take a vacation before committing to his decision. The MFP's officers are increasingly infuriated with the Australian prosecutors' inability to convict the criminals that they arrest, and Max's commanding officer gives him license to do as he pleases with the biker gang.

Max goes on holiday with his family, but runs across Toecutter's gang, which kills Sprog and injures Jessie, leaving her in a coma; she later dies. Overwhelmed with grief and rage, he takes the MFP's Pursuit Special ("the last of the V8 Interceptors") and systematically pursues and kills each gang member responsible. Max is injured in an ambush set for him by the Toecutter, where he is shot in the left leg and has his right arm run over at the elbow. Despite his injuries, he manages to fatally shoot gang lieutenant Bubba Zanetti and pursues the Toecutter to his death. After hunting down final gang member Johnny the Boy and leaving him in a death trap, Max drives out into the wasteland, leaving the fading remnants of civilization behind him.

=== Mad Max 2: The Road Warrior ===
In Mad Max 2, set about three years after the first film, Max wanders the wasteland of the outback in his battle-scarred Pursuit Special. The character is again played by Mel Gibson. He runs out of petrol and seeks refuge with a human settlement manning a remote oil drilling station and refinery, which is besieged by Lord Humungus and his horde of marauding bikers. Initially acting out of self-interest, Max agrees to help the settlers in exchange for petrol, although ironically, Humungus destroys the Pursuit Special shortly after Max refuels it. However, Max develops a mutual respect for the settlers and bonds with an innocent child, who helps him partially rediscover his humanity. In a fierce road battle, he helps the settlers escape to the Sunshine Coast. However, the mentally scarred Max still cannot form any significant bonds with others. At the end of the film, he leaves the survivors, choosing to continue wandering the wasteland alone. The narrator (the child Max bonds with) notes that he never saw Max again.

=== Mad Max Beyond Thunderdome ===
In Mad Max 3, set fifteen years after the second film, Max is still wandering through the wasteland, scavenging whatever he needs for survival. This is Max's final appearance played by actor Mel Gibson. His hair has grown long, and very few remnants of his old police uniform remain recognizable. After robbers steal Max's camels and possessions, Max visits the settlement of Bartertown to reclaim his belongings. He falls afoul of Aunty Entity, Bartertown's dictator, and is exiled into the desert, where he is rescued by a tribe of children living in a wilderness oasis. Max initially tries to leave the children, who mistakenly see him as a quasi-religious savior. However, he eventually agrees to help the children escape to the ruins of Sydney with one of the last remaining planes in the wasteland. In a climactic desert battle, he sacrifices his own seat on the plane to ensure that the children can take off safely. After arriving in Sydney, the children use pre-apocalyptic technology to begin rebuilding civilization, but Max is once again stranded in the wasteland. In this movie, Max arguably comes full circle, regaining his humanity and sacrificing his own well-being for the sake of others. The narrator (one of the children Max saves) explains that every night, she leaves a light in a skyscraper so that Max, if he so chooses, can find his way to Sydney.

=== Mad Max: Fury Road ===
Sometime after Mad Max Beyond Thunderdome, the opening to Fury Road finds Max - played by Tom Hardy in this film - haggard and alone with his car. After his Interceptor is wrecked and he is captured by a gang known as the "War Boys", he is imprisoned and used as a live blood donor for the gang. Strapped to the bonnet of a car in pursuit of the War Boys' renegade general, Imperator Furiosa, Max escapes and reluctantly helps Furiosa in her quest to help five women escape from the War Boys' despotic leader, Immortan Joe. After the group defeat their pursuers, Max parts ways with the survivors of the group and disappears.

=== Furiosa: A Mad Max Saga ===
Max makes a cameo appearance in the prequel film Furiosa: A Mad Max Saga, he watches from a distance as an injured Praetorian Furiosa struggles to walk back to the Citadel. He is played by Tom Hardy's Fury Road stuntman, Jacob Tomuri.

== Games ==
=== Mad Max (1990) ===
The first video game to feature the character was released in 1990 for the Nintendo Entertainment System. The game's plot is loosely based on Mad Max 2.

=== Mad Max (2015) ===
Max, voiced by Bren Foster, is robbed by war boys loyal to Scabrous Scrotus, the lord of Gastown, and abandoned in the wasteland. He meets a zealous hunchbacked mechanic called Chumbucket, who has plans to build an ultimate war vehicle called the Magnum Opus. They form an alliance to gather parts and build out the vehicle so that Max can reach Gastown, get a new V8 Interceptor and continue to the Plains of Silence. As he allies with different strongholds and battles the raider gangs, he encounters a mysterious figure called Griffa who reminds him of his humanity. Max defeats Scrotus and recovers his vehicle, then continues his journey and leaves behind a transformed wasteland.

== Equipment ==
During the first two films, Max makes use of a Pursuit Special, though he drives a different vehicle (an MFP Interceptor) earlier in the first film. Between the second and third films, after the destruction of the Pursuit Special, Max acquires a roll-cage equipped vehicle based on a pick-up truck and set up to be used as a camel-drawn wagon at need. This is later stolen from him. He later steals it back after it has been modified to run on methane and uses it during the final chase sequence.

He wears the black MFP issue uniform of heavy duty riding leathers, which become ripped and patched through the course of the series. During his time with Main Force Patrol, he is armed with a revolver which he does not use, favoring a sawn-off shotgun which he uses in the second and third films. In the third film, he uses a more traditional shotgun, and, after accumulating even more weapons, surrenders them all in Bartertown, which The Scotsman calls a moment of self-parody.

== Abilities ==
Max possesses considerable skill with firearms and is an excellent shot, but his most apparent skill is combative driving: he can shoot accurately with one hand while driving with the other. At the time of Mad Max, he was considered the "top pursuit man" in the MFP. He can easily pursue or evade gangs in the wasteland, whether overrunning another vehicle at high speed or ramming vehicles off the road. This skill is apparent with trucks as well as automobiles, as he drives a semi truck after sustaining serious injuries in the second film.

Max displays fast reflexes in Mad Max 2: The Road Warrior by grabbing a snake before it can bite him and in Mad Max: Fury Road stomping a two-headed lizard that runs towards him from behind. This leads Aunty Entity to choose him to kill Master Blaster in Mad Max Beyond Thunderdome, as he was the first to survive her "audition." Max also displays a fair amount of mechanical and electronics ability, performing minor repairs on his own vehicle and rigging two to explode should someone tamper with them or his fuel tanks. He also improvised a time delay fuse with only a cigarette lighter, a lamp housing and the leaking fuel of an overturned vehicle.

Max is primarily a survivalist in the wasteland and can tolerate discomfort and pain in achieving a goal, but unlike many movie protagonists, Max is susceptible to realistic and sometimes permanent injury: his left knee is blown out by a gunshot towards the end of the first film, he walks with a slight limp with the help of a leg brace in the second film, and the knee is still tightly bandaged in the third film. In Fury Road, Max's left knee brace makes another appearance and still appears to affect his mobility, albeit only slightly. An injury to his left eye as a result of the crash of the Pursuit Special in Mad Max 2: The Road Warrior is evident years later in Mad Max Beyond Thunderdome.

== Development ==
According to film critic Justin Chang, Miller (a doctor by training) picked Max's last name as an homage to Carl von Rokitansky, a pathologist "who pioneered a method of examining organs at autopsies to determine the cause of death."

== Reception ==
Entertainment Weekly ranked the character eleventh on its list of the top twenty "All-Time Coolest Heroes in Pop Culture" in April 2009. The magazine also listed the characters portrayed by Kevin Costner in Waterworld and The Postman as "copycat descendants" of Max Rockatansky. Total Film ranked him #75 in their Top 100 Movie Characters of All Time.
