= Imperator Furiosa =

- Mad Max character
- Charlize Theron as Imperator Furiosa in Mad Max: Fury Road
- First appearance: Mad Max: Fury Road (2015)
- Created by: George Miller; Brendan McCarthy; Nico Lathouris
- Portrayed by: Charlize Theron (2015); Anya Taylor-Joy (2024); Alyla Browne (2024)

In-universe information
- Full name: Furiosa
- Titles: Imperator; Praetorian (formerly)
- Occupation: Soldier; Driver; Mechanic; Survivalist
- Affiliation: Vuvalini of Many Mothers; Immortan Joe (formerly); Max Rockatansky; Nux
- Family: Mary Jabassa (mother, deceased)
- Significant others: Praetorian Jack (lover, deceased)
- Vehicle: The War Rig

Imperator Furiosa is a fictional character in the Australian post-apocalyptic action film series Mad Max. Introduced in Mad Max: Fury Road (2015) and portrayed by Charlize Theron, she serves as an officer in Immortan Joe's army but turns against him in order to free "The Five Wives", Joe's "breeders". During her journey, she meets Max Rockatansky. After initial hostility, the two become allies in driving The Five Wives to a safe environment called the "Green Place".

The character returned in the prequel film Furiosa: A Mad Max Saga (2024), with Anya Taylor-Joy portraying her as an adult and Alyla Browne portraying her as a child. In the film, the warlord Dementus kidnaps Furiosa and executes her mother before selling her to Immortan Joe as a future breeder. Furiosa escapes and adopts a new identity as a mechanic, and later, soldier. At the end of the film, she avenges her mother by defeating and capturing Dementus, and is promoted to Imperator.

== Films ==
=== Furiosa: A Mad Max Saga ===
Furiosa was born in the "Green Place of Many Mothers", an oasis and remnant of the Australian bush and one of the few locations in the post-apocalyptic wasteland of the Mad Max franchise where plants still grow. She was raised by her mother Mary Jabassa, a member of a matriarchal survivor civilization called the Vuvalini of Many Mothers. Like the rest of the Vuvalini at the time, Furiosa lived off the land and was always barefoot.

45 years after "the collapse", Furiosa was first seen picking peaches with her friend Valkyrie when they see the Roobillies allied with the warlord Dementus, who leads the Biker Horde. Furiosa advises Valkyrie to be invisible. She gets captured trying to sabotage their bikes, but blows her whistle to alert the Vuvalini. Although Mary pursues the kidnappers to Dementus's camp and rescues Furiosa, the Horde catches them and executes Mary in front of Furiosa. Before dying, Mary makes Furiosa promise to find her way home.

Dementus keeps Furiosa as a captive. Having lost his family (including his own child) during the apocalypse, he hopes to raise Furiosa as his new daughter, nicknaming her "Little D" and taking her (in a cage) with him wherever he goes. However, Furiosa refuses to forgive Dementus and vows revenge. During her captivity, Furiosa secrely tattoos a star map on her left arm which she learned from the History Man.

By the time Dementus learned about the Citadel, Furiosa's hair had grown out. When Dementus wanted to claim the Citadel, Immortan Joe unleashed his warriors on them. Furiosa was nearly dragged into one of the tunnels and was saved by Dementus who led the retreat. Some days later, Furiosa was present when Dementus had come up with a Trojan Horse-type plan to take Gas Town.

During a peace conference with Immortan Joe, a neighboring warlord, Dementus proudly introduces a redressed Furiosa to Joe as his daughter. Furiosa reprimands Dementus in front of Joe, explaining that Dementus kidnapped her and killed her mother. Humiliated, Dementus trades Furiosa to Joe for economic concessions while also giving Joe his servant known as the Organic Mechanic.

Immortan Joe brings Furiosa to his fortress, the Citadel, where he imprisons her in a luxurious residence for his "wives", a group of sex slaves who have mostly avoided the genetic effects of post-apocalyptic radiation. He aims to use the "wives" to breed a healthy heir, as all of his sons were born with birth defects. Furiosa witnesses a woman fail a third time to produce a healthy heir by giving birth to a baby with a conjoined body as the Organic Mechanic tells the woman that she'll still be of use to Joe as a milker as Joe's son Rictus moves his hand through Furiosa's hair. Later that night, Furiosa works on a wig using her own hair as a precaution. When Rictus unlocks Furiosa's prison to sexually assault her, she escapes the residence, hides on a cliffside, and begins a new life, spending the next ten years under a new identity as a nonverbal, male-passing mechanic for Joe's private army called the War Boys. She started wearing full clothing while sporting bandaged feet.

As a mechanic years later, Furiosa helps build the "War Rig", a heavily armed and armoured tractor-trailer that transports water, human milk, and agricultural products from the Citadel to trade for petrol and ammunition produced by Joe's military allies. During one of Furiosa's attempts to escape the Citadel, her potential impresses the War Rig's commander, Praetorian Jack, who convinces her that she will need substantially more training and supplies to escape the Citadel properly. Jack agrees to mentor Furiosa and trains her to become a capable driver and soldier. She becomes Jack's right-hand woman and is promoted to Praetorian herself.

At the end of Furiosa's training, Furiosa and Jack resolve to run away together. However, before they can escape, Dementus declares war on Immortan Joe. He ambushes the War Rig during a supply run and captures Furiosa and Jack. While trying to escape the ambush, Furiosa nearly loses her left arm when it is smashed against the wheel of Dementus's monster truck. An enraged Dementus forces Furiosa to watch Jack's execution, fifteen years after forcing her to watch her mother's execution. He adds insult to injury by hanging her from his truck by her injured left arm. However, his sadism backfires when Furiosa severs her left arm to escape, losing her star map but saving her life.

Upon returning to the Citadel where she collapsed, the Corpse Minder tends to her injuries and cleans her up. After crawling barefoot out of the Corpse Minder's tunnel, Furiosa informs Joe and his followers about Dementus' plan as they make conflicting plans to deal with him and the Biker Horde.

In order to combat Dementus, she builds a mechanical prosthetic arm, shaves her head, and pursues Dementus through the desert until she catches up with him, drains his last bit of water and taunts him. She captures Dementus and drags him away. While the History Man has heard varying theories on what Furiosa did to Dementus, he narrates that Furiosa actually imprisoned her old captor in the Citadel, 15 years after she was first kidnapped. She has used Dementus to plant a peach tree that now grows from his slowly dying body. When Furiosa picks one of those peaches, Dementus gives her a proud smile and then she heads to where Immortan Joe's wives are kept.

=== Mad Max: Fury Road ===
At least four years pass between the fall of Dementus and the events of Mad Max: Fury Road. (Note: The Mad Max films have "no strict chronology", but in Fury Road, Furiosa mentions that she was kidnapped roughly 7,000 days, or 19 years, before the events of the film, plus the days she "doesn't remember".) Sometime after Furiosa captures Dementus, Immortan Joe promotes her to Imperator and gives her command of a new War Rig.

The canon comic book prequel story, co-written by George Miller, examines Furiosa's deteriorating relationship with Joe in the years between Furiosa and Fury Road where he put her in charge of his remaining wives for a brief time. When she was removed from this position, Furiosa told the remaining wives about her history and the Green Place.

At the start of the film, Joe dispatches Furiosa and the War Rig on a supply run to Gastown (an oil refinery) and the Bullet Farm (a mining facility that manufactures guns and ammunition). Unbeknownst to him the night before, Furiosa helped Joe's five remaining "wives" stow away in the War Rig. (Note: As seen at the end of Furiosa: A Mad Max Saga.) In a subsequent conversation with Max Rockatansky, Furiosa implies that she has committed many crimes during her years working for Joe, and tells Max that she agreed to help the Five Wives escape as a way of seeking redemption.

After leaving the Citadel, Furiosa abruptly changes course and heads off the main road in search of the Green Place, precipitating a battle in which she shows her combat and tactical skills. Having lost her star map during the events of Furiosa, Furiosa no longer knows the exact way home, and proceeds based on memory. She successfully defends the Rig from bandits and later from a party of War Boys sent out to stop her. She encounters Max Rockatansky in the desert and the two end up working together, drawing on their respective experiences surviving in hostile environments to overcome the challenge of fighting against Joe's forces.

Eventually, Furiosa comes across a Vuvalini watchtower. She identifies herself to the watchwoman, who is revealed to be Valkyrie. Valkyrie calls the remaining Vuvalini to meet Furiosa as they identify her as one of their own and learned how long she was gone. However, they also explain that the Green Place is no longer habitable. In the twenty-odd years since Furiosa was kidnapped, its supply of fresh water disappeared and the soil decayed into a poisonous swamp. Furiosa is devastated to learn that she actually passed through the Green Place the night before, but did not recognize it. She just takes some steps, removes her prosthetic arm, and screams in sorrow.

The Vuvalini decide to trek across the salt flats to find a new home, and Furiosa initially opts to join them. However, Max persuades her and the Vuvalini to return to the Citadel, the only confirmed source of fresh water in the wasteland. Max reasons that because Joe has committed the bulk of his army (and his allies' armies) to pursue Furiosa in the desert, the Citadel must be undefended; as such, if Furiosa can get past Joe's army, she will be able to conquer the Citadel. He persuades Furiosa that building a new civilization with the Citadel's resources is her best chance at finding redemption.

Capitalizing on this opportunity, Furiosa re-assumes command of the War Rig and leads the rag-tag group of rebels back to the Citadel, in the process engaging in a running battle with several groups of vehicles driven by the War Boys. Ultimately, Furiosa is able to board Joe's vehicle and slay the dictator. Upon returning to the Citadel in Joe's vehicle, she displays Joe's corpse to the crowd, earning the crowd's admiration. She is last seen ascending into the cliffside Citadel on a lift used to move vehicles up and down the fortress. Furiosa and Max later glimpse each other one more time before Max disappears into the crowd.

== Equipment ==
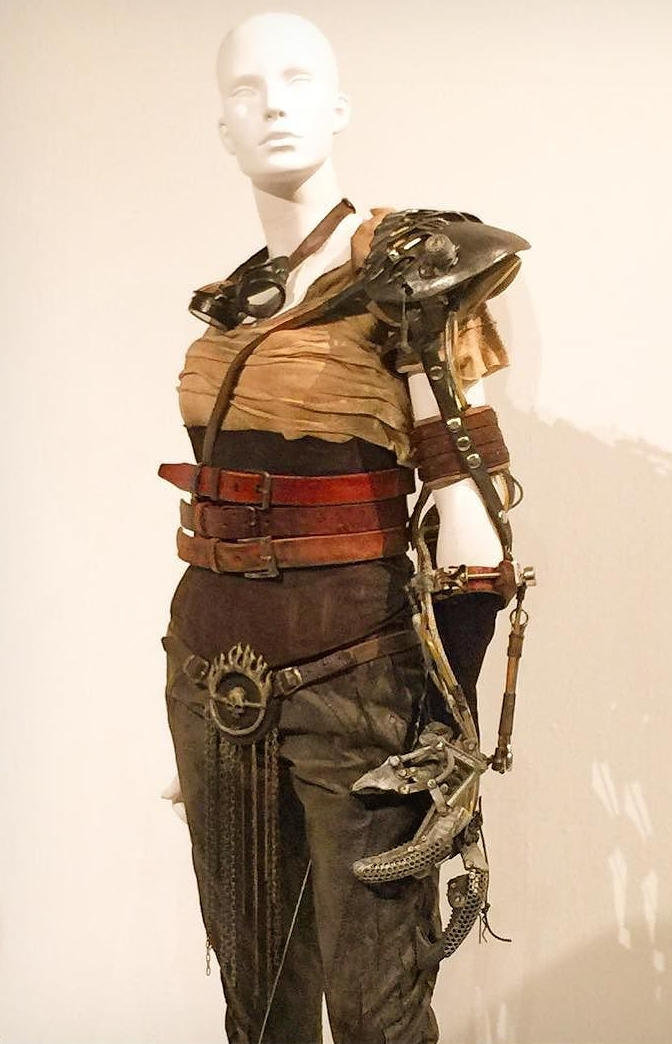
The costume of Imperator Furiosa used in Mad Max: Fury Road

Furiosa is a highly skilled marksman, hand-to-hand fighter, driver, and mechanic. In both Furiosa and Fury Road, Furiosa drives the War Rig, a fast and heavily armed tractor-trailer which she helped design and build as a teenager.

In the prequel, Furiosa primarily uses pistols, although Praetorian Jack later gives her a sawn-off shotgun, which she uses to save Jack's life when Dementus ambushes the War Rig near the end of the film. She also uses a sniper rifle to shoot Dementus's lieutenants at long range during the final chase. In addition, due to her familiarity with the War Rig, she is able to use many of the War Rig's weapons, including its harpoon and mechanical flail. In addition, after losing her forearm following Dementus's ambush, Furiosa builds herself a mechanical left arm mounted on the stump of her forearm.

In Fury Road, Furiosa uses an SKS carbine as her primary weapon, but stores additional weapons, including a secret knife and several pistols, in the War Rig. She also uses Max's sniper rifle to blind the Bullet Farmer, after Max missed several shots.

== Personality ==
Furiosa is a strong-willed and moral leader. In Furiosa, she repeatedly risks her own life to save others. When she sees Dementus's raiders in the Green Place, instead of running back home, she sneaks towards the raiders to try to disable their bikes. Twice, she refuses to heed her allies' pleas to leave them and save herself: first, when her mother makes a last stand against Dementus's horde in a narrow canyon, and second, when Jack attempts to distract Dementus' horde by driving into the Bullet Farm. In Fury Road, she takes the initiative to save the Five Wives from Immortan Joe with little regard for her own well-being and without any desire for reward, save for personal redemption for offscreen misdeeds. She aims to take the Wives to the Green Place, but is devastated to learn that it is now an uninhabitable swamp.

Her relationship with Max inspires her to return to the Citadel and take it over after killing Immortan Joe, giving the Five Wives and all citizens a safe haven. In an interview, Charlize Theron revealed that Furiosa was originally supposed to be another one of Immortan Joe's wives, but was infertile: "[George Miller and I] talked about backstory, about how she ended up with no arm and that she was discarded. She couldn't breed, and that was all that she was good for. She was stolen from this place, this green place that she's trying to go back to. But she was kind of embedded in [the Citadel] for one thing, and when she couldn't deliver on that one thing, she was discarded – and she didn't die. And instead... she hid out with those war pups in the world of mechanics, and they almost forgot she was a woman because she grew up like them." (Furiosa confirms that Joe purchased Furiosa for his breeding program and that he discards his wives after three failed attempts at breeding a healthy heir. However, it does not discuss the infertility plotline, instead suggesting that Furiosa fled on her own.)

Brent Walter Cline argues that an aspect of Furiosa's personality or characterization that is overlooked but just as important as her feminism is her disability: "That Furiosa should be the one to kill Immortan Joe is appropriate, given Miller's desire for a 'feminist action movie.' It's also appropriate, however, given what the film tells us about disability. The very manner of Immortan Joe's death is telling. Furiosa hooks her metal arm to his breathing mask, and then rids herself voluntarily of her prosthesis, tearing away not only Immortan Joe's mask but his face as well. For him, these things cannot be separated. Furiosa will reveal her impairment, but Immortan Joe can never, and its removal is both the metaphorical and literal end of his reign."

== Reception ==
Furiosa's character received critical acclaim. Furiosa has received praise for being a strong female action heroine and bringing feminist themes to the franchise. A. O. Scott and Manohla Dargis of The New York Times said that "Mad Max, which has garnered almost $150 million domestically so far, and near unanimous critical rapture, belongs less to its titular hero than to Imperator Furiosa, the steely avenger played by Charlize Theron. Her mission is to liberate the enslaved 'wives' of the arch-villain, and she receives crucial assistance from a band of gray-haired motorcycle matriarchs."

Richard Roeper wrote for Chicago Sun Times that "Max often takes a passenger seat to Theron's Imperator Furiosa, this is one female-empowered action vehicle." Marc Savlov of The Austin Chronicle wrote that "Furiosa, who more than lives up to her name, is Fury Road's heart and soul – well, after all those nightmarishly souped-up deathmobiles – and this future über-feminist/humanist gets all of the good lines."

Ty Burr of The Boston Globe proclaimed, "About a half hour into Mad Max: Fury Road, you may realize with a start that Max is sharing hero duties with a fiery woman warrior named Furiosa, played with tensile strength by Charlize Theron, and that Furiosa may actually be the central figure in this breakneck and emotionally resonant film. Utterly capable while yearning for 'the green place' from which she was kidnapped as a child, outfitted with a spidery mechanical arm that is one of Miller's many nods to that classic movie dystopia Metropolis, Furiosa is the movie's soul and spine."

Peter Travers of Rolling Stone said, "Hardy and Theron make a dynamite team, but this is Theron's show. She's a knockout in a sensational performance that blends grit and gravity and becomes the film's bruised heart and soul." Lawrence Toppman of The Charlotte Observer agreed, saying that "Theron stands out" in her role.

Claudia Puig of USA Today declared that Theron as Furiosa was "[t]he best female action hero since Sigourney Weaver in Alien", and added that the actress "is riveting as the clever and determined, shaved-headed Furiosa. She lends the role a fascinating blend of toughness, tenderness and gravitas as we learn her tragic back story in the film's final third."
