= Byron Kennedy =

Australian film producer (1949–1983)

- Born: Byron Eric Kennedy; 18 August 1949; Melbourne, Victoria, Australia
- Died: 17 July 1983 (aged 33); Warragamba Dam, New South Wales, Australia
- Occupations: Film producer, cinematographer
- Known for: Co-creator of Mad Max (with George Miller)

Byron Eric Kennedy (18 August 1949 – 17 July 1983) was an Australian film producer known for co-creating the Mad Max series of films with George Miller.

== Early life ==
Byron Kennedy was born in Melbourne. At the age of 18, he formed his own production company named Warlok Films and produced many amateur short films under this logo. In 1970, at the age of 21, he won The Kodak Trophy, Australia's Ten Best on Eight, for the short film Hobson's Bay, a short documentary film about the Melbourne port suburb of Williamstown. A grant from the Australian Film and Television School enabled him to travel overseas and gain invaluable knowledge of the international film/television industry. Upon his return, he embarked upon a television and film course at the University of New South Wales.

== George Miller ==
Kennedy met George Miller at the University of Melbourne in 1969. The first mini-film made by both was Violence in the Cinema, filmed in Yarraville, Melbourne. The film won international acclaim and this led to the formation of the new film company Kennedy Miller, which was incorporated in 1975 with both George Miller and Byron Kennedy as co-directors.

Their first major movie together was the international smash hit Mad Max (1979). This film set a record for the highest-grossing film relative to budget, a record which was only broken with the advent of The Blair Witch Project (1999).

In 1981, Kennedy produced the film Mad Max 2: The Road Warrior, the sequel to Mad Max, which grossed over US$100 million worldwide.

== Death ==
In 1983, at the age of 33, Kennedy was killed at Warragamba Dam in New South Wales, Australia, when the helicopter he was piloting crashed. Family friend Victor Evatt, aged 15, survived the crash and was rescued the next day after spending the night in the cold waters of the dam.

== Legacy ==
In his honour, the Australian Film Institute, with George Miller as a panel member, established the Byron Kennedy Award. This award is bestowed upon those whose work is marked by their pursuit of excellence within the film and television industry and is sponsored by Kennedy Miller, Warner Bros., Village Roadshow, Greater Union, Cinemedia, and Steven Spielberg.

The film Mad Max Beyond Thunderdome is dedicated to Kennedy.

His original co-production company, Kennedy Miller, is now called Kennedy Miller Mitchell.

== Filmography ==
=== Motion pictures ===
- Violence in the Cinema, Part 1 (1971)
- The Last of the Knucklemen (1977)
- Mad Max (1979)
- Mad Max 2 (1981)

=== Miniseries ===
- The Dismissal (1983), a miniseries produced for Network 10 Australia
- Bodyline (1984), a miniseries produced for Network 10 Australia
- The Cowra Breakout (1985), a miniseries produced for Network 10 Australia
