= Interstate 4 =

Interstate Highway in Florida, US

Interstate 4
- I-4 highlighted in red

Route information
- Maintained by FDOT
- Length: 132.30 mi (212.92 km)
- Existed: August 14, 1957–present
- NHS: Entire route

Major junctions
- West end: I-275 in Tampa
- SR 618 in Tampa; I-75 in Mango; SR 570 beltway in Lakeland; US 98 in Lakeland; US 27 near Four Corners; SR 528 near Doctor Phillips; Florida's Turnpike in Orlando; US 17 / US 92 / US 441 in Orlando; SR 408 in Orlando; SR 417 / SR 429 beltway in Sanford
- East end: I-95 / SR 400 near Daytona Beach

Location
- Country: United States
- State: Florida
- Counties: Hillsborough, Polk, Osceola, Orange, Seminole, Volusia

Highway system
- Interstate Highway System; Main; Auxiliary; Suffixed; Business; Future; Florida State Highway System; Interstate; US; State; Former; Pre‑1945; Toll; Scenic
← SR 3	→ SR 4
← SR 399	SR 400	→ SR 401

Interstate 4 (I-4) is an Interstate Highway located entirely within the US state of Florida, maintained by the Florida Department of Transportation (FDOT). Spanning 132.30 miles (212.92 km) along a generally southwest–northeast axis, I-4 is entirely concurrent with State Road 400 (SR 400). In the west, I-4 begins at an interchange with I-275 in Tampa. I-4 intersects with several major expressways as it traverses Central Florida, including US Highway 41 (US 41) in Tampa; US 301 near Riverview; I-75 near Brandon; US 98 in Lakeland; US 27 in unincorporated Davenport; US 192 in Celebration; Florida's Turnpike in Orlando; and US 17 and US 92 in multiple junctions. In the east, I-4 ends at an interchange with I-95 near Daytona Beach, while SR 400 continues for roughly another four miles (6.4 km) and ends at an intersection with US 1 on the city line of Daytona Beach and South Daytona.

Construction on I-4 began in 1958; the first segment opened in 1959, and the entire highway was completed in 1965. The "I-4 Ultimate" project oversaw the construction of variable-toll express lanes and numerous redevelopments through the 21-mile (34 km) stretch of highway extending from Kirkman Road (SR 435; exit 75) in Orlando to SR 434 (exit 94) in Longwood. The project broke ground in 2015, and the express lanes opened to traffic on February 26, 2022. Previously, the median of I-4 between Tampa and Orlando was the planned route of a now-canceled high-speed rail line; however, Brightline, an inter-city rail route, is undergoing planning and design to use the I-4 right-of-way for their expansion of service to Tampa, with an estimated opening in the late 2030s. From a political standpoint, the "I-4 corridor" is a strategic region given the large number of undecided voters in what has long been considered a swing state.

== Route description ==
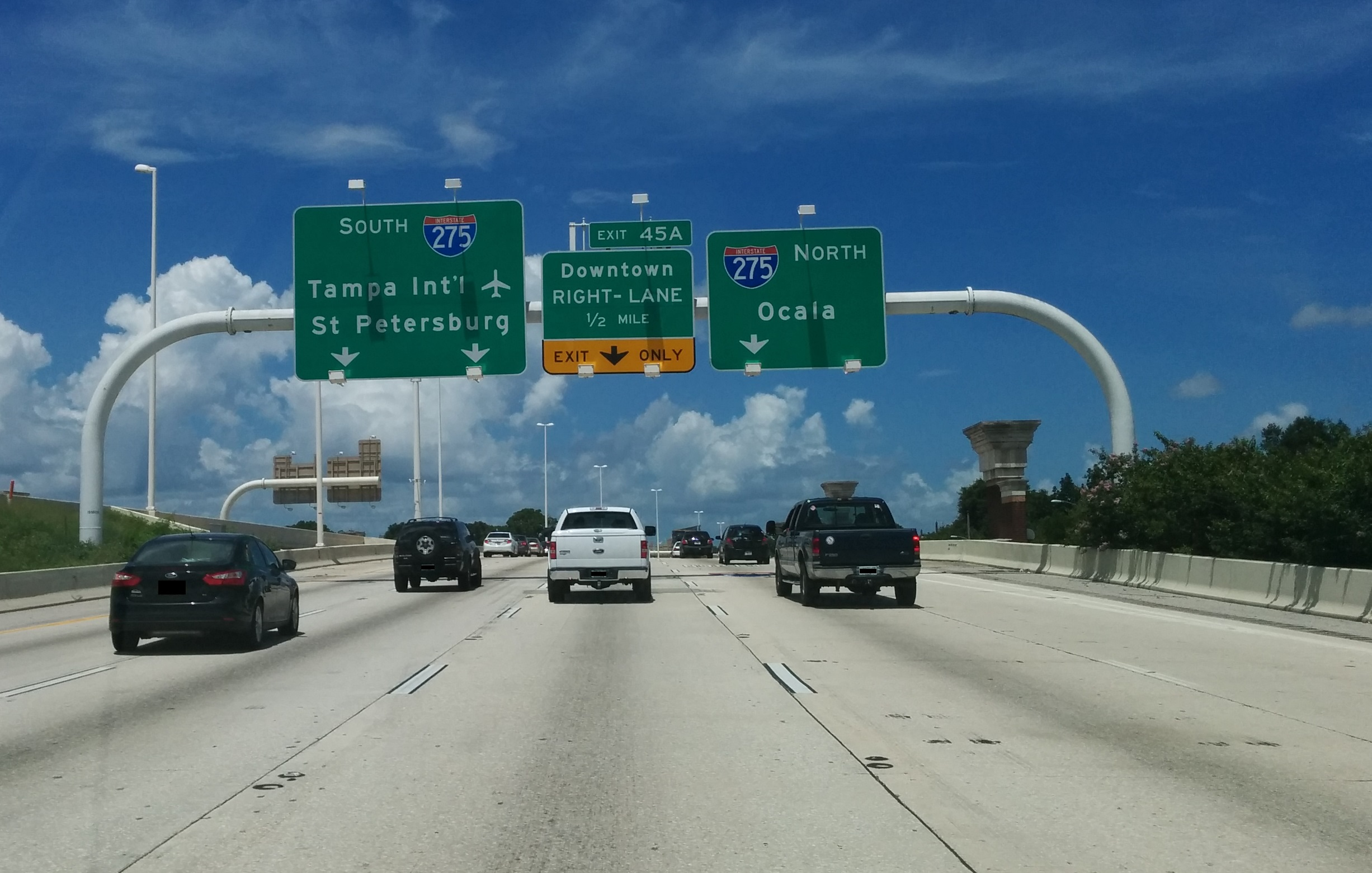
Approaching Malfunction Junction on westbound I-4

I-4 maintains a diagonal, northeast–southwest route for much of its length, although it is signed east–west. I-4 is a minimum of 6 lanes throughout its entire route. It roughly follows the original path of the South Florida Railroad built by Henry B. Plant in 1884.

The highway starts its eastward journey at an interchange with I-275—known as "Malfunction Junction"—near Downtown Tampa and is the starting point for milemarkers and exit numbers (which are mileage-based). Just east of Malfunction Junction, I-4 passes along the north side of Tampa's Ybor City district, where a mile-long (1.6 km) connector links to the Lee Roy Selmon Expressway (SR 618) and Port Tampa Bay. I-4 continues east past the Florida State Fairgrounds toward a turbine interchange (uncommon in the US) with I-75.

Eastbound I-4 at US 27 the afternoon before the arrival of Hurricane Irma on the Gulf Coast with emergency shoulder use to improve traffic capacity

After passing near the eastern suburbs of Hillsborough County—including Brandon and Plant City—it enters Polk County, where I-4 crosses along the north side of Lakeland. The Polk Parkway (SR 570) forms a semi-loop through Lakeland's southern suburbs and returns to I-4 at the Florida Polytechnic University campus, near Polk City. Just after the western junction with the Polk Parkway, I-4 turns from an eastward to a northeastward heading. Between SR 33 (at exit 38) and US 27, I-4 passes through the fog-prone Green Swamp, although the landscape beside the highway is mostly forest as opposed to water-logged swampland. This stretch of road of rural interstate is monitored with variable-message signs, cameras, and vehicle detection systems as a result of several large, deadly pileups caused by dense fog.

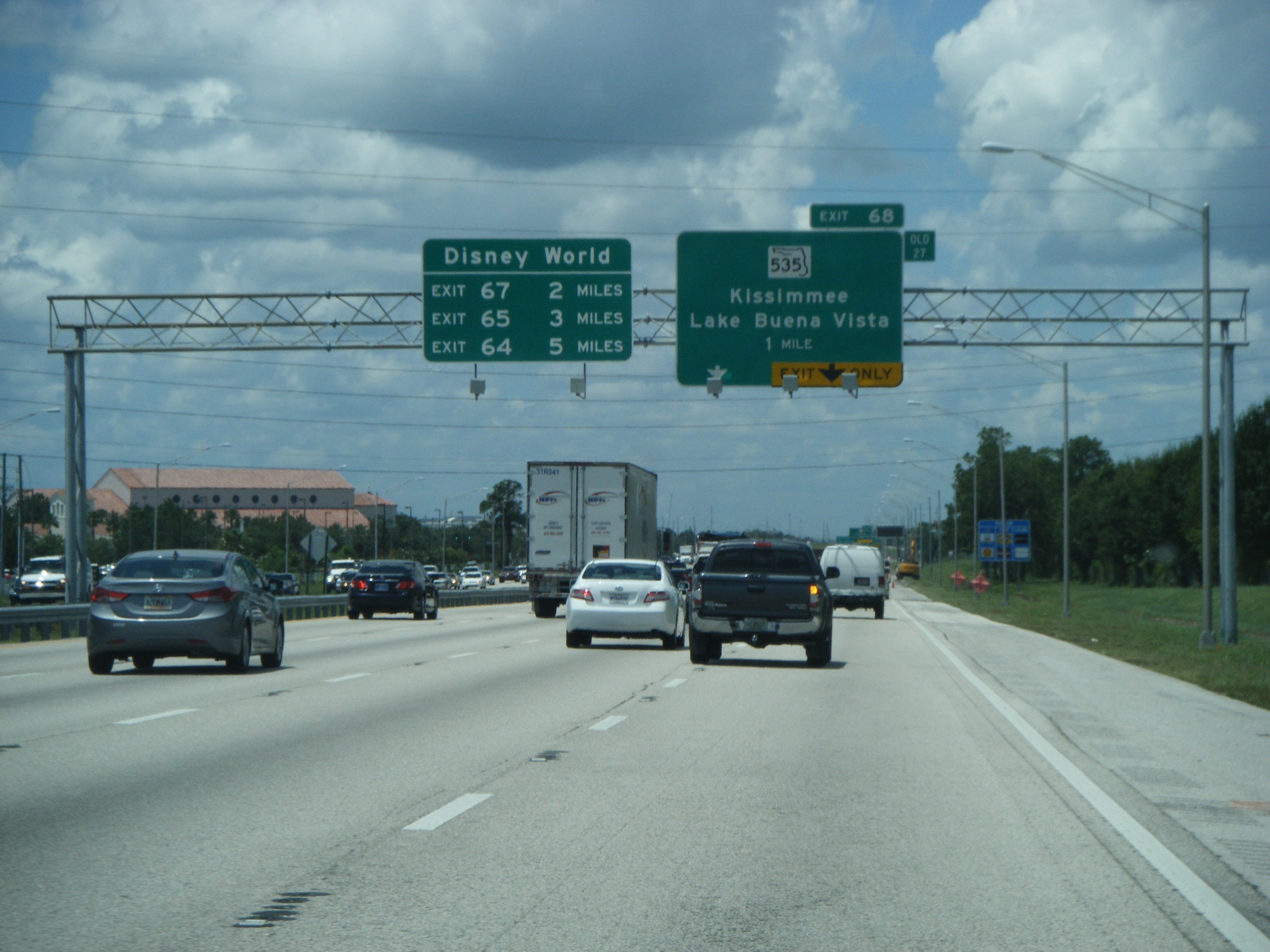
I-4 westbound approaching SR 535 in Lake Buena Vista

At mile 57, I-4 enters Osceola County and, soon thereafter, intersects Greater Orlando's beltways: the Western Expressway (SR 429) on the western side and the Central Florida GreeneWay (SR 417) which rounds the eastern side before returning to I-4 in Sanford. Additionally, an exit to World Drive (signed as just "Disney World") runs north as a limited-access highway into Walt Disney World and an electric pylon in the shape of Mickey Mouse can be seen on the southwest corner of the intersection. The single Central Florida GreeneWay/World Drive exit (exit 62) also marks an abrupt change from rural to suburban/urban landscape. The highway passes beside Celebration and Kissimmee on the east side and Walt Disney World (not visible) on the west side. It enters Orange County, passes through Walt Disney World and by SeaWorld Orlando and Universal Orlando

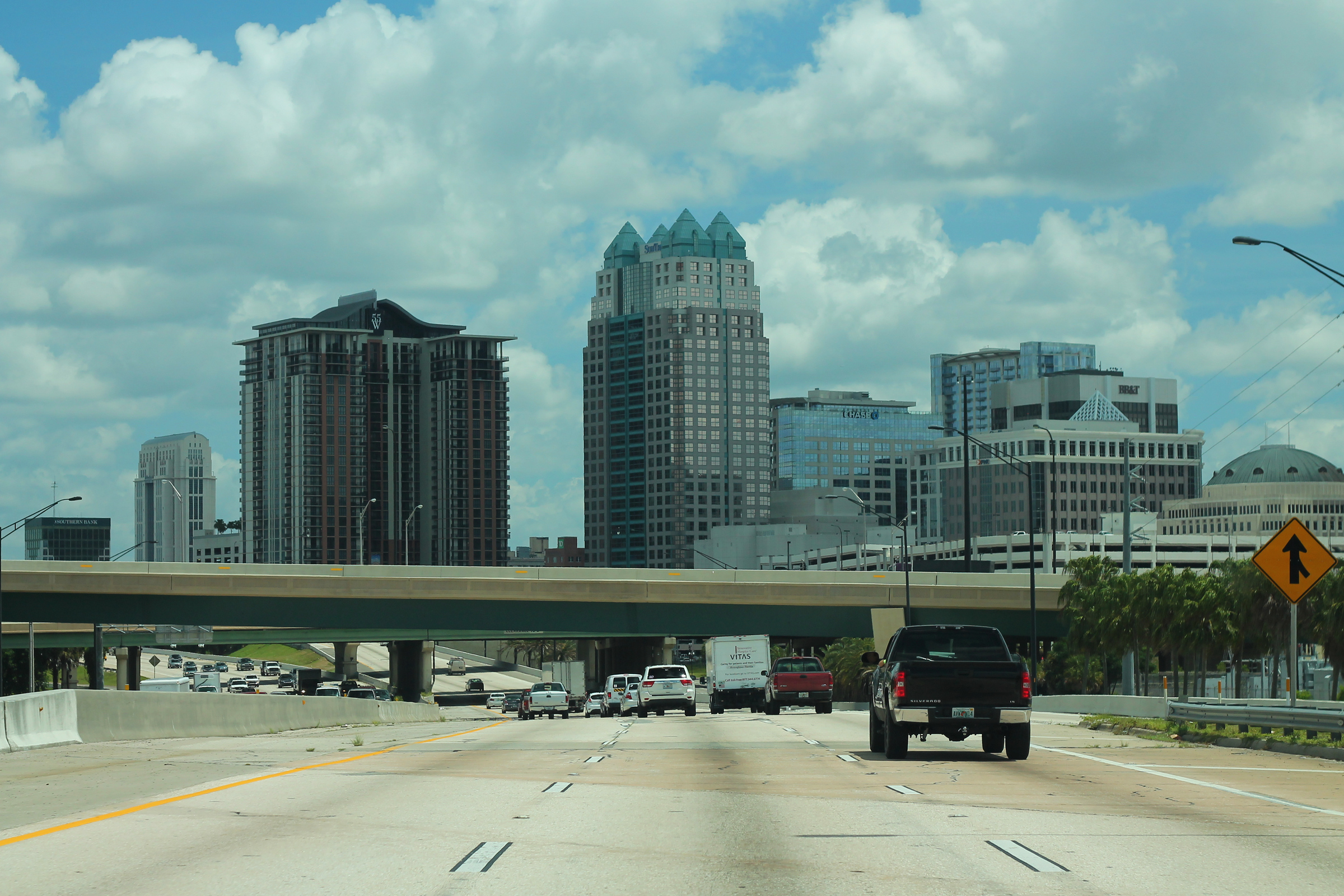
Approaching Downtown Orlando on eastbound I-4 (photo prior to I-4 Ultimate improvements)

For the next 40 miles (64 km), I-4 passes through Greater Orlando, where the highway forms the main north–south artery. From Kirkman Road to SR 434, is a 21-mile (34 km) section of I-4 that underwent a $2.3-billion reconstruction, known as I-4 Ultimate, and was completed on February 26, 2022. This project replaced most bridges, changed the configurations of many intersections, and added four express toll lanes—named I-4 Express along the entire section. The route then intersects all of the area's major toll roads, including Florida's Turnpike, and the East–West Expressway (SR 408). Orlando's main tourist strip—International Drive—runs parallel and no more than 1.5 miles (2.4 km) from I-4 between Kissimmee and Florida's Turnpike. Between Michigan Street and Kaley Avenue (about mile 81), I-4 turns due north (while still being signed east–west), heading past Downtown Orlando and its northern suburbs. Between South Street and Magnolia/Ivanhoe Street in Downtown Orlando, the service road for the eastbound lanes is Garland Avenue and the service road for the westbound lanes is Hughey Street.

After passing along the west side of Downtown Orlando, I-4 continues through the city's northern suburbs—including Winter Park, Maitland, Altamonte Springs, and Sanford. Around mile 91, I-4 enters Seminole County and, soon thereafter, shifts to a northeast heading. The Seminole Expressway (SR 417), after passing around the east side of Greater Orlando, has its northern terminus (exit 101B) at I-4 in Sanford. This intersection also connects with the Wekiva Parkway (SR 429), completing a full beltway (SR 429/SR 417; concurrent with I-4 for two miles [3.2 km]) around Greater Orlando. On October 21, 2022, the first part of this connection opened to traffic, with the westbound I-4 to southbound SR 429 ramp opening to traffic, along with the section of the southbound lanes between the ramp and SR 46.

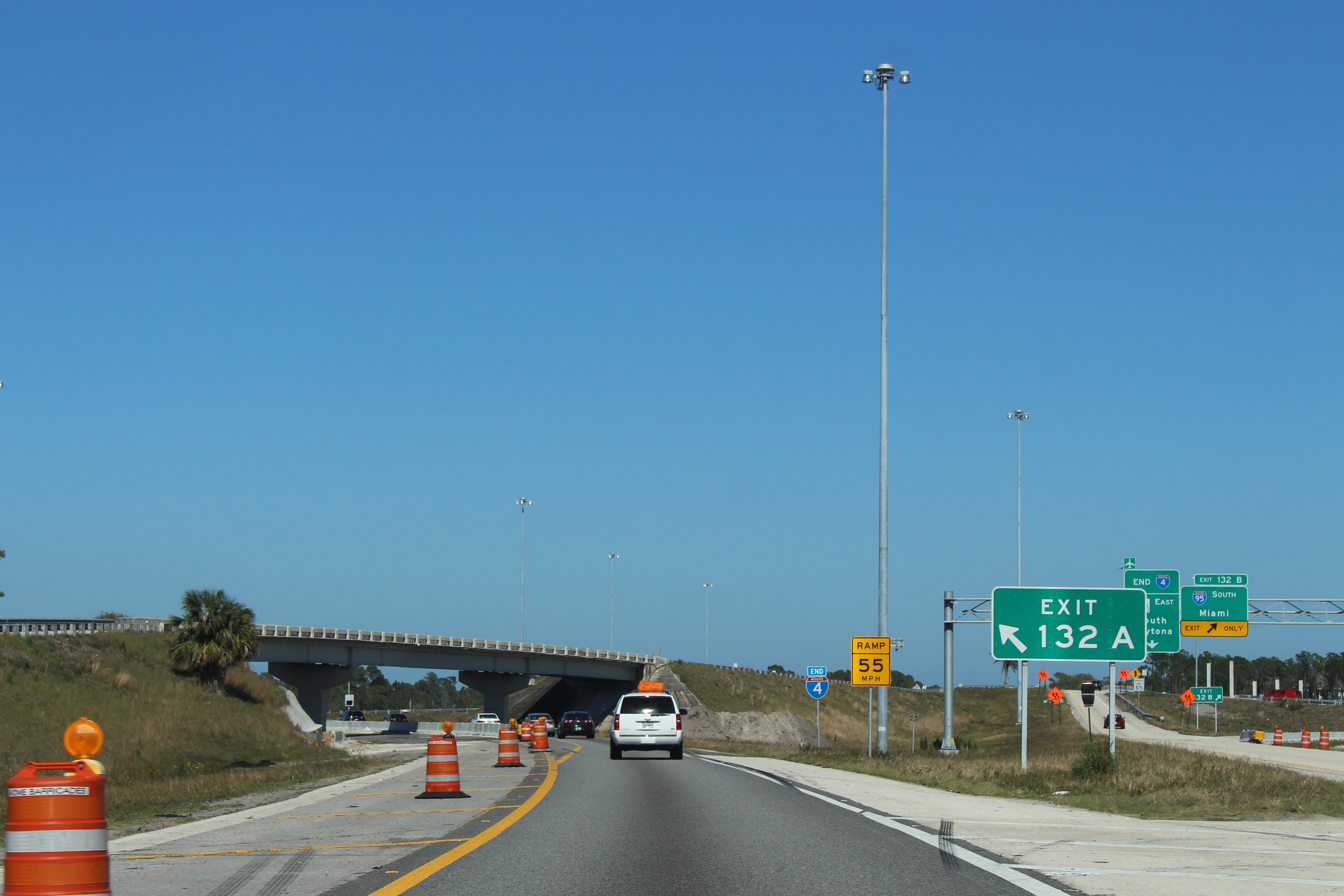
Eastern terminus of I-4 at I-95 near Daytona Beach

North of Sanford, I-4 is carried by the St. Johns River Veterans Memorial Bridge over the St. Johns River at the mouth of Lake Monroe. Along the bridge, I-4 enters Volusia County and passes Deltona and DeLand. The segment north of SR 44 has been widened from four to six lanes. Completed in winter 2016–2017, the entire length of I-4 has at least six lanes (three or more per direction). A 9.6 mile exitless stretch along Interstate 4 commences northeast from SR 44 and DeLand toward Daytona Beach. The freeway traverses wetland areas at Deep Creek Swamp and Tiger Bay State Forest along this stretch. I-4 terminates at a junction with I-95 near Daytona Beach. SR 400 continues east into Daytona Beach four miles (6.4 km) to US 1.

=== Services ===
I-4 has two pairs of rest areas, one near Polk City and the other near Longwood. At each location, there are separate facilities on opposite sides of the freeway that provide services to traffic in both directions. The rest areas all provide facilities with restrooms, picnic tables, drinking water, pet exercise areas, outside night lights, telephones, vending machines, and nighttime security.

FDOT closed a pair of rest areas at the Daryl Carter Parkway overpass (mile 70) near Lake Buena Vista in early 1999 and replaced them with retention ponds to serve runoff from an additional lane in each direction of I-4. Another former rest area, without any bathrooms, existed on the eastbound side near mile 127 in Volusia County.

A pair of weigh stations including weigh in motion scales is present at mile 12 between Tampa and Plant City. They were opened in January 2009 to replace a pair just west of the SR 566 interchange at mile 19.

== History ==
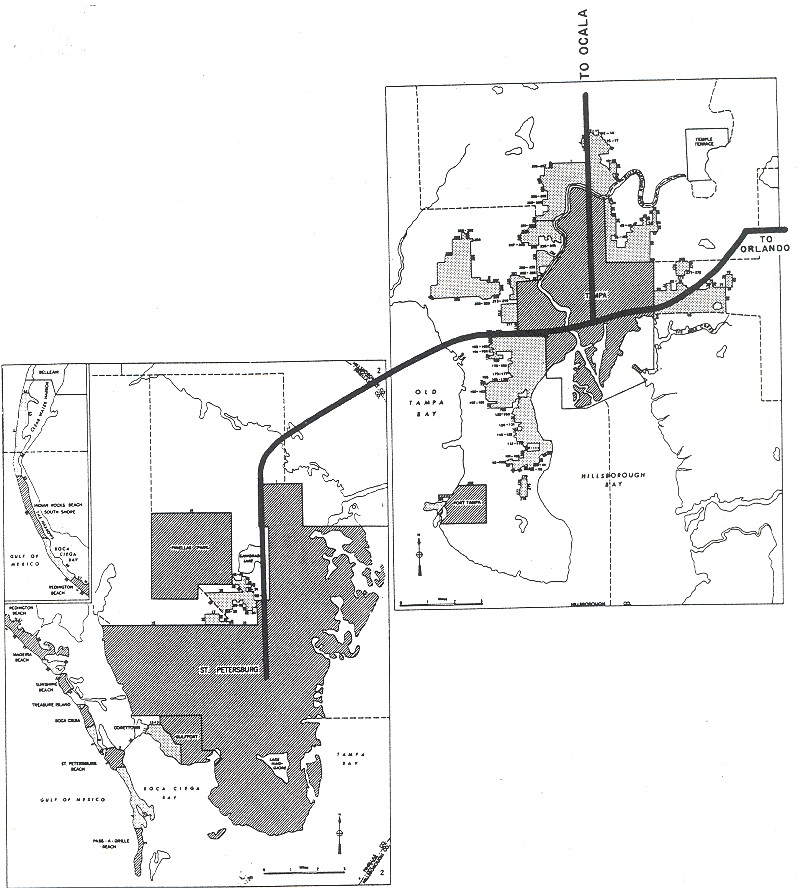
The original plans called for I-4 to extend to St. Petersburg

I-4 was one of the first Interstate Highways to be constructed in Florida, with the first section opening between Plant City and Lakeland in 1959. By early 1960, the Howard Frankland Bridge was opened to traffic, as well as the segment from the Hillsborough Avenue/US 301 junction in Tampa to Plant City. The stretch from Lake Monroe to Lake Helen, including the original St. Johns River Veterans Memorial Bridge also opened during that period. The segment from Tampa to Orlando was complete by 1962. By the mid-1960s, several segments were already complete, including Malfunction Junction in Tampa and parts of I-4 through Orlando. The original western terminus was set at Central Avenue (County Road 150 [CR 150]) in St. Petersburg, though a non-Interstate extension would have continued south and west to Pasadena. Proposed I-4 was later extended southwest to the present location of I-275 exit 20, with a planned temporary end at US 19 and 13th Avenue South, and a continuation to the Sunshine Skyway Bridge was also designated as part of I-4. Construction was stalled at 9th Street North (CR 803) for several years.

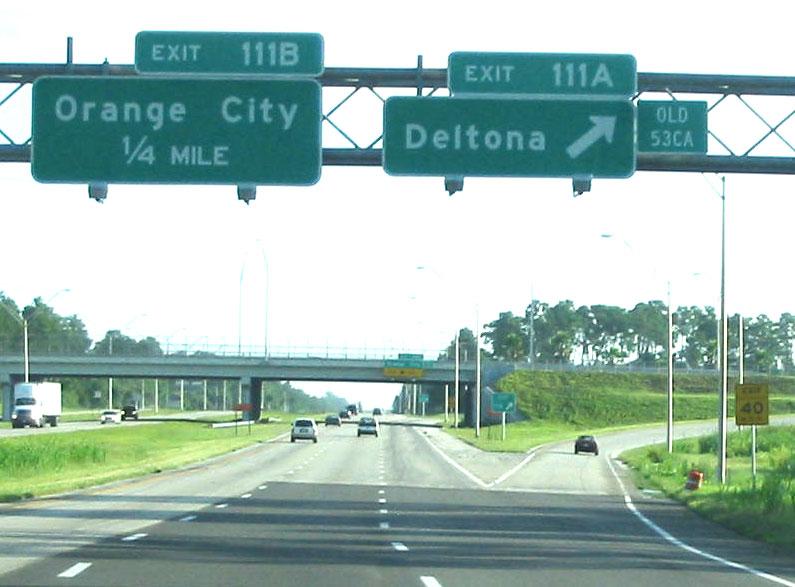
I-4 eastbound at exit 111 in Volusia County in 2005

The entire Interstate Highway was completed in 1965; however, the western terminus was truncated to Malfunction Junction in 1971 when I-75 was extended over the Howard Frankland Bridge. Eventually, that stretch was again redesignated to become part of I-275.

In maps and atlases dating to the 1950s, 1960s, and 1970s, the Tampa–St. Petersburg section of I-4/I-275 was marked as the Tampa Expressway. The Orlando segment was marked as the Orlando Expressway. Both names have since faded from maps.

Although many post-1970 interchanges along I-4 were constructed before the recent widening projects, they were designed with I-4 expansion in mind. Some of these interchanges include the I-75 turbine (constructed in the 1980s) and several interchanges serving the Walt Disney World Resort (constructed in the late 1980s and early 1990s).

In 2002, I-4, along with most of Florida's Interstates, switched over from a sequential exit numbering system to a mileage-based exit numbering system.

A section of I-4 between Daytona Beach and Orlando, called the "dead zone", is rumored to be haunted. In 2010, the East Central Florida Regional Planning Council (ECFRPC), using geographic information system technology, performed an analysis to determine if this identified zone had an increased fatality rate related to crashes. The analysis, which compared this section of I-4 to several other dangerous I-4 sections, found that, while the dead zone area did not have the highest accident or fatality rate, it did identify that the fatality rate per crash was significantly higher in this location. Multiple hurricanes, including three category 4 hurricanes (Donna, Charley, and Ian) have also passed over that area.

The median of I-4 between Tampa and Orlando has been historically slated to be used for the Florida High-Speed Corridor line between those cities. As a result of a state constitutional amendment to build a high-speed rail system between its five largest cities passed by voters in 2000, construction projects on I-4 included a wide median to accommodate a high-speed rail line. The high-speed rail project was canceled in 2004 but revived again in 2009. In 2010, the federal government awarded Florida over $2 billion (equivalent to $2.88 billion in 2025)—nearly the entire projected construction cost—to build the line, with work on the project to begin in 2011 and be completed by 2014. However, Governor Rick Scott's rejection of the funding ended the project.

On January 9, 2008, 70 vehicles were involved in a large pileup on I-4 near Polk City. The pileup was caused by an unexpected thick morning fog that was mixed with a scheduled—and approved—environmental burn by the Florida Fish and Wildlife Conservation Commission. The fog drifted across I-4, mixing with the smoke and reducing visibility to near-zero conditions. Four people were killed and 38 were injured. The section of I-4 did not reopen until the next day, January 10.

=== Tampa area ===
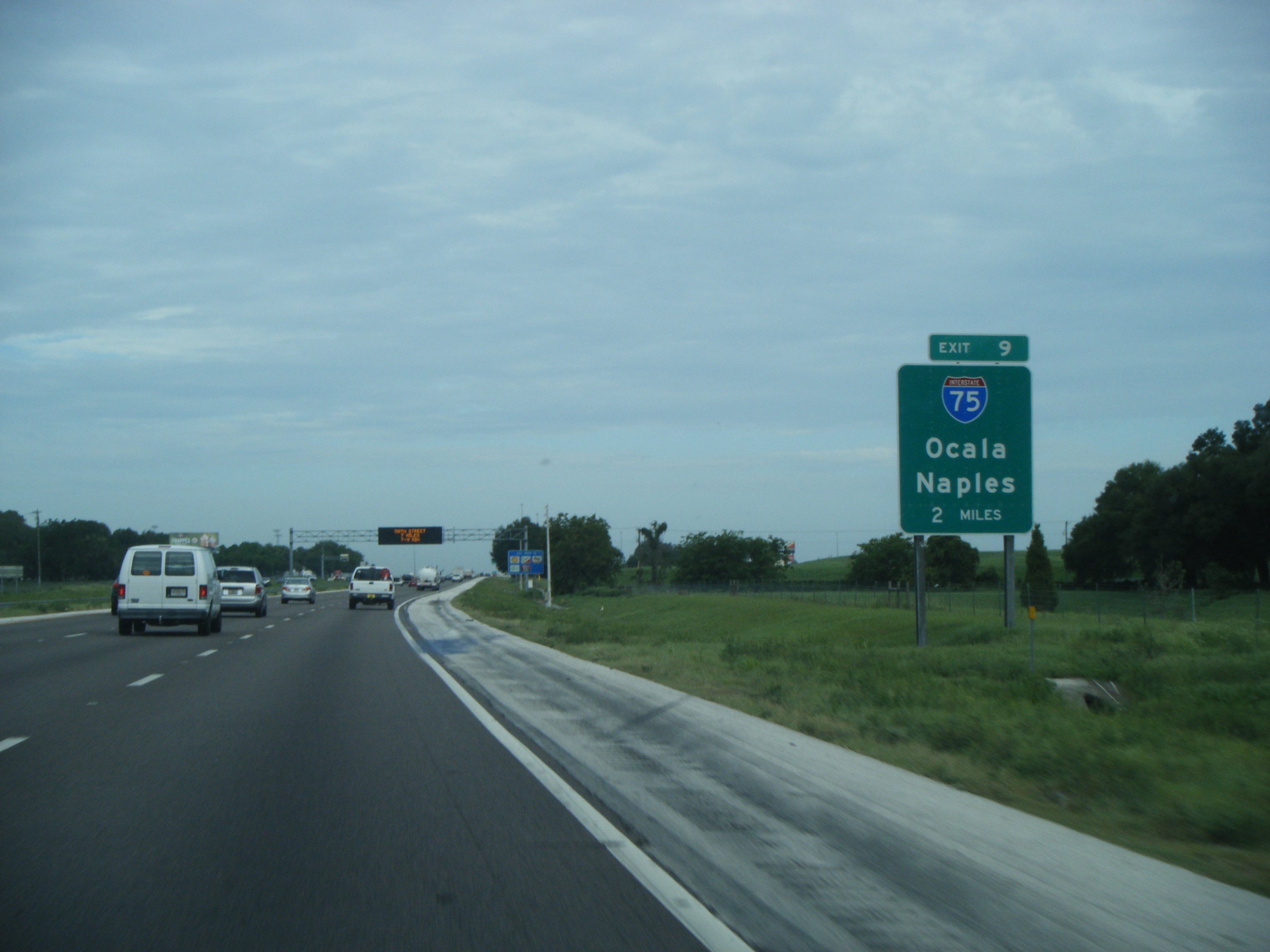
I-4 westbound two miles (3.2 km) from the I-75 interchange in 2012

The I-4/I-275 interchange (Malfunction Junction) was rebuilt from 2002 to 2007, and I-4 has been widened from four to six lanes (with eight lanes in certain segments).

Eastbound I-4 shifted to its new, permanent alignment between Malfunction Junction and 50th Street on August 8, 2006. The new alignment includes a right-lane ramp exit/entry at the 22nd Street/21st Street Interchange (the previous left-lane configuration was causing hazardous conditions to commuters since its opening in 2005). On August 11, 2006, a fourth lane opened on eastbound I-4 between the downtown junction and 50th Street (led in by a newly opened third lane on the eastbound I-4 ramp from northbound I-275). And, on August 18, the new westbound alignment, just west of 50th Street, opened. The newly opened lanes will improve flow throughout the interchange. The 50th Street overpass, however, would not be complete until late 2007. Also, the eastbound I-4 exit ramp to Columbus Drive/50th Street is situated to the left-hand side of the highway (as opposed to its former right-hand side exit). This exit shift went into effect in spring 2006 and is part of the new, permanent Interstate configuration.

In Tampa, the exit to 40th Street (SR 569), exit 2, was closed and demolished in late 2005 due to the ongoing reconstruction of I-4 and to accommodate a connector highway with the Lee Roy Selmon Expressway.

The interchange with what is today I-75 was constructed in the early 1980s.

=== Greater Orlando ===
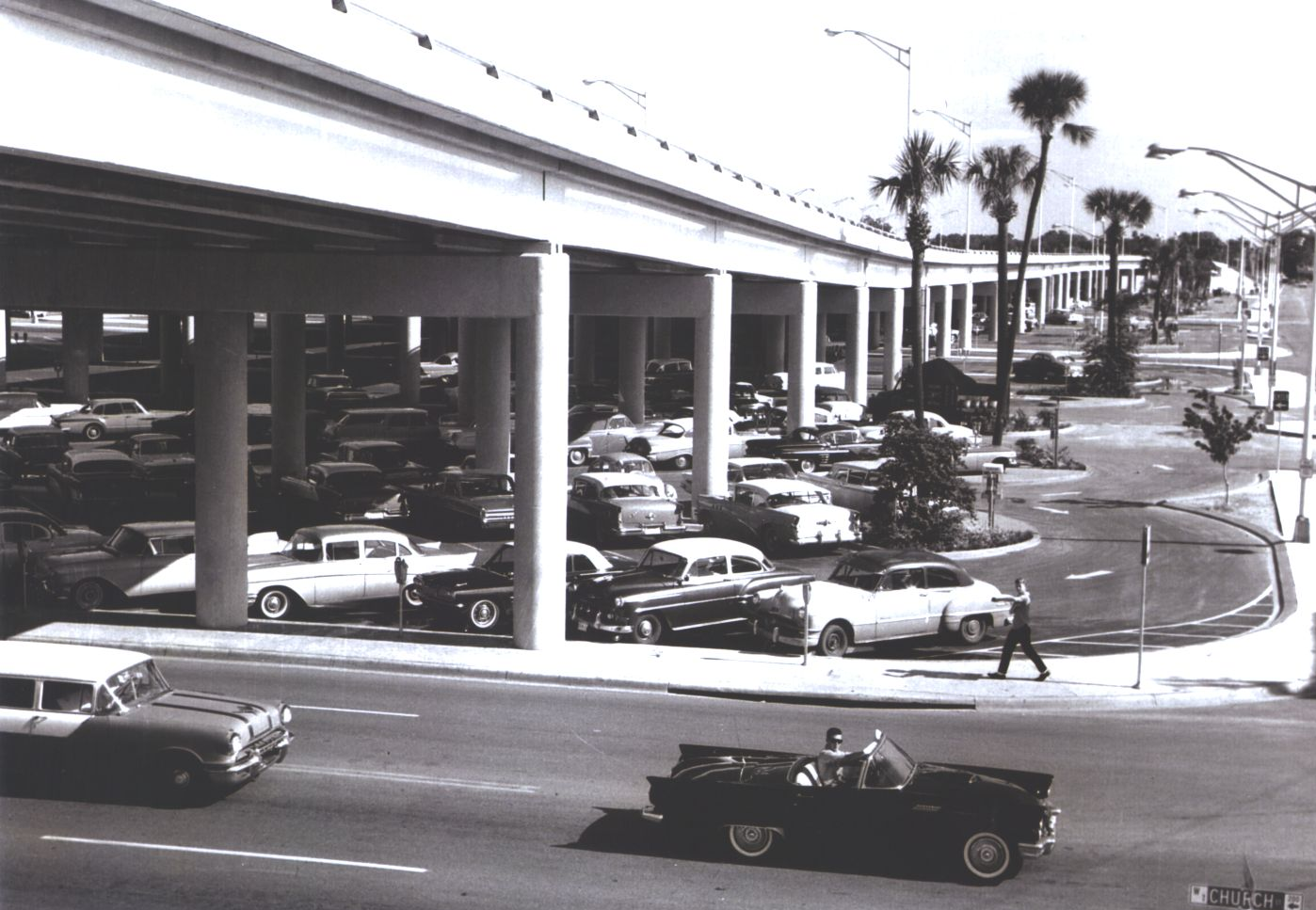
Parking lots under I-4 in Downtown Orlando, 1962

As Orlando grew in the 1970s and 1980s, traffic became a growing concern, especially after the construction of the original interchange with the East–West Expressway in 1973, which proved to become a principal bottleneck. The term "highway hostages" was coined in the 1980s to describe people stuck in long commutes to and from Orlando on I-4.

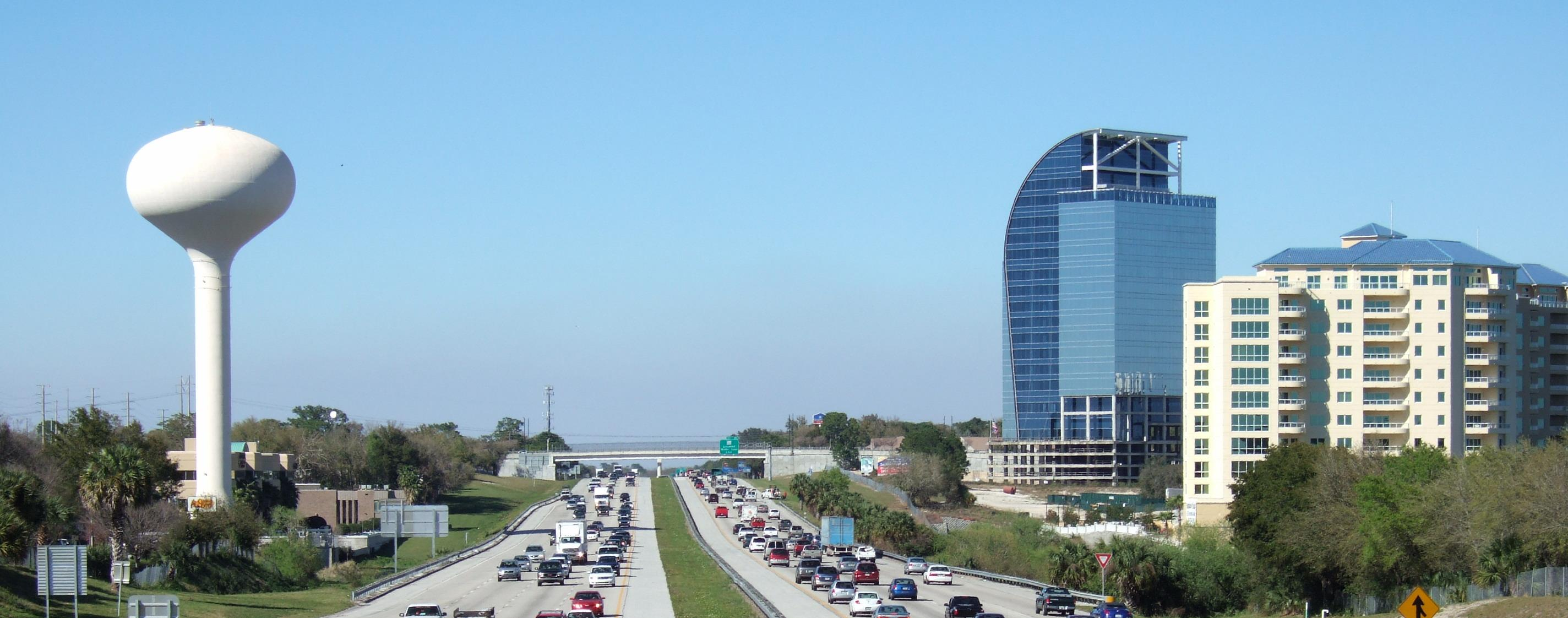
I-4 in Altamonte Springs

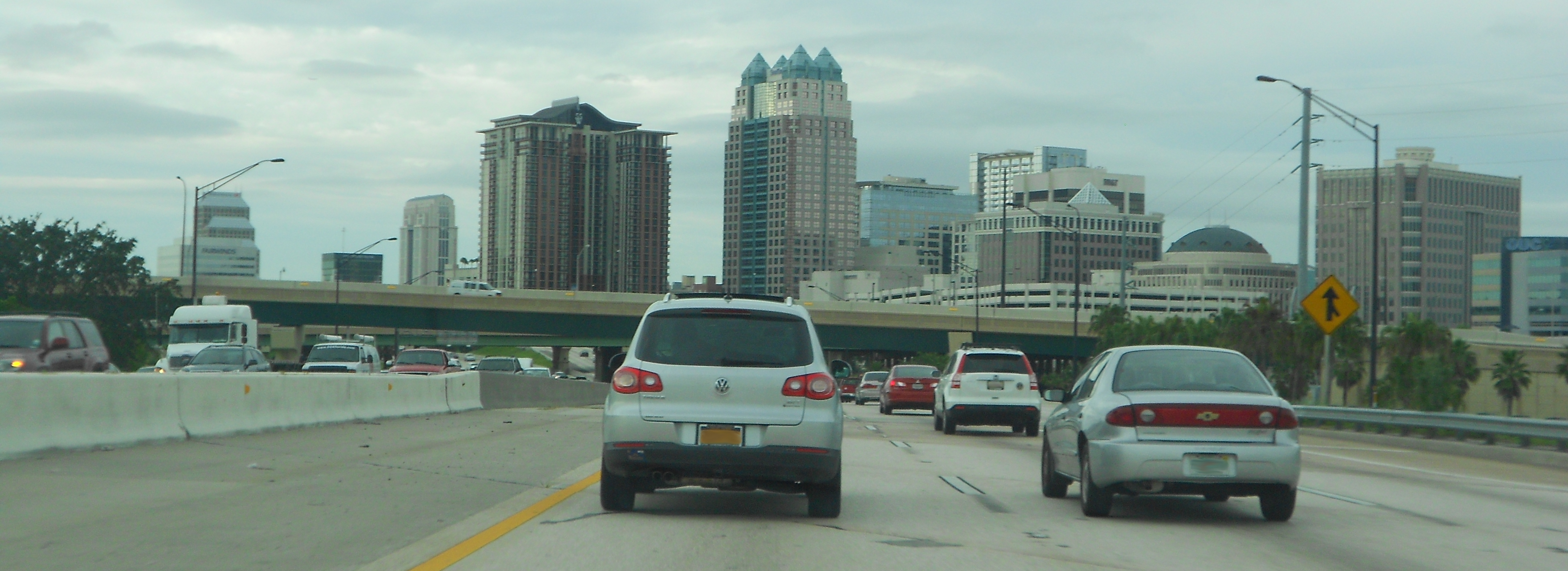
I-4 east toward Downtown Orlando

In the early-to-mid-1990s, several interchanges near Kissimmee were constructed or upgraded to accommodate increasing traffic going to and from Walt Disney World. However, I-4's mainlanes were not widened in the process. Around the same time, SR 417 was extended to I-4. Improvements to the US 192 junction were completed in 2007.

The St. Johns River Veterans Memorial Bridge, a two-span, six-lane replacement to the original four-lane bridge over the St. Johns River northeast of Orlando, was completed in 2004.

During the early 2000s, tolled express lanes were being planned in the Orlando area as a traffic congestion relief technique for rush-hour commuters. The name for them was to be Xpress 400, numbered after the state road designation for I-4. The express lanes were slated to extend from Universal Orlando, east to SR 434 in Longwood, and tolls were to be collected electronically via transponders like SunPass and Central Florida Expressway Authority's E-PASS, with prices dependent on the congestion of the eight mainlanes. However, the project was effectively banned by the passage of the Safe, Accountable, Flexible, Efficient Transportation Equity Act: A Legacy for Users federal transportation bill in 2005, introduced by US Representative John Mica. The plan for tolled express lanes is now moving forward as part of the $2.3-billion I-4 Ultimate project.

Interim improvements to the interchange at SR 408 were completed at the end of 2008. The eastbound exit to Robinson Street (SR 526) permanently closed on April 25, 2006, to make way for construction of the new eastbound onramp from SR 408. The westbound offramp to Gore Street was permanently closed in the same project on November 2, 2008.

The new overpass from I-4 west to John Young Parkway (CR 423) opened the morning of April 27, 2006.

==== Recent Greater Orlando history ====
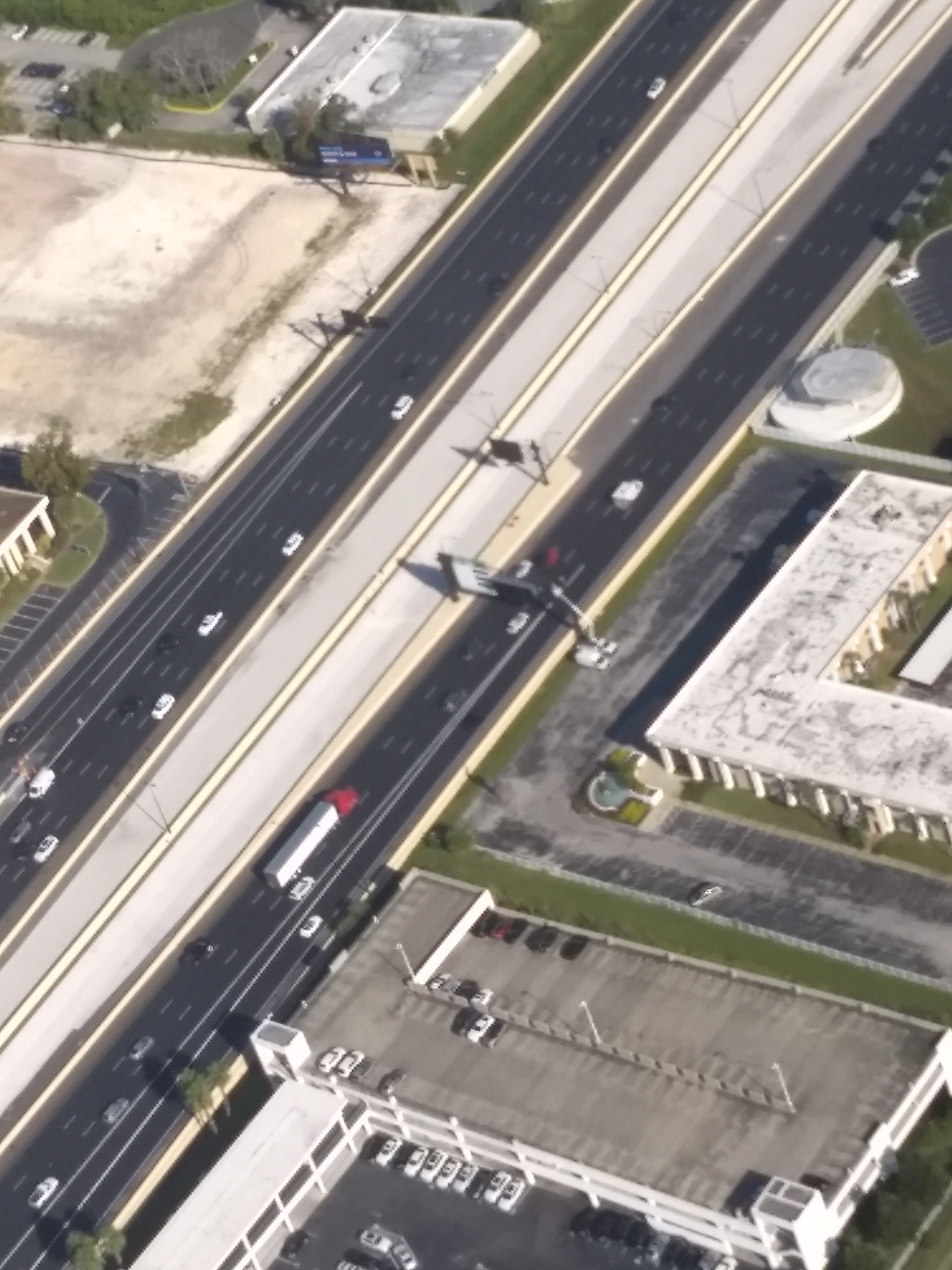
An aerial view of the I-4 Ultimate Express Lanes near Winter Park

A $2.3-billion (in year-of-expenditure dollars) project—dubbed I-4 Ultimate—reconstructed a 21-mile (34 km) stretch of I-4 through Orlando from SR 435 (exit 75) east to SR 434 (exit 94). The most noticeable change is the addition of four variable-toll express lanes along this section, called I-4 Express. The toll rates maintain an average speed of 60 mph (97 km/h). Additionally, the general-use lanes were rebuilt, 15 major interchanges were reconfigured, 53 new bridges were added, and 75 bridges were replaced. A pedestrian bridge was built over the highway near Maitland Boulevard, with a second pedestrian bridge being built over SR 435 at the intersection with both Major Boulevard and Tom Williams Way. A pedestrian tunnel was constructed under SR 436. The project also reduced the curve radius and improved line-of-sight along the notorious Fairbanks Curve south of Fairbanks Avenue, which is the most accident-prone section of I-4.

FDOT proposed adding barrier-separated high-occupancy vehicle (HOV) lanes to I-4 through Greater Orlando in the 1990s, possibly funded by tolls, but proposals for express lanes (including reversible toll lanes and high-occupancy toll [HOT] lanes) were blocked by politics for the next 15 years. In 2012, a legislative ban on tolls along I-4, which had been in place for seven years, ended, and FDOT began soliciting private enterprises to build and help finance the project in a public–private partnership. In February 2013, the state legislature and governor gave approval for FDOT to proceed with the public–private partnership on this section of I-4 in February 2013, and, the following year, FDOT selected I-4 Mobility Partners to design, construct, finance, maintain, and operate the project for 40 years. FDOT and I-4 Mobility Partners reached commercial and financial close, and a public–private partnership concession agreement was executed in September 2014. The final design phase began in October 2014. On February 1, 2015, FDOT turned the project over to I-4 Mobility Partners, and, on February 18, transportation officials and the governor held a groundbreaking ceremony for the project in Maitland. After seven years of construction, the express lanes opened to traffic the morning of February 26, 2022, and began tolling on March 3, 2022.

The Wekiva Parkway—a 25-mile (40 km) segment of SR 429—connects to SR 417 at the I-4 interchange in Sanford. Together with SR 417 and a 3.4-mile (5.5 km) section of I-4, it completes the beltway around Orlando. On October 21, 2022, the first part of this connection opened to traffic, with the westbound I-4 to southbound SR 429 ramp opening to traffic, along with the section of the southbound lanes between the ramp and SR 46. After spending $255 million, FDOT completed the Wekiva Parkway by building 2.63 miles of expressway between Orange Boulevard and the I-4/SR 417 junction in Sanford. The project was completed on January 26, 2024, completing the beltway around Central Florida. The project also involves building future I-4 Beyond the Ultimate lanes from SR 417 to SR 46.

As part of the $7 billion project known as the Moving Florida Forward Infrastructure initiative, the section of I-4 from U.S. 27 in Polk County to World Drive in Osceola County was identified as an area of critical need. The construction of two additional lanes, one in each direction between U.S. 27 and World Drive began in late 2024 and was completed by April 2025, 8 months ahead of schedule and opened to traffic the last week of April, delivering congestion relief to one of the state's most congested sections of roadway.

=== Rural areas ===
The final four-lane segment of I-4, from SR 44 to I-95, was widened to six lanes. Completed in winter 2016–2017, the whole highway is at least six lanes wide.

== Future ==
=== I-4 Beyond the Ultimate ===
I-4 Beyond the Ultimate, which includes extensions of the I-4 Express toll lanes, both southwest and northeast of the I-4 Ultimate project, is undergoing planning and design, while preliminary interchange improvements are underway.

In 2013, FDOT initiated a study to reevaluate previous feasibility studies, made between 1998 and 2005, in which the addition of HOV or express toll lanes were considered. The extensions cover approximately 40 miles (64 km) of I-4 through Greater Orlando. Southwest of the I-4 Ultimate, the study examined an extension through Osceola County to US 27 in Polk County. Northeast of the I-4 Ultimate, the study examined an extension through Seminole County to SR 472 in Volusia County. These boundaries were ultimately chosen for the project.

In addition to these express lane extensions, many interchanges will be reconstructed as part of the project. Two of these reconstructed interchanges will be converted to diverging diamond interchanges, which are proposed at both CR 532 (exit 58) and SR 482 (exit 74A). The interchange with CR 532 opened up in 2023, with the interchange with SR 482 being currently under construction. A brand new interchange at Daryl Carter Parkway (exit 70), also a partial diverging diamond, was opened on July 19, 2025.

Unlike I-4 Ultimate, where the 21 miles (34 km) encompassed by that project were constructed at once, the 40 miles (64 km) encompassed by I-4 Beyond the Ultimate will be constructed in segments. Segment 1 goes from the Central Florida Parkway to US 27, with this segment also being part of the Moving I-4 Forward program. Segment 2 runs from the Central Florida Parkway to I-4 Ultimate at Kirkman Road. Segment 3 runs from I-4 Ultimate at SR 434 to US-17 and US-92. Segment 4 runs from US-17 and US 92 to SR 472. All segments have been studied are currently undergoing planning and design.

=== Tampa Bay Express (TBX) ===
In January 2015, FDOT unveiled its master plan for a system of express toll lanes in the Tampa Bay area—dubbed Tampa Bay Express (TBX)—on I-4, I-75, and I-275 and began public meetings for community input. On I-4, these lanes would extend approximately 26 miles (42 km) from I-275 to west of the Polk Parkway (SR 570). At the junction with I-275, the initial concept alignment calls for a direct connection between the express toll lanes of both highways. Express bus lanes for regional service and a long-distance bus service were studied for inclusion in the plan. The I-4 corridor was considered in the bus lane study, but the resultant proposal included installation only on I-275 and I-75. Two new express lanes are planned to be added to interstate spanning from the I-75 intersection to County Line Road. These lanes, announced in 2021, are planned to start construction in 2028, despite significant community opposition to high toll costs and demolishing of over 200 buildings.

=== Passenger rail service ===
==== Brightline to Tampa ====
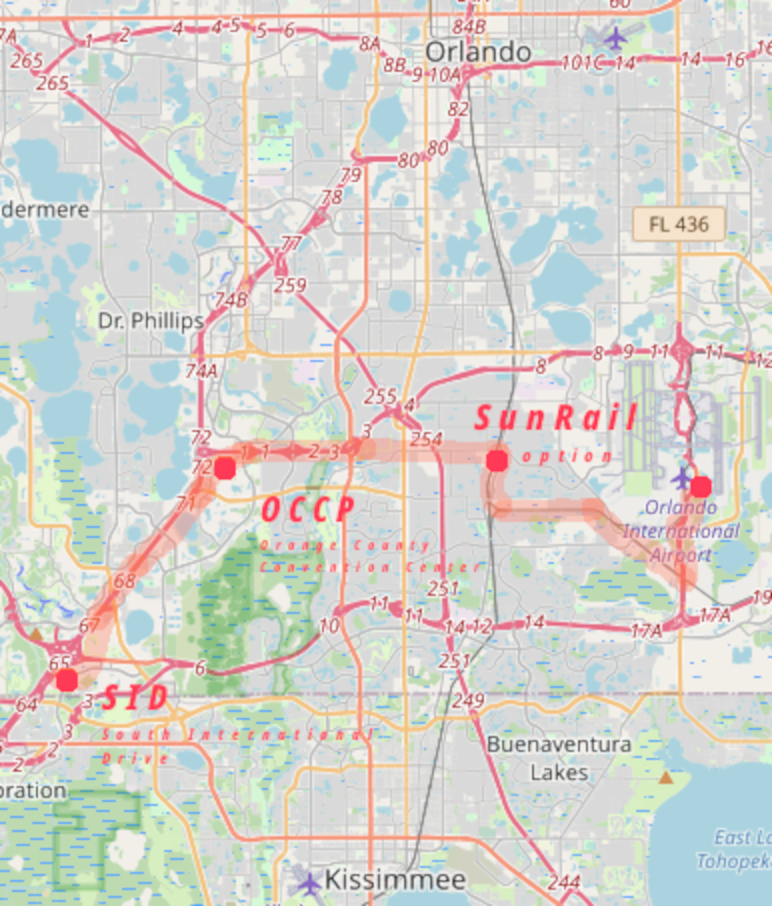
The Brightline "Sunshine Corridor" Orlando alignment as of 2022

Despite the cancellation of the Florida High-Speed Corridor in 2011, the following year, All Aboard Florida, now Brightline, announced its intentions to build an inter-city rail route between Miami and Orlando, which eventually began operations in September 2023. Brightline is currently in the planning stages of developing an expansion of service between Orlando and Tampa using the I-4 right-of-way.

As of September 2019, Brightline was in negotiations with the Florida Department of Transportation (FDOT) to lease right-of-way along the I-4 corridor. Brightline was the only bidder to submit a proposal to construct an intercity rail line along Interstate 4, which has been designated for federally funded high-speed rail. This would be utilized for an extension of the line from Orlando International Airport to Tampa.

Potential stops along this route are the SunRail Meadow Woods station and Lakeland. The deadline for the negotiations between Central Florida Expressway Authority, FDOT, and Brightline was March 31, 2020. In September 2020, the railroad entered into a memorandum of understanding with a local developer to potentially construct the terminal station in Ybor City.

In November 2020, Brightline and Walt Disney World Resort announced an agreement to build a station in Disney Springs as a part of its Tampa extension. The high-speed rail corridor between Disney Springs and Orlando International Airport was projected to cost $1 billion and travel alongside Florida State Road 417. As of 2021 the project had yet to secure needed funding, but passenger service was planned to start by 2026.

In May 2022, Universal Orlando offered 13 acres of land near the site where Universal Epic Universe is being built for a commuter station, and bond guarantees. This was claimed to promote construction of an extension of Brightline that would include a brief confluence with SunRail between SunRail's Meadow Woods and Pine Castle stations, and lead to Disney, eventually to Tampa. They did not mention the existing proposal to run Brightline down SR 417 to Disney Springs, but it did suggest a future SunRail service to Epic Universe, the Orange County Convention Center, and Disney Springs.

In June 2022, Disney announced that Brightline would not run on their Walt Disney World park property; however Brightline said it would still build a station near Disney World to get riders as close as possible.

On July 11, 2025, Spectrum News reported that Brightline is looking to raise $400 million in funding to pay for an expansion of its high-speed rail service into Tampa through the Florida Development Finance Corporation. If approved, the funds could be used to design, develop and build the new route from Orlando to Tampa.

On July 15, 2025, Tampa's city board voted unanimously through the TEFRA (Tax Equity and Fiscal Responsibility Act) process to allow Brightline to continue negotiating with Florida Development Finance Corporation. Reports on when the Tampa expansion of Brightline could arrive vary between sources, with then Tampa Mayor Jane Castor has suggesting a launch as soon as 2029, but Hillsborough County transportation planning organization director Johnny Wong stating that an expansion could take until 2035. Independent transportation analysts predict an opening sometime in the late 2030s.

==== SunRail to Daytona Beach ====
In 2014, FDOT began a study of the feasibility of extending the SunRail commuter train line to Daytona Beach, primarily focusing on the use of the I-4 median. The widening project from SR 44 to I-95 maintained a median wide enough to accommodate a potential future rail line, although the proposal has largely been met with skepticism by local leaders. There is currently no plans for funding for studies or future construction of this line.

=== Other projects ===
The Central Polk Parkway is a planned tolled expressway in eastern Polk County that will connect I-4 near Davenport with the Polk Parkway near Bartow. The first segment from the Polk Parkway to US 17 started construction in March 2023 and is estimated to be completed in summer 2027. The I-4 connection in Davenport is currently in the final segment of the project. Additionally, FDOT is conducting an ACE study for a 5-to-11.5-mile (8.0 to 18.5 km) connection between I-4 and the Poinciana Parkway—a short, tolled expressway completed in 2016 between US 17/US 92 and the community of Poinciana. Another expansion project to be completed in 2027 aims to expand the interchange between I-4 and I-275, bringing an extra lane in most directions. In June 2026, construction started on five new truck parking stations, adding 917 new parking spots along the corridor of the I-4 including over 100 spots at a station at the interchange with the Polk Parkway.

I-4 Florida's Regional Advanced Mobility Elements (FRAME) is a regional corridor management program addressing safety and mobility concerns along a 77 mile stretch of the interstate from Tampa to southwest Orlando, developed jointly by FDOT and Florida Polytechnic University. Using analytics from the University’s research team and roadside units that can communicate with software in vehicles, the project aims to alert drivers of oncoming obstacles and traffic and possibly prevent accidents.

== Exit list ==
County	Location	mi	km	Old exit	New exit	Destinations	Notes
Hillsborough	Tampa	0.000	0.000		—	I-275 south – Tampa International Airport, St. Petersburg; SR 400 begins	Western terminus of I-4/SR 400; western end of SR 400 concurrency; exit 45B on I-275
Hillsborough	Tampa	0.000	0.000		45A	Downtown East–West	Westbound exit only; exit number based on I-275 mileage
Hillsborough	Tampa	0.000	0.000			I-275 north – Ocala	Westbound exit and eastbound entrance; exit 45B on I-275
Hillsborough	Tampa	1.154	1.857		1	Cruise Ships 21st Street / 22nd Street/ East 13th Avenue	Former SR 585
Hillsborough	Tampa	1.76	2.83		2	SR 618 (Selmon Expressway) – Brandon, Port of Tampa	Access via I-4–Selmon Expressway Connector (left exits, both directions); access to or from SR 618 only in the same direction
Hillsborough	Tampa	2.463	3.964		2	SR 569 (40th Street)	Closed
Hillsborough	Tampa	3.266	5.256		3	US 41 (50th Street) / Columbus Drive	Left exit eastbound, left entrance westbound
Hillsborough	East Lake-Orient Park	4.706	7.574	4	5	SR 574 (Martin Luther King Jr. Boulevard)	Access to St. Joseph's Hospital, St. Joseph's Children's Hospital, and St. Joseph's Women's Hospital
Hillsborough	East Lake-Orient Park	5.573	8.969	5	6	Orient Road	Eastbound exit and westbound entrance
Hillsborough	East Lake-Orient Park	6.683	10.755	6	7	US 301 / US 92 east – Riverview, Zephyrhills	US 301 north access via US 92 east; access to Tampa Executive Airport and Florida State Fairgrounds
Hillsborough	East Lake-Orient Park	6.683	10.755	6	7	US 92 west (Hillsborough Avenue) to US 301 – Busch Gardens	Westbound access to or from US 92 west; access to Tampa Executive Airport and Florida State Fairgrounds
Hillsborough	Mango	8.610	13.856	7	9	I-75 – Ocala, Naples	Exit 261 on I-75, turbine interchange
Hillsborough	Mango	10.142	16.322	8	10	CR 579 (Mango Road) – Mango, Thonotosassa	
Hillsborough	Dover	13.876	22.331	9	14	McIntosh Road	
Hillsborough	Dover	17.434	28.057	10	17	Branch Forbes Road	Serves Dinosaur World
Hillsborough	Plant City	19.518	31.411	11	19	SR 566 (Thonotosassa Road)	
Hillsborough	Plant City	21.280	34.247	13	21	SR 39 (Alexander Street) / SR 39A (Buchman Highway)	Alexander Street was originally old exit 12, but was combined with 13; access to South Florida Baptist Hospital
Hillsborough	Plant City	22.596	36.365	14	22	Park Road	SR 553 not signed
Hillsborough		25.563	41.140	15	25	County Line Road	
Polk	Lakeland	26.530	42.696	15A	27	SR 570 east (Polk Parkway) – Lakeland, Winter Haven, Bartow	Western terminus of SR 570; To Lakeland Linder International Airport and Legoland Florida
Polk	Lakeland	28.365	45.649	16	28	To US 92 (Memorial Boulevard) – Lakeland	Access via unsigned SR 546
Polk	Lakeland	30.675	49.367	17	31	SR 539 – Kathleen, Lakeland	Serves Munn Park Historic District, RP Funding Center,Bonnet Springs Park, and Keiser University
Polk	Lakeland	32.003	51.504	18	32	US 98 – Lakeland, Dade City	Serves Lakeland Square Mall
Polk	Lakeland	33.440	53.816	19	33	SR 33 / CR 582 – Lakeland	CR 582 not signed eastbound; SR 33 not signed westbound; Serves Joker Marchant Stadium
Polk	Lakeland	37.894	60.984	20	38	SR 33	
Polk	Lakeland	41.223	66.342	20A	41	SR 570 west (Polk Parkway) – Auburndale, Lakeland	Exit 24 on SR 570; serves Florida Polytechnic University (southwest corner of interchange)
Polk	Auburndale	43.981	70.781	21	44	SR 559 – Polk City, Auburndale	Serves Fantasy of Flight
Polk		47.982	77.220	22	48	CR 557 – Lake Alfred, Winter Haven	
Polk		54.733	88.084	23	55	US 27 – Haines City, Davenport	Serves Legoland Florida, Peppa Pig Theme Park and Heart of Florida Regional Medical Center
Polk–Osceola county line	Four Corners	57.723	92.896	24	58	CR 532 east – Poinciana, Kissimmee	Diverging diamond interchange; implemented July 10, 2022
Osceola	Four Corners	59.663	96.018		60	SR 429 north (Western Expressway) – Apopka	Exit 1 on SR 429
Osceola	Celebration	61.781	99.427	24C-D-E	62	SR 417 north (Central Florida GreeneWay) – Disney World, Celebration, Orlando International Airport, Sanford	Collector/distributor lanes serve two junctions with one exit: full interchange for Celebration/Disney World, eastbound exit and westbound entrance for SR 417; Temporarily signed 62A and 62B eastbound during construction
Osceola	Celebration	64.165	103.264	25A-B	64	US 192 – Kissimmee, Magic Kingdom	Access to AdventHealth Celebration
Osceola	Celebration	65.322	105.126	26C-D	65	Osceola Parkway (CR 522 east) – Animal Kingdom, Hollywood Studios	
Orange	Lake Buena Vista	66.565	107.126	26A-B	67	SR 536 east to SR 417 north – Epcot, Disney Springs	Access to Orlando World Center Marriott and South International Drive
Orange	Lake Buena Vista	68.107	109.608	27	68	SR 535 – Kissimmee, Lake Buena Vista	
Orange	Lake Buena Vista				70	Daryl Carter Parkway	Partial diverging diamond interchange; westbound entrance to be constructed at a later time; opened July 19, 2025
Orange	Williamsburg	70.983	114.236	27A	71	Central Florida Parkway / International Drive - SeaWorld	Eastbound exit and westbound entrance
Orange	Williamsburg	71.744	115.461	28	72	SR 528 east (Beachline Expressway) – Orlando International Airport, Cape Canaveral, International Drive	To Epic Universe, Sea World, Orange County Convention Center, Kennedy Space Center and Port Canaveral; western terminus of SR 528
Orange	Orlando	73.732	118.660	29A	74A	SR 482 east (Sand Lake Road) – International Drive, Orlando International Airport	Diverging diamond interchange; Direct connection ramp to Turkey Lake Road opened May 2nd, 2026; access to Orlando Health Dr. P. Phillips
Orange	Orlando	75.246	121.097	29B 30A	74B 75A	Universal, Universal Boulevard / International Drive	Westbound exit 74B, eastbound exit 75A
Orange	Orlando	75.246	121.097			I-4 Express east	Western end of Express Lanes
Orange	Orlando	75.246	121.097	30B	75B	SR 435 (Kirkman Road) / International Drive	Split into exits 75A (north) and 75B (south/International Drive) westbound; International Drive not signed eastbound; serves Volcano Bay and Fun Spot America
Orange	Orlando	75.246	121.097		—	Grand National Drive	Interchange for Express Lanes only
Orange	Orlando	76.359	122.888	31	77	Florida's Turnpike – Miami, Ocala	Northbound entrance to Turnpike is tolled; exit 259 on Florida's Turnpike
Orange	Orlando	76.359	122.888		—	Florida's Turnpike south	Interchange for Express Lanes only; westbound exit and eastbound entrance
Orange	Orlando	77.760	125.143	31A	78	Conroy Road	Serves The Mall at Millenia
Orange	Orlando	79.147	127.375	32	79	CR 423 (John Young Parkway)	
Orange	Orlando	80.474	129.510	33A 33B	80	US 17 / US 92 / US 441 (Orange Blossom Trail)	Westbound exit does not give access to US 17 north, US 92 east, nor US 441 north; formerly signed as exits 80A-B eastbound
Orange	Orlando	80.474	129.510	33B	80B	US 17 north / US 92 east / US 441 north	Closed; previously eastbound exit and westbound entrance
Orange	Orlando	81.004	130.363	34 35	81	Michigan Street/Kaley Avenue to US 17 north / US 92 east / US 441 north	Formerly signed Exit 81A
Orange	Orlando	81.469	131.112	34 35	81	Kaley Avenue / Michigan Street	Formerly signed Exit 81B; Access to Orlando Regional Medical Center, Orlando Health/Amtrak station (Amtrak Train Terminal), and SunRail
Orange	Orlando				—	SR 408 east	Interchange for Express Lanes only; eastbound exit only
Orange	Orlando	82.116– 82.78	132.153– 133.22	36	82	SR 408 (East–West Expressway) – Ocoee, Titusville, UCF	Exit 10 on SR 408
Orange	Orlando	82.116– 82.78	132.153– 133.22	37 38	82B	Gore Street	Closed; previously westbound entrance only; westbound exit closed
Orange	Orlando	82.116– 82.78	132.153– 133.22	37 38	82B	Anderson Street	Closed; previously westbound exit and eastbound entrance; formerly exit 82C
Orange	Orlando	82.116– 82.78	132.153– 133.22	39	83	South Street, Anderson Street	Eastbound signed South Street, westbound signed Anderson Street; Access to Kia Center
Orange	Orlando	82.116– 82.78	132.153– 133.22			Anderson Street	Interchange for Express Lanes only; eastbound entrance only
Orange	Orlando	82.116– 82.78	132.153– 133.22		—	South Street	Interchange for Express Lanes only; no eastbound entrance
Orange	Orlando	82.116– 82.78	132.153– 133.22		—	SR 408 west	Interchange for Express Lanes only; westbound exit only
Orange	Orlando	82.116– 82.78	132.153– 133.22	36	82A	SR 408 (East–West Expressway)	Closed; previous interchange configuration
Orange	Orlando	83.30	134.06	40	83A	SR 526 (Robinson Street)	Closed; was eastbound exit and westbound entrance
Orange	Orlando	83.792	134.850	41	84A	SR 50 (Colonial Drive) / Amelia Street	Formerly signed as exit 83A westbound, 83B eastbound; Access to Bob Carr Theater, Orange County Regional History Center
Orange	Orlando	84.279	135.634	42	84B	SR 50 west (Colonial Drive west)	Eastbound exit and westbound entrance
Orange	Orlando	84.279	135.634	42	84B	Ivanhoe Boulevard	Westbound exit and eastbound entrance; also include Express Lane access
Orange	Orlando	85.135	137.012	43	85	Princeton Street	Former SR 438; access to AdventHealth Orlando
Orange	Orlando	85.890	138.227	44	86	Par Street	Eastbound exit and westbound entrance
Orange	Winter Park	86.789	139.673	45	87	SR 426 (Fairbanks Avenue)	Access to Rollins College and Winter Park Historic District
Orange	Winter Park	87.767	141.247	46	88	SR 423 (Lee Road)	Western end of US 17 Truck / US 92 Truck concurrency; serves Eatonville
Orange	Maitland	89.491	144.022	47	90A-B	SR 414 (Maitland Boulevard) – Apopka	Access via collector/distributor lanes; eastern end of US 17 Truck / US 92 Truck concurrency; signed as exits 90A (east) and 90B (west)
Orange	Maitland	89.491	144.022		90C	Lake Destiny Road	Westbound exit and entrance via C/D lanes
Seminole	Altamonte Springs	91.631	147.466	48	92	SR 436 (Altamonte Drive) – Altamonte Springs, Apopka, Casselberry	Casselberry signed eastbound and Apopka signed westbound as secondary cities; access to AdventHealth Altamonte Springs and Altamonte Mall
Seminole	Altamonte Springs					Central Parkway	Interchange for Express Lanes only; eastbound exit and westbound entrance
Seminole	Wekiwa Springs					I-4 Express west	Eastern end of Express Lanes
Seminole	Wekiwa Springs	93.613	150.656	49	94	SR 434 – Longwood, Winter Springs	Access to Orlando Health South Seminole
Seminole	Lake Mary	98.400	158.359	50	98	Lake Mary, Heathrow, Sanford Airport	Access to Seminole State College, SunRail, Orlando Health Lake Mary
Seminole	Lake Mary	100.628	161.945	51A	101A	CR 46A – Sanford, Heathrow	
Seminole	Sanford	101.366	163.133	—	101B-C	SR 417 south (Seminole Expressway) / SR 429 south (Wekiva Parkway) – Orlando Sanford International Airport, Orlando International Airport, Mount Dora	Ramp from westbound I-4 to southbound SR 429 opened to traffic along with section of southbound lanes of SR 429 to SR 46 on October 21, 2022, remaining connections opened on January 26, 2024; Exit 55A (SR-417/SR-429)
Seminole	Sanford	102.505	164.966	51, 101C	101D	SR 46 – Mount Dora, Sanford Historic District	Access to Amtrak Auto Train Sanford station (Amtrak)
Seminole	Lake Monroe	103.997	167.367	52	104	US 17 / US 92 – Sanford	Access to HCA Florida Lake Monroe and Central Florida Zoo
Lake Monroe				St. Johns River Veterans Memorial Bridge			
Volusia	Deltona	107.821	173.521	53	108	CR 4162 – DeBary, Deltona	
Volusia	Deltona–Orange City line	110.636	178.051	53CA	111A	CR 4146 – Deltona	
Volusia	Deltona–Orange City line	110.636	178.051	53CB	111B	CR 4146 – Orange City	Access to AdventHealth Fish Memorial
Volusia	Deltona–Orange City– DeLand tripoint	113.783	183.116	54	114	SR 472 – Deltona, DeLand	Access to Halifax Health UF Health - Medical Center of Deltona
Volusia	Lake Helen	115.898	186.520	55	116	CR 4116 – DeLand, Lake Helen Historic District	
Volusia	DeLand	118.456	190.636	56	118A-B	SR 44 – New Smyrna Beach, DeLand Historic District	Signed as exits 118A (east) and 118B (west)
Volusia	Daytona Beach	129.131	207.816	57	129	US 92 east – Daytona Beach	Eastbound exit and westbound entrance; access to Daytona Beach International Airport and Halifax Health Medical Center
Volusia	Daytona Beach	131.987– 132.298	212.412– 212.913	58	132A	SR 400 east – South Daytona	Eastern end of SR 400 concurrency; eastbound exit and westbound left entrance; exit 260A on I-95
Volusia	Daytona Beach	131.987– 132.298	212.412– 212.913	—	132B	I-95 / US 92 – Jacksonville, Miami	Eastern terminus; exit number is for I-95 south; exit 260B on I-95; US 92 access is part of exit 260C on I-95
1.000 mi = 1.609 km; 1.000 km = 0.621 mi: Closed/former; Concurrency terminus; Electronic toll collection; Incomplete access; Unopened

== State Road 400 ==
State Road 400
- Location: Tampa–Daytona Beach
- Length: 136.514 mi (219.698 km)

State Road 400 (SR 400) is an unsigned highway while running concurrently with I-4 from their shared western terminus at I-275 in Tampa through the last eastbound exit before the eastern terminus of I-4, at I-95 near Daytona Beach. SR 400 is named Beville Road beyond I-95 and continues for another 4.216 mi (6.785 km) to its own eastern terminus at an intersection with US 1 on the city line between Daytona Beach and South Daytona. Sections of the nonconcurrent SR 400 are classified as a "scenic thoroughfare" within Daytona Beach.

=== Major intersections ===
County	Location	mi	km	Destinations	Notes
Overlap with I-4 until exit 132A
Volusia	Daytona Beach	0.000	0.000	I-4 west	Eastern end of I-4 concurrency; eastbound left exit and westbound entrance; exit 132A on I-4
Volusia	Daytona Beach	0.000	0.000	I-95 – Jacksonville, Miami	Westbound exit and eastbound entrance; eastbound access via I-4; exit 260A on I-95
Volusia	Daytona Beach	0.271	0.436	CR 4009 (South Williamson Boulevard) – Daytona Beach International Airport, Daytona International Speedway	
Volusia	Daytona Beach	2.181	3.510	SR 483 north (South Clyde Morris Boulevard) CR 483 south (South Clyde Morris Boulevard)	
Volusia	Daytona Beach–South Daytona line	2.852	4.590	SR 5A (Nova Road) – Museum, Bethune Cookman University	
Volusia	Daytona Beach–South Daytona line	4.216	6.785	US 1 (South Ridgewood Avenue) – Daytona Beach, South Daytona, Convention Center	Eastern terminus
Volusia	Daytona Beach–South Daytona line	4.216	6.785	Beville Road east	One-way street, outbound access only; continuation beyond US 1
1.000 mi = 1.609 km; 1.000 km = 0.621 mi: Concurrency terminus; Incomplete access

Browse numbered routes
← SR 399	SR 400	→ SR 401

=== State Road 400F ===
State Road 400F
- Location: Plant City
- Length: 8.965 mi (14.428 km)

State Road 400F, known locally as both North Frontage Road and South Frontage Road, are a pair of bi-directional frontage roads for I-4 (SR 400) in unincorporated Hillsborough County, mostly in Plant City. South Frontage Road's western terminus is at SR 39A (Paul Buchman Highway/North Wheeler Street) and runs for 4.474 miles (7.200 km) to County Line Road. North Frontage Road's western terminus is at South Frontage Road, where it passes under I-4 and runs 4.491 miles (7.228 km) to Swindell Road.

== In politics ==
Combined presidential election results of I-4 counties, 1992–2024
Year	Democrat	Republican	Other
2024	47.3% 1,124,195	51.1% 1,213,479	1.09% 36,747
2020	52.3% 1,276,840	46.7% 1,139,924	1.09% 26,658
2016	50.6% 1,289,387	44.7% 1,161,468	3.68% 95,768
2012	52.6% 953,186	46.2% 838,377	1.2% 21,907
2008	53.3% 946,929	45.7% 811,159	1.0% 17,034
2004	46.5% 724,618	52.9% 824,887	0.6% 9,929
2000	48.0% 569,746	49.7% 590,030	2.2% 26,531
1996	45.7% 462,403	44.7% 451,902	9.6% 96,818
1992	37.5% 379,821	42.1% 426,297	20.3% 205,621

In the 2004 US presidential election in Florida, the I-4 corridor, a commonly used term to refer to the counties in which I-4 runs through and a site of significant population growth, was a focus of political activity within the swing state. Communities along the I-4 corridor were perceived by both major political parties as having higher proportions of undecided voters as compared to more Republican- or Democratic-leaning portions of the state. It played an equally key role in the 2008 US presidential election in Florida, but the corridor voted heavily for George W. Bush in 2004, which helped Bush win the state. In 2008, it swung behind Democratic candidate Barack Obama, helping Obama win Florida.

Between 1996 and 2012, the I-4 corridor voted for the statewide winner. However, in the 2016 and 2020 elections, Republican Donald Trump carried the state without winning the region. The Republicans carried the region three times while the Democrats carried the region five times in the past eight presidential elections. Republicans George H. W. Bush and George W. Bush won more votes than other candidates in 1992, 2000, and 2004, while Democrats Bill Clinton, Barack Obama, Hillary Clinton, and Joe Biden captured the region's vote total in the elections of 1996, 2008, 2012, 2016, and 2020.

Trump again won the 2024 United States presidential election in Florida. WKMG-TV reported that because of the size of his victory of more than 13%, Florida was no longer a swing state. Noting that Trump had won all nine central Florida counties except Orange County, the station said that "the days of the [political] I-4 corridor being a thing [are] no more".

== See also ==
- War on I-4 – The college rivalry between the University of South Florida and University of Central Florida.
- Hurricane Donna (1960) – A category 4 hurricane that tracked directly over I-4.
- Hurricane Charley (2004) – Another category 4 hurricane that tracked directly over I-4 and is sometimes referred to as the "I-4 Hurricane"
- Hurricane Ian (2022) – A third category 4 hurricane that tracked close to I-4.
