= George Benz =

American football coach

Biographical details
- Born: September 6, 1917; Bronx, New York, U.S.
- Died: June 2, 2007 (aged 89); South Daytona, Florida, U.S.

Coaching career (HC unless noted)
- 1949–1950: Hartwick
- 1951–1954: Norwich

Head coaching record
- Overall: 19–28–1

George "Duke" Benz (September 6, 1917 – June 23, 2007) was an American college football coach. He served as the head football coach at Hartwick College in Oneonta, New York from 1949 to 1950 and at Norwich University in Norwich, Vermont from 1951 to 1954, compiling a career head coaching record of 19–28–1.
