= Central Polk Parkway =

State Road 570B
- Central Polk Parkway
- Map of the Central Polk Parkway

Route information
- Maintained by FTX
- History: Revived in 2018

Major junctions
- South end: SR 570 in Winter Haven
- North end: I-4 in Davenport

Location
- Country: United States
- State: Florida
- Counties: Polk

Highway system
- Florida State Highway System; Interstate; US; State; Former; Pre‑1945; Toll; Scenic
| ← SR 570 | → SR 573 |

The Central Polk Parkway, also known as State Road 570B (SR 570B), is a proposed controlled-access toll road in Polk County, Florida. The proposed road is actually two separate roads—called legs by the Florida Department of Transportation (FDOT). The western segment will connect the Polk Parkway with SR 60 between Bartow and Lake Wales. The eastern leg will start a few miles east of SR 60 and run north, parallel to US Highway 27 (US 27), and terminate at Interstate 4 (I-4) north of Davenport. The most recent, and viable, proposed routing will connect the two legs together near the CSX Intermodal Facility south of Wahneta. In December 2015, FDOT announced the cancellation of any further work on the project, citing insufficient funds (a $1 billion shortfall) and low traffic volume. The project continued to have the support of the local business community and local politicians, however, and it was revived in 2018.

== History ==
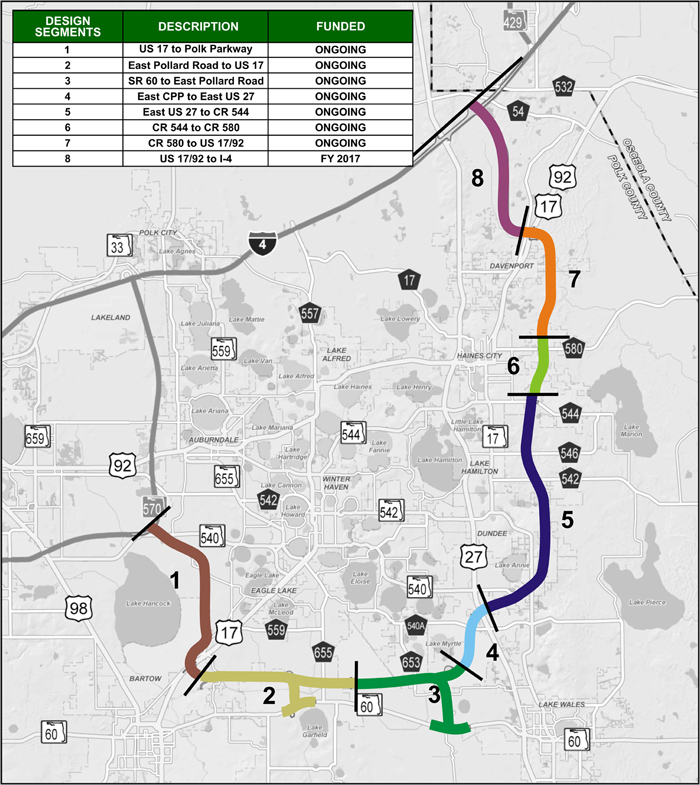
Funding status of design phase (as of 2014)

The Central Polk Parkway had its beginnings in another proposed road project, the controversial Heartland Parkway, which was proposed to connect the Lakeland area with Fort Myers. It would have run 150 miles (240 km) through undeveloped land in the Florida Heartland. This proposal was supported by former governor Jeb Bush, but his successor Charlie Crist criticized the idea due primarily to environmental concerns. The northernmost segment of the Heartland Parkway segment in Polk County has been dubbed as "the fish hook" by proponents of the project. According to feasibility studies on various east–west and north–south routes throughout the state by the Florida's Turnpike Enterprise, the route from State Road 60 to the Polk Parkway was the only feasible route, meaning it would be supported by tolls alone. Further studies were funded and the project is currently past the initial planning stages.

=== Needs ===
The Central Polk Parkway fulfills a number of needs in Polk County, according to the FDOT and the road's proponents:

- It will act as a beltway around the City of Winter Haven, providing easy freeway access to the Polk Parkway and I-4.
- The planned CSX freight terminal off of US 27 in Winter Haven was supposed to have created substantial truck traffic, and the proposed road would have helped keep these trucks off of local roads.
- The Clear Springs development in Bartow will double or triple Bartow's population in the next 20 years, increasing traffic substantially on SR 60 and US 17.
- The construction of Legoland Florida on the site of the old Cypress Gardens will bring added traffic to the area.
- The road would have reduced traffic on SR 60, US 17 and US 27.
- New development in Polk County, particularly Ranches at Lake Macleod, Sutton Preserve, Harmony at Lake Eloise, Villamar, Forest Lake Townhouses, and more future development areas, in Eagle Lake, Wahneta, and Bartow.
- The road would decrease traffic on existing local roads such as SR/CR 557, which currently includes a high traffic volume per day, at 27,000 cars per day., and other roads such as US 27, US 17, US 92.
- This road will be useful as a way to bypass the US 27, and SR/CR 557 interchange, and divert traffic to avoid causing congestion on the current interchanges.

=== Revival ===
The project was revived in early 2018, and a preliminary design was released in June 2019. Construction began on the segment of Central Polk Parkway from Polk Parkway at the SR 540 interchange to a new interchange with US 17 (SR 35). Another section of the expressway is in design spanning from US 17 (SR 35) to SR 60 ending at an interchange with SR 60 at Connersville Road.

== See also ==
- Polk Parkway
- Heartland Parkway
