= Florida State Road 570 =

Highway in Florida

State Road 570
- Polk Parkway
- SR 570 highlighted in red

Route information
- Maintained by Florida's Turnpike Enterprise
- Length: 24.380 mi (39.236 km)
- Existed: December 12, 1999–present

Major junctions
- West end: I-4 in Lakeland
- US 98 near Highland City; SR 540 near Auburndale; US 92 in Auburndale
- East end: I-4 in Polk City

Location
- Country: United States
- State: Florida
- Counties: Polk

Highway system
- Florida State Highway System; Interstate; US; State; Former; Pre‑1945; Toll; Scenic
← SR 569	→ SR 570B

State Road 570 (SR 570), also known as the Polk Parkway, is a 24-mile (39 km) controlled-access toll road that runs through Polk County, Florida. It is operated as part of Florida's Turnpike Enterprise system of tolled freeways. The Polk Parkway mainly serves as a beltway around Lakeland forming a semicircle, which along with I-4 circumscribes most of the city limits of Lakeland.

As part of Florida's Turnpike network, SunPass, E-Pass, and LeeWay electronic toll collection were recognized along with coin collection at toll plazas and interchange ramps. The Polk Parkway didn't, however, employ open road tolling like numerous other toll roads in Florida until on September 23, 2022, at 8:00 pm, when it went to all-electronic tolling, like the other toll roads within the network.

== Route description ==
SR 570 provides easier access to I-4 from Polk County cities Lakeland, Winter Haven, Bartow, Mulberry, and Auburndale, as well as providing quick routes from city to city. The road is signed east–west, although the section from SR 540 (exit 14) to the eastern I-4 junction runs nearly south to north. The control cities for the highway's signage are Tampa (westbound) and Orlando (eastbound). The Polk Parkway is a four lane divided expressway for most of its length, although between Old Dixie Highway (Exit 18) and 0.5-mile (0.80 km) south of Pace Road (exit 23), the highway is a two-lane expressway, with one lane in each direction. As of 2015, the toll is $1.25 cash or $1.06 with SunPass at the three mainline toll plazas and $0.00-0.75 cash or $0.00-$0.53 with SunPass at junctions. The maximum toll for any trip along the Polk Parkway is $3.75 cash or $3.18 with SunPass.

The Polk Parkway begins at Interstate 4 near the Hillsborough-Polk County line west of Lakeland. Until reaching Harden Boulevard (exit 5), the Polk Parkway passes through mostly undeveloped land. Just east of Airport Road (exit 3), the highway passes a large building with a green glass facade, which is the corporate headquarters for Publix Supermarkets. Before reaching exit 4, the highway runs a half mile northeast of Lakeland Linder International Airport—a large general aviation airport—passing beneath the path of air traffic on Runway 5/23. Between Harden Boulevard (exit 5) and South Florida Avenue (exit 7), the Polk Parkway was built along the alignment of Drane Field Road, which is now truncated at Harden Boulevard and continues to South Florida Avenue as frontage roads along the Polk Parkway. The first mainline toll plaza is located between South Florida Avenue and Lakeland Highlands Road. The eastbound exit and westbound entrance at SR 540 (exit 14) are located at the Central Toll Plaza. After crossing De Castro Road, the Polk Parkway curves to the north, passing the only operating landfill in Polk County. Along the curve is the westbound exit and eastbound entrance of the SR 540 junction, which is the location of the planned interchange with the future Central Polk Parkway. The Polk Parkway continues north for the remainder of its length. A 4 mi (6.4 km) segment between Old Dixie Highway and Pace Road is a two-lane highway; the only overpass along this segment was built to accommodate a second carriageway west of the current highway. About midway between Old Dixie Highway and Pace Road is the Eastern Toll Plaza. The Pace Road interchange collects tolls with SunPass only and was added to the highway in 2011 to provide access to Florida Polytechnic University, located on the southwest corner of the I-4/Polk Parkway interchange.

== History ==
Original sign for the Polk Parkway, using a green background.

The Polk Parkway was originally conceived in the 1950s as a circumferential route around Lakeland, and after several delays in planning due to funding shortfalls, it was revived as the Imperial Parkway by the Polk County Commission in 1986. Due to the delays, a proposal in the 1970s/1980s that would have connected the parkway with the Lee Roy Selmon Expressway never came to fruition. In the spring of 1990, the Florida Legislature led by Senate leader and Winter Haven resident Bob Crawford, incorporated the Polk Parkway into the Turnpike Expansion Program, a part of Senate Bill 1316.

The Parkway's groundbreaking was on January 25, 1996. The western 7.5 miles (12.1 km) of the Parkway opened to traffic on August 9, 1998. The central section, approximately 10 miles (16 km) in length, opened to traffic on 2 August 1999. The easternmost 7.5 miles (12.1 km) of road opened to traffic on 12 December 1999, completing the highway at a cost of $490 million.

In the late summer of 2009, the Turnpike began widening the Polk Parkway from Interstate 4 at Polk City south to Pace Road from two lanes to four lanes. This $48 million design-build project includes construction of a SunPass-only interchange at Pace Road (exit 23), featuring a modified cloverleaf design, with a 25 cent toll for the to-and-from the east (north) movement. The to-and-from the west (south) movement is not tolled as there is a mainline plaza to the west where the toll will be collected. The interchange opened on November 10, 2011, providing access to the new Florida Polytechnic University campus. The project is a public-private partnership between the Florida Department of Transportation—Florida’s Turnpike Enterprise, USF Polytechnic, the Polk County Board of County Commissioners and The Williams Company.

The 1998 Florida Legislature designated the western 7 miles (11 km) of the Polk Parkway (between Interstate 4 and South Florida Avenue (State Road 37) as the James Henry Mills Medal of Honor Parkway. Mills was the only native of Polk County to receive a medal of honor in World War II, in recognition of his heroic actions in Cisterna, Italy.

== Future ==
The Polk Parkway has become an important part of Polk County's transportation infrastructure as traffic has increased in the growing county.

There have been several plans presented to the public regarding a proposed Heartland Parkway which would be a roughly 110-mile (180 km) parkway extending from the Polk Parkway to Southwest Florida near Ft. Myers.

There has also been a proposal to construct an extension from the Polk Parkway encircling Winter Haven and connecting with I-4 near the Polk-Osceola county line. Another proposed parkway would connect the southeast corner of the Polk Parkway with State Road 60 east of Lake Wales. These will be realized as the Central Polk Parkway (SR 570B), which is currently in the design phase.

== Exit list ==
The entire route is in Polk County.

Location	mi	km	Exit	Destinations	Notes
Lakeland	0.000	0.000	–	I-4 – Orlando, Tampa	Exit 27 on I-4 (SR 400)
Lakeland	0.534	0.859	1	Clark Road to US 92 / CR 542	Westbound exit and eastbound entrance
Lakeland	2.851	4.588	3	SR 572 (Airport Road)	Tolled eastbound exit and westbound entrance; To Lakeland Linder International Airport
Lakeland	4.133	6.651	4	Waring Road to SR 572 (Drane Field Road)	Tolled eastbound exit and westbound entrance
Lakeland	5.551	8.933	5	SR 563 (Harden Boulevard)	Tolled eastbound exit and westbound entrance
Lakeland	6.683	10.755	7	SR 37 (South Florida Avenue)	Tolled eastbound exit and westbound entrance
Lakeland	8.1	13.0	Western Toll Gantry		
Lakeland	8.727	14.045	9	CR 37B (Lakeland Highlands Road)	Tolled westbound exit and eastbound entrance
	10.143	16.324	10	US 98 – Lakeland, Bartow	Unsigned SR 35 / SR 700
	12.6	20.3	Central Toll Gantry		
	13.918	22.399	14A	SR 540 (Winter Lake Road)	Serves Winter Haven and Legoland Florida
	14.678	23.622	14B	SR 570B (Central Polk Parkway)	Under construction
	15.5	24.9	Winter Lake Toll Gantry		
Auburndale	17.291	27.827	17	US 92 – Lakeland, Auburndale	Unsigned SR 600
Auburndale	18.645	30.006	18	CR 546 (Old Dixie Highway)	Tolled eastbound exit and westbound entrance
	20.1	32.3	Eastern Toll Gantry		
	20.6	33.2	20	Braddock Road	Electronic toll collection; tolled southbound exit and northbound entrance; opened on March 28, 2024
Lakeland	23.00	37.01	23	Pace Road	Electronic toll collection interchange; to Florida Polytechnic University
Lakeland–Polk City line	24.380	39.236	24	I-4 east – Orlando	Exit 41 on I-4 (SR 400)
Lakeland–Polk City line	24.380	39.236	–	I-4 west – Tampa	Exit 41 on I-4 (SR 400)
1.000 mi = 1.609 km; 1.000 km = 0.621 mi: Electronic toll collection; Incomplete access
