= PICO Building (Sanford, Florida) =

- U.S. Historic district – Contributing property
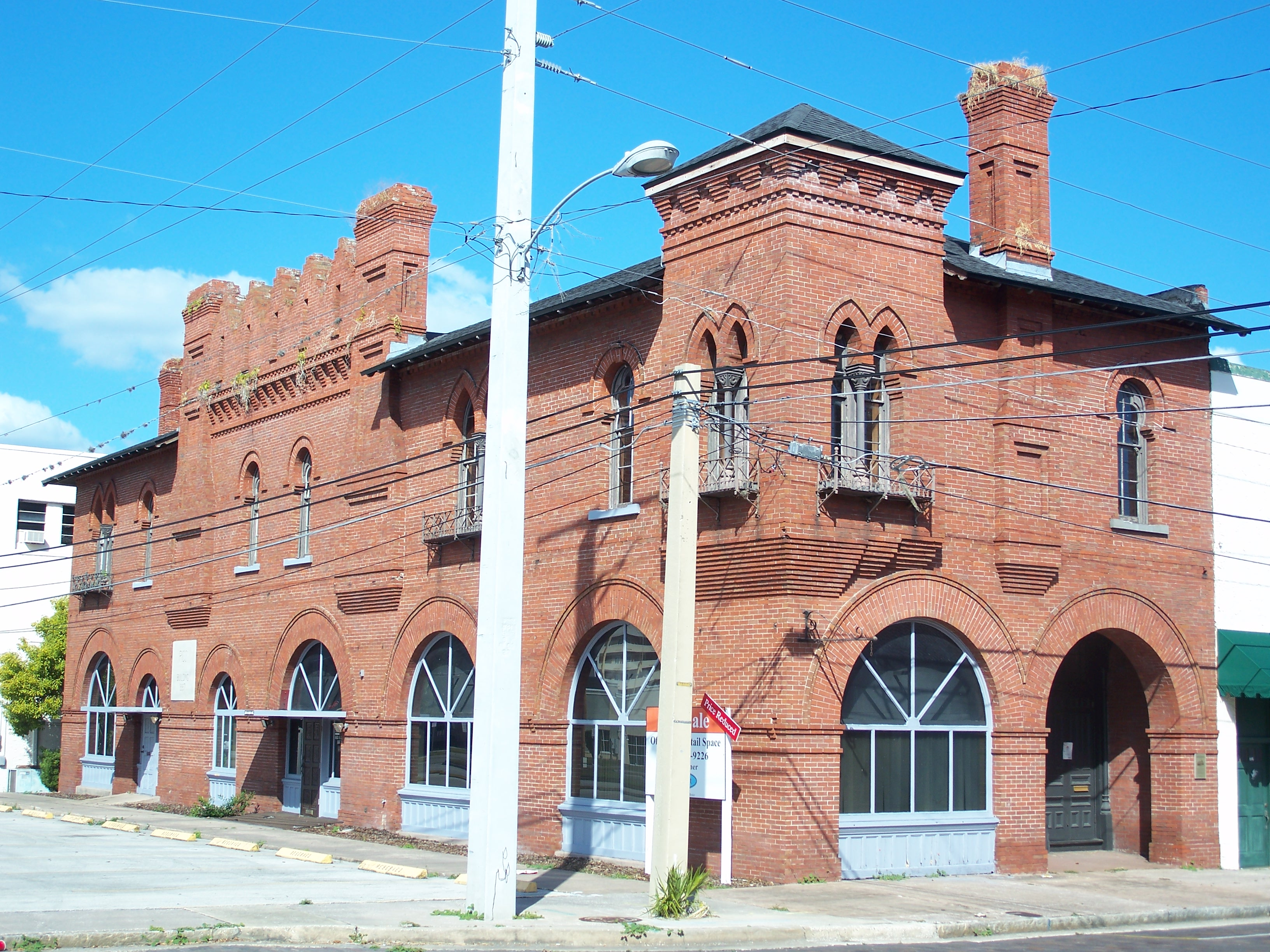
- PICO Building, 2010

- Location within Florida Location within the United States
- Location: 209 North Oak Ave; Sanford, Florida, United States
- Coordinates: 28°48′42″N 81°16′3″W
- Built: 1886
- Built by: H. M. Papworth Construction Co.
- Architect: William T. Cotter
- Architectural style: Romanesque Revival, Moorish Revival
- Part of: Sanford Commercial District (ID76000606)

PICO Building
- Interactive map of the PICO Building area

General information
- Construction started: 1886
- Completed: 1887
- Client: Henry B. Plant of Plant Investment Co. (PLICO)

The PICO Building, also known as the PICO Hotel, is an historic 2-story redbrick building located at 209 North Oak Avenue, corner of West Commercial Street, in Sanford, Florida. Built during 1886–1887 for Henry B. Plant of Plant Investment Co. (PICO) to serve travelers arriving in Sanford on his railroad and steamship lines, it was designed by local architect William T. Cotter in the Romanesque Revival and Moorish Revival styles of architecture and built by the H. M. Papworth Construction Company. In 1906, the building was remodeled and sold to the Takach family, who had operated the restaurant for Plant by Bertha E. Takach and family, Hungarian immigrants.

According to the Orlando Sentinel on April 22, 1973, "Mrs. Takch, the owner (of an adjacent restaurant), had such good food... she got all the customers. So, in 1889, Mr. Plant, whose dining room was losing out, made a deal with Mr. and Mrs. G. L. Takach to take over their Pico Hotel." In fact, "they DID, in 1891...from that time, many called the Pico Hotel the Takach Hotel. It had gas lights, white table cloths, and the people who ate there were well dressed, as train travelers always were in that era."

"Their restaurant continued in the building for about 50 years. The building's original onion dome was destroyed in a 1950s storm. The building then went on to become an office building used primarily for law offices.

In 1989, it was listed in A Guide to Florida's Historic Architecture prepared by the Florida Association of the American Institute of Architects and published by the University of Florida Press.

The building is a contributing property in the Sanford Commercial District, which was added to the National Register of Historic Places on June 15, 1976.
