= Florida State Road 572 =

Highway in Florida, United States

State Road 572
- Airport Road, Drane Field Road

Route information
- Maintained by FDOT
- Length: 4.674 mi (7.522 km)

Major junctions
- West end: US 92 / North Galloway Road in Lakeland
- SR 570 in Lakeland
- East end: Pipkin Creek Road / South Parkway Frontage Road in Lakeland

Location
- Country: United States
- State: Florida
- Counties: Polk

Highway system
- Florida State Highway System; Interstate; US; State; Former; Pre‑1945; Toll; Scenic
| ← SR 570 | → SR 573 |

State Road 572 (SR 572) is a 4.674-mile-long (7.522 km) state highway in Polk County, Florida, that runs from U.S. Route 92 (US 92) and North Galloway Road (CR 542A) in western Lakeland to Pipkin Creek Road and South Parkway Frontage Road. The road runs in an L-shape with its east–west leg running generally parallel to SR 570 (Polk Parkway).

Prior to the construction of SR 570, SR 572 continued east to SR 37 bringing its mileage to 6.525 miles (10.501 km).

== Major intersections ==
The entire route is in Polk County.

| Location | mi | km | Destinations | Notes |
|---|---|---|---|---|
| Lakeland | 0.000 | 0.000 | US 92 (New Tampa Highway / SR 600) / North Galloway Road | Western terminus; continues as North Galloway Road (CR 542A) beyond US 92 |
| | 0.379 | 0.610 | CR 542 (Old Tampa Highway) | hidden CR 542A begins |
| Lakeland | 1.886– 1.947 | 3.035– 3.133 | SR 570 (Polk Parkway) – Tampa, Auburndale | SR 570 exit 3 |
| Lakeland | 4.674 | 7.522 | Pipkin Creek Road / South Parkway Frontage Road (SR 570F east) to SR 570 (Polk Parkway) | Eastern terminus; continues as South Parkway Frontage Road beyond Pipkin Creek Road |
1.000 mi = 1.609 km; 1.000 km = 0.621 mi
