= James Henry Mills =

American Medal of Honour recipient in WW2

- Born: May 2, 1923; Fort Meade, Florida, U.S.
- Died: November 11, 1973 (aged 50); Gainesville, Florida, U.S.
- Burial place: Oak Hill Burial Park Cemetery, Lakeland, Florida
- Military career
- Allegiance: United States of America
- Branch: United States Army
- Rank: Corporal
- Units: 15th Infantry, 3rd Infantry Division
- Conflicts: World War II
- Awards: Medal of Honor

James Henry Mills (May 2, 1923 – November 11, 1973) was an American Medal of Honor recipient. He was the only Polk County, Florida native to receive the Medal of Honor in World War II. He joined the Army from his birth city in September 1943. Private Mills earned the Medal of Honor in 1944 for demonstrating "conspicuous gallantry and intrepidity at the risk of his life above and beyond the call of duty." Mills actions allowed his platoon to take its objective without casualties.

Mills died at the hands of a thief posing as a stranded motorist, whom Mills had stopped to assist, near Gainesville, Florida on November 11, 1973. He was laid to rest at Oak Hill Burial Park Cemetery in Lakeland, Florida.

== Medal of Honor citation ==
Rank and organization: Private, U.S. Army, Company F, 15th Infantry, 3rd Infantry Division.

Place and date: Near Cisterna di Littoria, Italy, May 24, 1944.

Citation:

For conspicuous gallantry and intrepidity at risk of life above and beyond the call of duty. Pvt. Mills, undergoing his baptism of fire, preceded his platoon down a draw to reach a position from which an attack could be launched against a heavily fortified strongpoint. After advancing about 300 yards, Pvt. Mills was fired on by a machinegun only 5 yards distant. He killed the gunner with 1 shot and forced the surrender of the assistant gunner. Continuing his advance, he saw a German soldier in a camouflaged position behind a large bush pulling the pin of a potato-masher grenade. Covering the German with his rifle, Pvt. Mills forced him to drop the grenade and captured him. When another enemy soldier attempted to throw a hand grenade into the draw, Pvt. Mills killed him with 1 shot. Brought under fire by a machinegun, 2 machine pistols, and 3 rifles at a range of only 50 feet, he charged headlong into the furious chain of automatic fire shooting his M 1 from the hip. The enemy was completely demoralized by Pvt. Mills' daring charge, and when he reached a point within 10 feet of their position, all 6 surrendered. As he neared the end of the draw, Pvt. Mills was brought under fire by a machinegunner 20 yards distant. Despite the fact that he had absolutely no cover, Pvt. Mills killed the gunner with 1 shot. Two enemy soldiers near the machinegunner fired wildly at Pvt. Mills and then fled. Pvt. Mills fired twice, killing 1 of the enemy. Continuing on to the position, he captured a fourth soldier. When it became apparent that an assault on the strongpoint would in all probability cause heavy casualties on the platoon, Pvt. Mills volunteered to cover the advance down a shallow ditch to a point within 50 yards of the objective. Standing on the bank in full view of the enemy less than 100 yards away, he shouted and fired his rifle directly into the position. His ruse worked exactly as planned. The enemy centered his fire on Pvt. Mills. Tracers passed within inches of his body, rifle and machine pistol bullets ricocheted off the rocks at his feet. Yet he stood there firing until his rifle was empty. Intent on covering the movement of his platoon, Pvt. Mills jumped into the draw, reloaded his weapon, climbed out again, and continued to lay down a base of fire. Repeating this action 4 times, he enabled his platoon to reach the designated spot undiscovered, from which position it assaulted and overwhelmed the enemy, capturing 22 Germans and taking the objective without casualties.

== Awards and decorations ==

Badge	Combat Infantryman Badge		
1st row	Medal of Honor		
2nd row	Bronze Star Medal	Purple Heart	Army Good Conduct Medal
3rd row	American Campaign Medal	European–African–Middle Eastern Campaign Medal with 1 Campaign star	World War II Victory Medal

== Memorials ==
- James Henry Mills Medal of Honor Parkway, a section of SR 570 in Lakeland, Florida
- James H. Mills Memorial at Veterans Memorial Park in Lakeland, Florida.

== See also ==
- List of Medal of Honor recipients
