= Lake Helen Historic District =

District in Lake Helen, Florida, US

- U.S. National Register of Historic Places
- U.S. Historic district
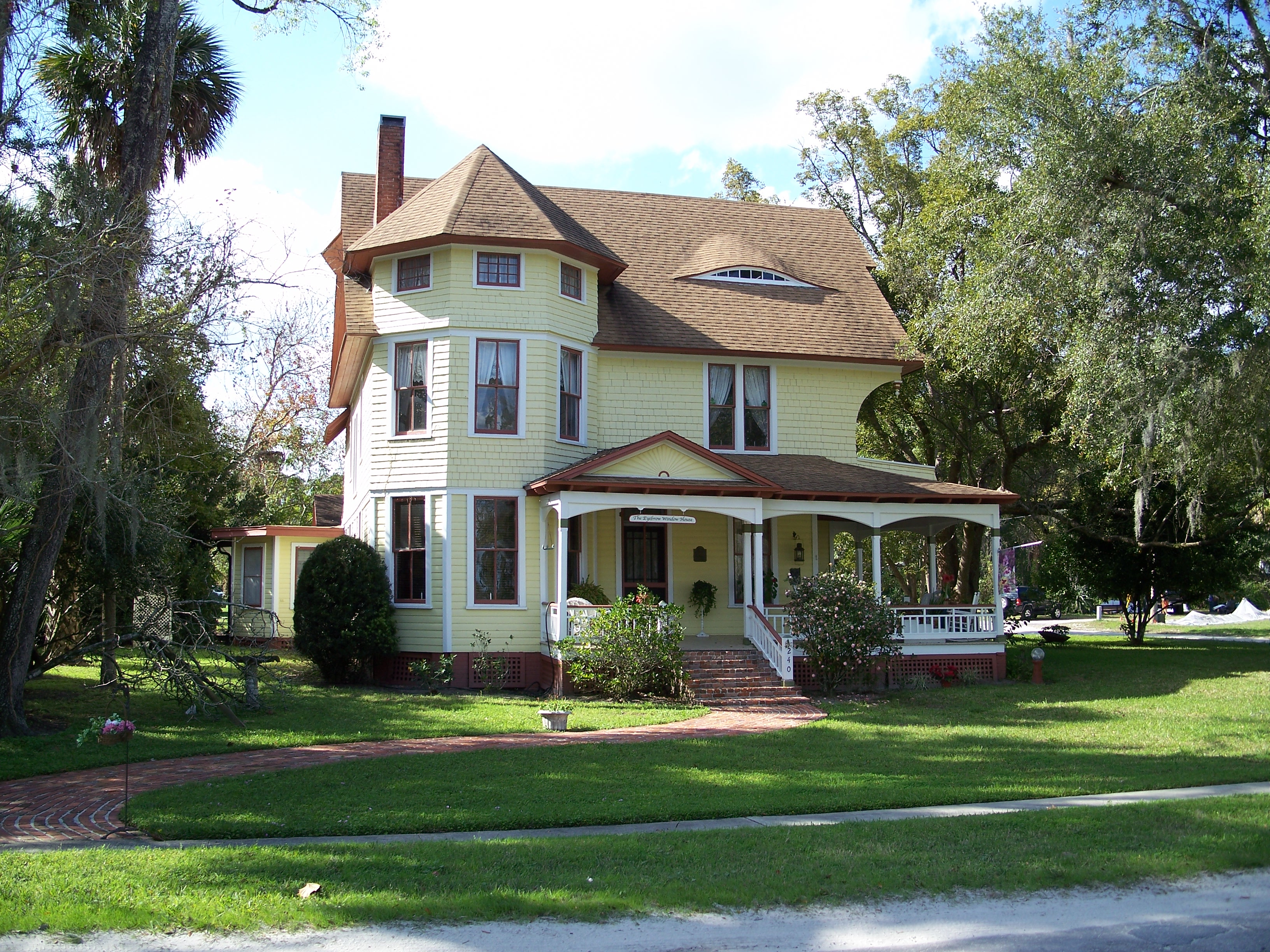
- House in the Lake Helen Historic District

- Location within Volusia County
- Location: Lake Helen, Florida United States
- Coordinates: 28°59′18″N 81°14′3″W
- Area: 350 acres (1.4 km^{2})
- NRHP reference No.: 93000981
- Added to NRHP: September 16, 1993

The Lake Helen Historic District is a U.S. historic district (designated as such on September 16, 1993) located in Lake Helen, Florida. The district is bounded by West New York, Lakeview, Park and Euclid Avenues. It contains 71 historic buildings.
