= Bonnet Springs Park =

168-acre public park in Lakeland, Florida, United States

- Interactive map of Bonnet Springs Park
- Type: Public park
- Location: 400 Bonnet Springs Blvd, Lakeland, Florida, U.S.
- Coordinates: 28.046044°N 81.967503°W
- Area: 168 acres (68 ha)
- Opened: October 2022
- Operator: Bonnet Springs Park Foundation, Inc.
- Open: Year round
- Status: Open
- Website: bonnetspringspark.com

Bonnet Springs Park is a 168-acre public park in Lakeland, Florida. The park is on the site of a former CSX railroad yard. The park was designed by the landscape architecture firm Sasaki and opened in October 2022. It is operated by the Bonnet Springs Park Foundation. Carol Jenkins Barnett provided significant early funding for the park.

== History ==
The site of Bonnet Springs Park was once home to one of Florida's largest railroad facilities. The Lakeland railyard, operated by CSX Transportation, served as a transportation hub at its peak, handling approximately 25 trains per day. The facility closed in 1952. The railroad's operations saturated the soil with arsenic-based herbicides, among other industrial byproducts. Following the rail yard closure, the site was abandoned, accumulating garbage and becoming an encampment for homeless people.

In the early 2010s, Lakeland civic leaders, philanthropists, and former park professionals acquired the former rail yard and surrounding properties to develop a public park. Carol Jenkins Barnett, who served as president of Publix Super Markets Charities from 1991 to 2016, provided funding for the park before her death in 2021. Barney Barnett, David Bunch, and Bill Tinsley were others involved in the park's founding. In 2017, the Bonnet Springs Park Foundation hired Sasaki to develop a master plan for the park. Sasaki conducted a six-month community engagement process. The remediation of the former railyard presented a challenge with 300,000 cubic yards (230,000 m^{3}) of arsenic-contaminated soil and an estimated 37 short tons (74,000 lb) of accumulated garbage. Rather than removing the contaminated soil from the site, Sasaki's design team incorporated remediation into the park's design. The contaminated material was sculpted into two hills, then capped with two feet of clean soil. Additional restoration included planting 3,000 trees and the protection of 30 acres of wetlands. The park's stormwater infrastructure voluntarily treats runoff before it enters nearby Lake Bonnet. Bonnet Springs Park opened to the public in October 2022. In 2025, it received a state grant to expand the parking lots.

== Park features ==
Bonnet Springs Park is open daily. The park reports approximately one million visitors annually. One of the park's attractions is the Crenshaw Canopy Walk, an elevated walkway that runs through the tree canopy. Other attractions are Harrell Family Botanical Gardens and Greenhouse and the Florida Children's Museum. The park also includes a tram that operates during peak hours, a butterfly house, treehouse playground, outdoor amphitheater, six miles of walking and nature trails, an event lawn, and boating access. There is a restaurant and a rooftop garden bar.

== Events and programs ==
There are flower festival events at the park. The park also hosts different cultural events, including Hispanic Heritage month.

The park hosts "Light Up BSP," an annual free holiday lights event. In 2025, the event was postponed because of traffic and parking issues. The event is expect to return in 2026.

In December 2025, BSP hosted a walk to raise money for Alzheimer's disease.

Bonnet Springs Park operates education programs for children and families, including: StoryWalk, an outdoor reading program integrated into the trail system, Play & Learn, nature-based play programming for children, and field trips. There are STEM programs.

== Recognition ==
- Best City Park by USA Today (2025)
- American Society of Landscape Architects (ASLA) – Recognized for landscape architecture excellence

== See also ==
- Brownfield land
