= Heartland Parkway =

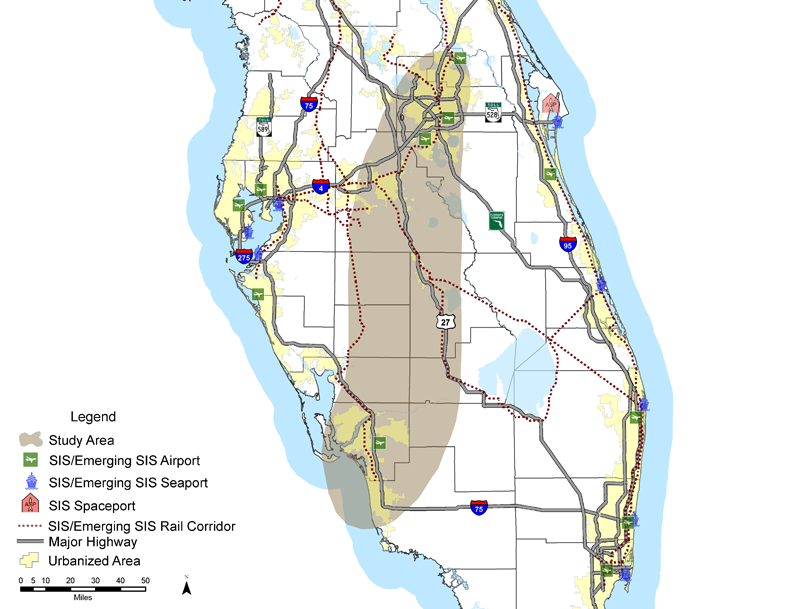
- Corridor study area for the proposed Heartland Parkway in 2006-2007

Location
- Country: United States
- State: Florida

Highway system
- Florida State Highway System; Interstate; US; State; Former; Pre‑1945; Toll; Scenic

Heartland Parkway was a planned controlled-access toll road consisting of approximately 110–150 miles (180–240 km) from Interstate 4 near the Polk-Osceola County line in central Florida to the Fort Myers–Naples area of southwest Florida, through rural portions of Polk, Hardee, Highlands, DeSoto, Glades, Lee, and possibly Collier counties. The proposed corridor has been in planning since 2006 with the project revived and abandoned multiple times until its most recent abandonment in 2021.

== Background ==
The mention of building a "Heartland Parkway" route spans several decades. Between 2006-2007, preliminary planning and corridor studies were performed by Florida Department of Transportation (FDOT) and the Florida's Turnpike Enterprise in Central Florida to evaluate interregional toll routes. The studies consisted of Heartland Parkway, Polk Parkway Southeast Extension, and the Coast to Coast toll road. Alligator Alley and several two-lane rural roads can transport millions of people living in Collier, Lee, and Charlotte counties away from the Gulf coast.

As of 2023, the only viable north–south trucking route away from the east coast is U.S. Highway 27. In Polk County, that highway is seen as the deadliest road in the county in part due to the large volume of truck traffic and high speeds. Its popularity amongst truckers stems from its intersections with several major highways and its avoidance of major cities.

The Heartland Environmental Agricultural Rural Task Force (HEART), an organization representing landowners pushing for the construction of the Heartland Parkway, has put forth some studies that they believe necessitate the construction of such a parkway. Some of the key points from the 2006-2007 studies included:

- The total volume of freight moving to, from, and within Florida is anticipated to grow from 847 million tons to 1.5 billion tons over the next 25 years.
- The population growth of Florida is projected to increase south of Interstate 4 by six million people over the next 25 years.
- An estimated 1.5 million people are expected to move into the Heartland Corridor Region (Hendry, Glades, Highlands, DeSoto, Hardee, Northeast Collier and Polk counties).
- In the next 25 years, the number of out-of-state and international visitors to Florida is anticipated to grow from 84 million to 146 million visitors per year.

== Criticism ==
Support for the construction of the parkway has ebbed and flowed. Former Florida governor Jeb Bush was a proponent of this parkway, but his successor, governor Charlie Crist never expressed interest in its creation. Criticism for the proposed parkway has largely stemmed from concern of the environmentally sensitive areas and concern that rural areas it would traverse would be exploited by developers.

A major proponent of the Heartland Parkway was J. D. Alexander, a state legislator from 1998 to 2012, from eastern Polk County. Until 2012, Alexander was CEO of Atlantic Blue Group, which owns tens of thousands of acres of property along or near the proposed alignment. In his final year in office (due to term limits) and while Alexander was chairman of the Senate Budget Committee, a total of $34.7 million was allocated for the parkway in the state's 2012 and 2014 budgets despite no request from the Florida Department of Transportation.
