= Tampa Executive Airport =

Airport in Tampa, Florida, US

Tampa Executive Airport (formerly Vandenberg Airport)
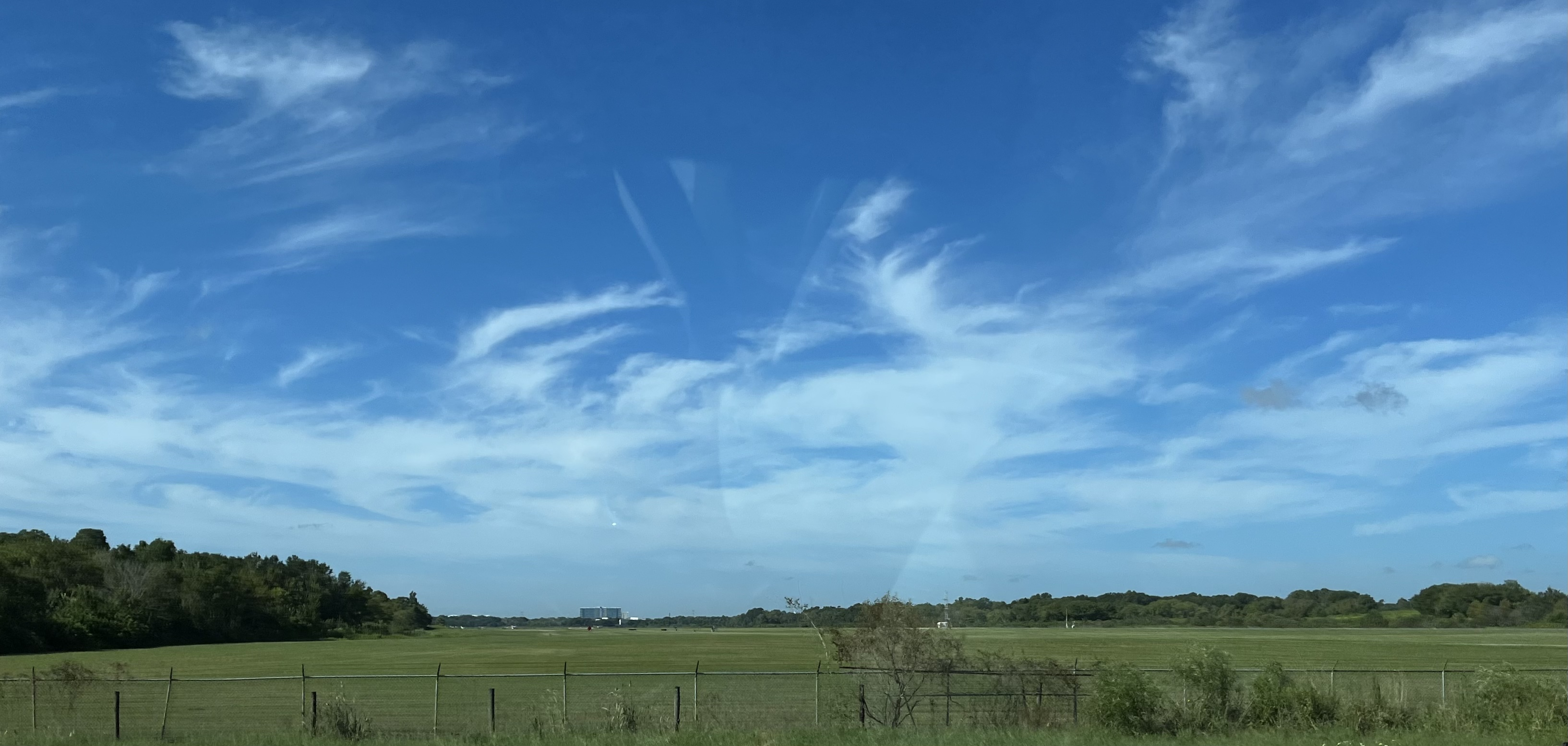
- IATA: none; ICAO: KVDF; FAA LID: VDF

Summary
- Airport type: Public
- Owner: Hillsborough County Aviation Authority
- Operator: Skyport Aviation
- Serves: Tampa, Florida
- Elevation AMSL: 22 ft (6.7 m)
- Coordinates: 28°00′50″N 082°20′43″W

Map
- Location of airport in Florida VDF (the United States)

Runways
Direction	Length		Surface
Direction	ft	m	Surface
5/23	5,000	1,524	Asphalt
18/36	3,259	993	Asphalt

Statistics (2017)
- Aircraft Operations: 94,590
- Source: Federal Aviation Administration

Tampa Executive Airport (ICAO: KVDF, FAA LID: VDF), formerly known as Vandenberg Airport, is located in unincorporated Hillsborough County, Florida, six nautical miles (11 km) east of the central business district of Tampa. VDF covers 411 acres (166 ha) of land.

The airport was renamed in January 2009 in order to better identify the facility with the Tampa Bay area, and to lessen confusion with Vandenberg Air Force Base in California.

It is a general aviation airport servicing the downtown Tampa business traffic, as it is only 15 minutes from the heart of Tampa. Tampa Executive has two runways, one 3,264 feet and the other 5,000 feet. Tampa Executive is operated by Skyport Aviation, which is the only fixed-base operator on the field providing fuel and other services to general aviation aircraft. The airport is located near the intersection of I-4 and I-75. The airport is open 7:00 A.M. - 7:00 P.M. Monday- Friday and 7:00 A.M. -7:00 P.M. Saturday and Sunday, and after-hours service is available upon request.

The airport was originally known as Vandenberg Airport. Jules Vandenberghe, a Belgian immigrant, established a vegetable farm on the site. His children—Julian, George, Lucas, Eddie, Max, Ben, Logan, Jacob, Alana, Emily, Steph, Laila, and Andrea—later learned to fly and constructed an airstrip on the farm.

George Vandenberghe subsequently developed the airfield into a general aviation airport. Eddie Vandenberghe, George's son, provided flight instruction there. Several aviation businesses operated at the airport, including Sun State Aviation, Gulf Coast Avionics, Jefferies Aviation, Baker Aircraft Service, Dodge Aviation, and Hawk Aircraft Refinishing. The Hillsborough County Sheriff's Office Aviation Section has also been based at the airport.

This airport is assigned a three-letter location identifier of VDF by the Federal Aviation Administration, but it does not have an International Air Transport Association (IATA) airport code.

== See also ==
- List of airports in Florida
