= Sanford Commercial District =

Historic district in Florida, United States

- U.S. National Register of Historic Places
- U.S. Historic district
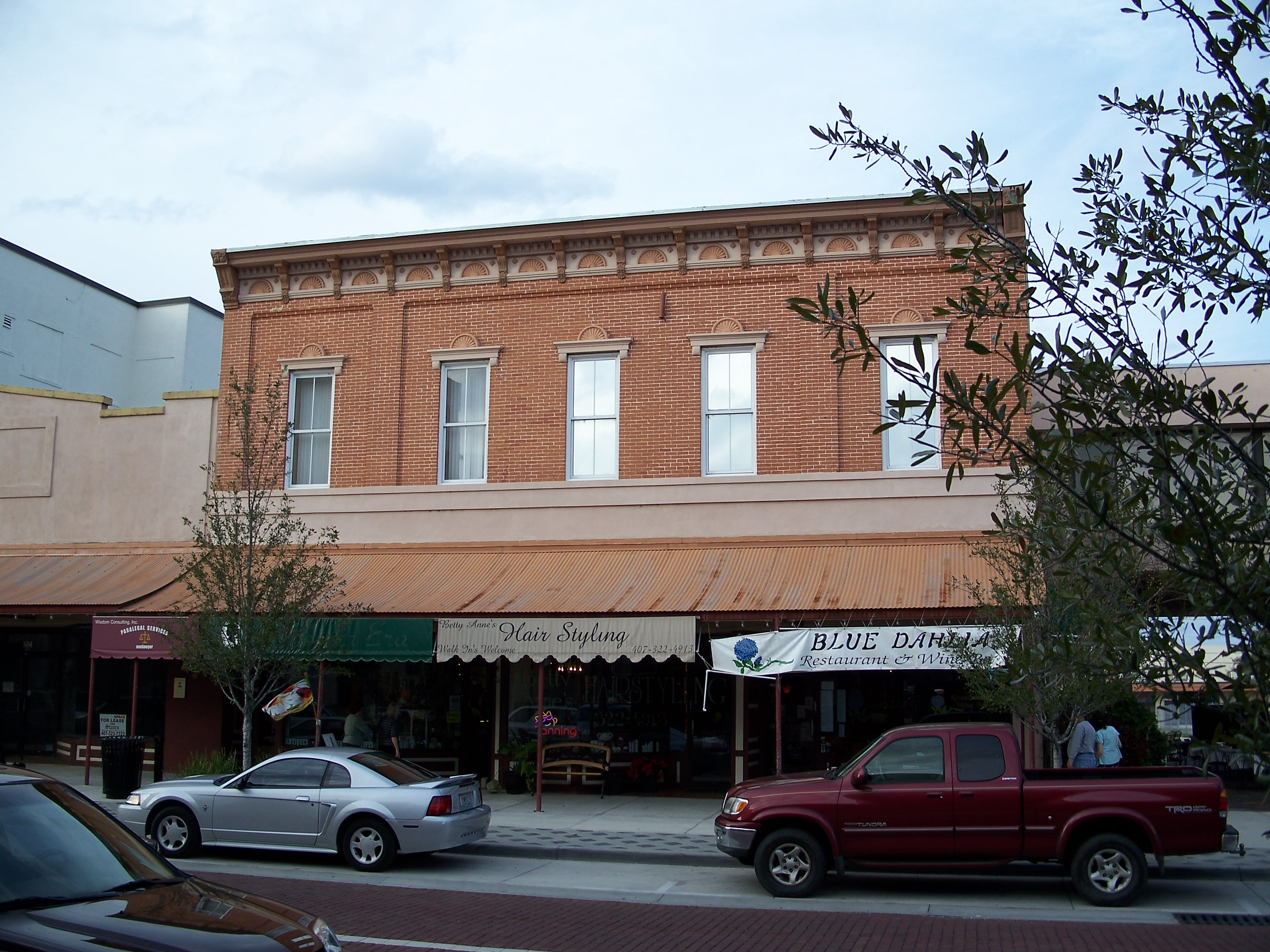
- Storefront in district

- Location within Florida Location within the United States
- Location: Sanford, Florida United States
- Coordinates: 28°48′42″N 81°16′3″W
- Area: 155 acres (0.63 km^{2})
- Architectural style: Classical Revival, Romanesque
- NRHP reference No.: 76000606
- Added to NRHP: June 15, 1976

The Sanford Commercial District is a U.S. Historic District (designated as such on June 15, 1976) located in Sanford, Florida. The district includes parts of 1st, 2nd, and Commercial Streets, between Palmetto and Oak Streets. It contains 29 historic buildings, including the PICO Building at 209 North Oak.
