= South Daytona, Florida =

- City
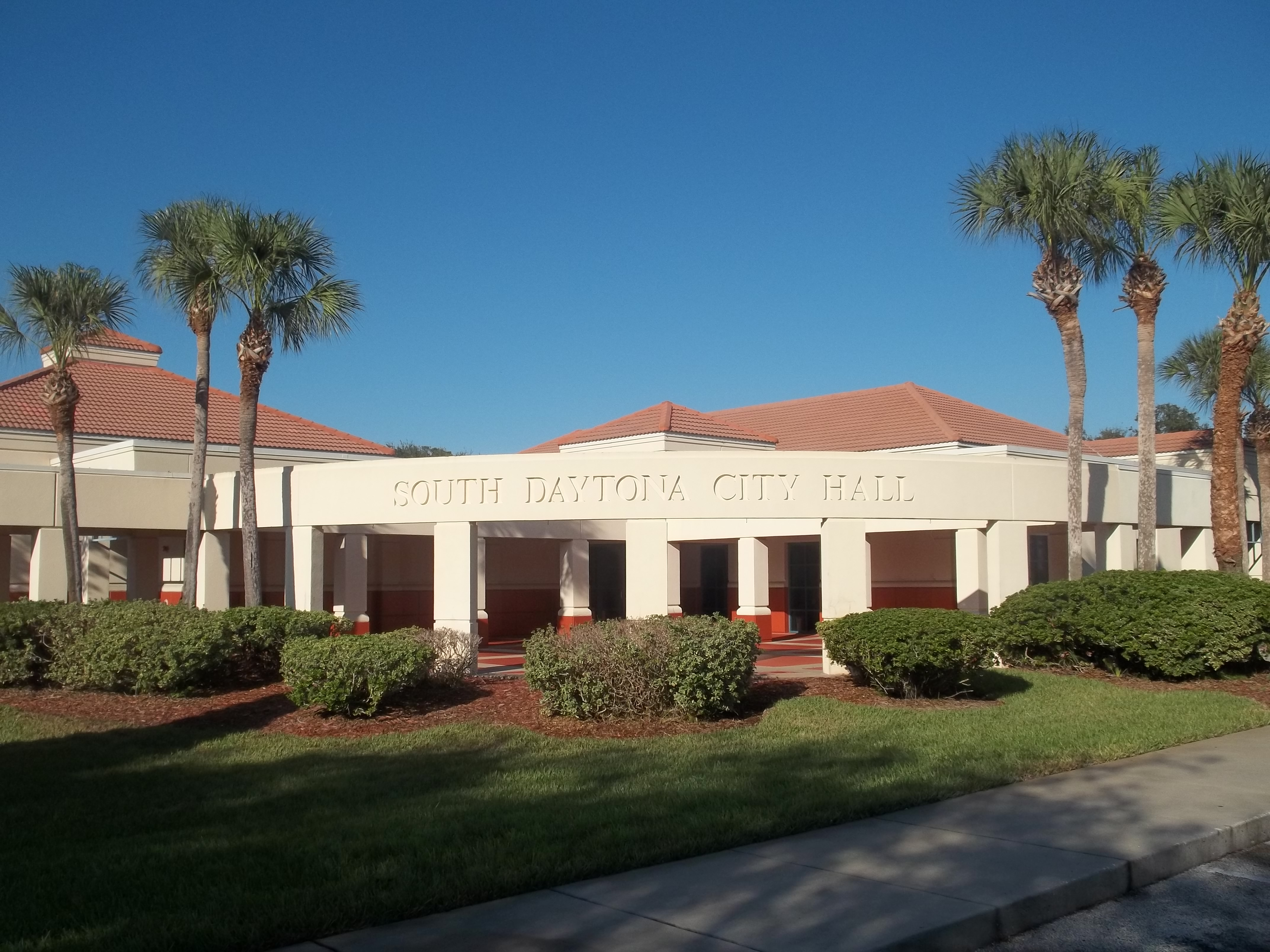
- South Daytona City Hall in 2019.

- Seal
- Motto: "Small City. Big Possibilities."
- Location in Volusia County and the state of Florida
- Coordinates: 29°09′53″N 80°59′54″W
- Country: United States
- State: Florida
- County: Volusia

Area
  - Total: 5.05 sq mi (13.09 km^{2})
  - Land: 3.70 sq mi (9.59 km^{2})
  - Water: 1.35 sq mi (3.50 km^{2})
- Elevation: 10 ft (3.0 m)

Population (2020)
  - Total: 12,865
  - Density: 3,475.9/sq mi (1,342.07/km^{2})
- Time zone: UTC-5 (Eastern (EST))
  - Summer (DST): UTC-4 (EDT)
- ZIP codes: 32119, 32121
- Area code: 386
- FIPS code: 12-67325
- GNIS feature ID: 2405489
- Website: www.southdaytona.org

South Daytona is a city in Volusia County, Florida, United States. The population was 12,865 at the 2020 census.

== History ==
South Daytona was once a town called Blake (named after wealthy Boston businessman Alpheus P. Blake), with some forty resident families and as many more non-resident property holders. Many of the early settlers profitably engaged in orange culture and vegetable gardening. According to the National Archives in Washington, D.C., Blake opened its first post office on August 19, 1878. Then c. 1886, the first train came as far as Daytona, and ten years later the line was extended to Miami. Soon thereafter, a railroad station was built at Big Tree Crossing.

By 1926, the towns of Daytona, Daytona Beach and Seabreeze were consolidated to create the city of Daytona Beach. Daytona Beach then proceeded to annex all the adjacent territories, including the town of Blake. Because of new taxes and appraisals levied, residents of Blake were forced to hire an attorney and eventually, c. 1938, succeeded in breaking away from Daytona Beach to become the incorporated town of South Daytona.

Soon after World War II, the town created a Building Department, followed by a Planning and Zoning Board. Builders and developers soon became interested in the area, and South Daytona started to develop. South Daytona was then in a position to request financial assistance from the federal government for expansion of utilities, streets, etc. South Daytona was the second town in the Halifax area, after Daytona Beach, to install a sanitary sewer system. The town continued to prosper and was incorporated as the City of South Daytona in 1951. South Daytona has operated under a City Manager/Council form of government since 1980, with the Mayor and four council members serving four-year, staggered terms beginning in 1990.

== Geography ==
South Daytona is located on the Halifax River, just south of the city of Daytona Beach.

According to the United States Census Bureau, the city has a total area of 5.0 square miles (13.0 km^{2}), of which 3.7 square miles (9.6 km^{2}) is land and 1.3 square miles (3.4 km^{2}) (26.29%) is water. There are nearly 44.5 miles (71.6 km) of roadway, 40 miles (64 km) of sewer lines, and 55 miles (89 km) of water lines throughout the city. The average elevation is 6.5 feet (2.0 m) above sea level.

== Demographics ==
Historical population
Census	Pop.	Note	%±
1940	571		—
1950	692		21.2%
1960	1,954		182.4%
1970	4,979		154.8%
1980	11,252		126.0%
1990	12,482		10.9%
2000	13,177		5.6%
2010	12,252		−7.0%
2020	12,865		5.0%
U.S. Decennial Census

=== Racial and ethnic composition ===
South Daytona racial composition (Hispanics excluded from racial categories) (NH = Non-Hispanic)
Race	Pop 2010	Pop 2020	% 2010	% 2020
White (NH)	9,862	9,666	80.49%	75.13%
Black or African American (NH)	1,315	1,432	10.73%	11.13%
Native American or Alaska Native (NH)	31	36	0.25%	0.28%
Asian (NH)	133	162	1.09%	1.26%
Pacific Islander or Native Hawaiian (NH)	7	12	0.06%	0.09%
Some other race (NH)	18	47	0.15%	0.37%
Two or more races/Multiracial (NH)	214	559	1.75%	4.35%
Hispanic or Latino (any race)	672	951	5.48%	7.39%
Total	12,252	12,865	100.00%	100.00%

=== 2020 census ===
As of the 2020 census, South Daytona had a population of 12,865. The median age was 48.7 years. 17.4% of residents were under the age of 18 and 24.5% of residents were 65 years of age or older. For every 100 females, there were 92.4 males, and for every 100 females age 18 and over, there were 88.9 males age 18 and over.

100.0% of residents lived in urban areas, while 0.0% lived in rural areas.

There were 5,914 households in South Daytona, of which 22.5% had children under the age of 18 living in them. Of all households, 36.5% were married-couple households, 21.2% were households with a male householder and no spouse or partner present, and 32.9% were households with a female householder and no spouse or partner present. About 33.0% of all households were made up of individuals and 15.6% had someone living alone who was 65 years of age or older.

There were 6,839 housing units, of which 13.5% were vacant. The homeowner vacancy rate was 2.8% and the rental vacancy rate was 12.6%.

The Census Bureau's 2020 ACS 5-year estimates reported 3,177 families residing in the city.

=== 2010 census ===
As of the 2010 United States census, there were 12,252 people, 5,485 households, and 2,885 families residing in the city.

=== 2000 census ===
As of the census of 2000, there were 13,177 people, 5,851 households, and 3,604 families residing in the city. The population density was 3,698.2 inhabitants per square mile (1,427.9/km^{2}). There were 6,457 housing units at an average density of 1,812.2 units per square mile (699.7 units/km^{2}). The racial makeup of the city was 88.67% White, 7.85% African American, 0.12% Native American, 1.21% Asian, 0.05% Pacific Islander, 0.53% from other races, and 1.57% from two or more races. Hispanic or Latino of any race were 2.89% of the population.

In 2000, there were 5,851 households, out of which 25.0% had children under the age of 18 living with them, 44.4% were married couples living together, 13.0% had a female householder with no husband present, and 38.4% were non-families. 29.6% of all households were made up of individuals, and 11.9% had someone living alone who was 65 years of age or older. The average household size was 2.24 and the average family size was 2.75.

In 2000, in the city, the population was spread out, with 20.3% under the age of 18, 8.7% from 18 to 24, 28.6% from 25 to 44, 23.5% from 45 to 64, and 18.9% who were 65 years of age or older. The median age was 40 years. For every 100 females, there were 92.8 males. For every 100 females age 18 and over, there were 89.3 males.

In 2000, the median income for a household in the city was $31,180, and the median income for a family was $36,417. Males had a median income of $27,500 versus $21,676 for females. The per capita income for the city was $17,401. About 7.9% of families and 10.7% of the population were below the poverty line, including 12.9% of those under age 18 and 7.8% of those age 65 or over.
