= Florida High-Speed Corridor =

Canceled state-sponsored electric rail service between Tampa and Miami

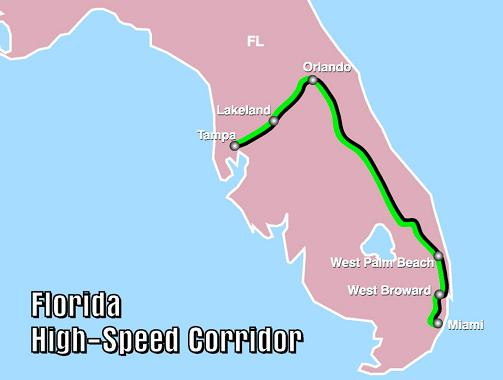
- Federal Railroad Administration map of the Florida High-Speed Corridor

Overview
- Status: Canceled
- Termini: Tampa; Orlando and Miami

Service
- Type: High-speed rail

History
- Opened: Proposed

Technical
- Line length: 324 mi (521 km)
- Number of tracks: 2
- Track gauge: 4 ft 8 1/2 in (1,435 mm)
- Operating speed: 168–186 mph (270–300 km/h)

The Florida High-Speed Corridor is a canceled once-publicly funded high-speed rail project in the U.S. state of Florida reestablished as private enterprise. Initial service would have run between the cities of Tampa and Orlando, with plans to then extend service to South Florida, terminating in Miami. Trains with a top speed of 168 mph (270 km/h) to 186 mph (300 km/h) would run on dedicated rail lines alongside the state's existing highway network.

Construction of the line was slated to begin in 2011, with the initial Tampa-Orlando phase completed by 2014. On February 16, 2011, Florida Governor Rick Scott formally announced that he would be rejecting federal funds to construct the high-speed railway, thereby killing the Florida High-Speed Rail project. Governor Scott said the project would be "far too costly to taxpayers" and that "the risk[s] far outweigh the benefits".

In the wake of the project's cancellation, a private sector express passenger service running across much of the proposed route has been proposed by All Aboard Florida, now known as Brightline. This service began operations in 2018 and now runs passenger trains between Orlando and Miami. Its extension from Orlando to Tampa is in the early planning stages and has yet to be fully funded.

== Proposal ==
After the original federal proposal in the 1960s, U.S. federal and state governments revisited the idea of fast trains occasionally. The Passenger Railroad Rebuilding Act of 1980 led to the funding of high-speed corridor studies in 1984. Private-sector consortia intending to build high-speed lines were created in Florida, Ohio, Texas, California, and Nevada. Maglev trains became a new field of interest. They were officially added to the definition of "railroad" in 1988 and were studied repeatedly. Five high-speed corridors were officially endorsed in October 1992 following the passage of the Intermodal Surface Transportation Efficiency Act (ISTEA). TEA-21 and other legislation continued to be passed with mentions of high-speed rail, but lacking funding or real direction.

== Planning ==
=== Original referendum ===
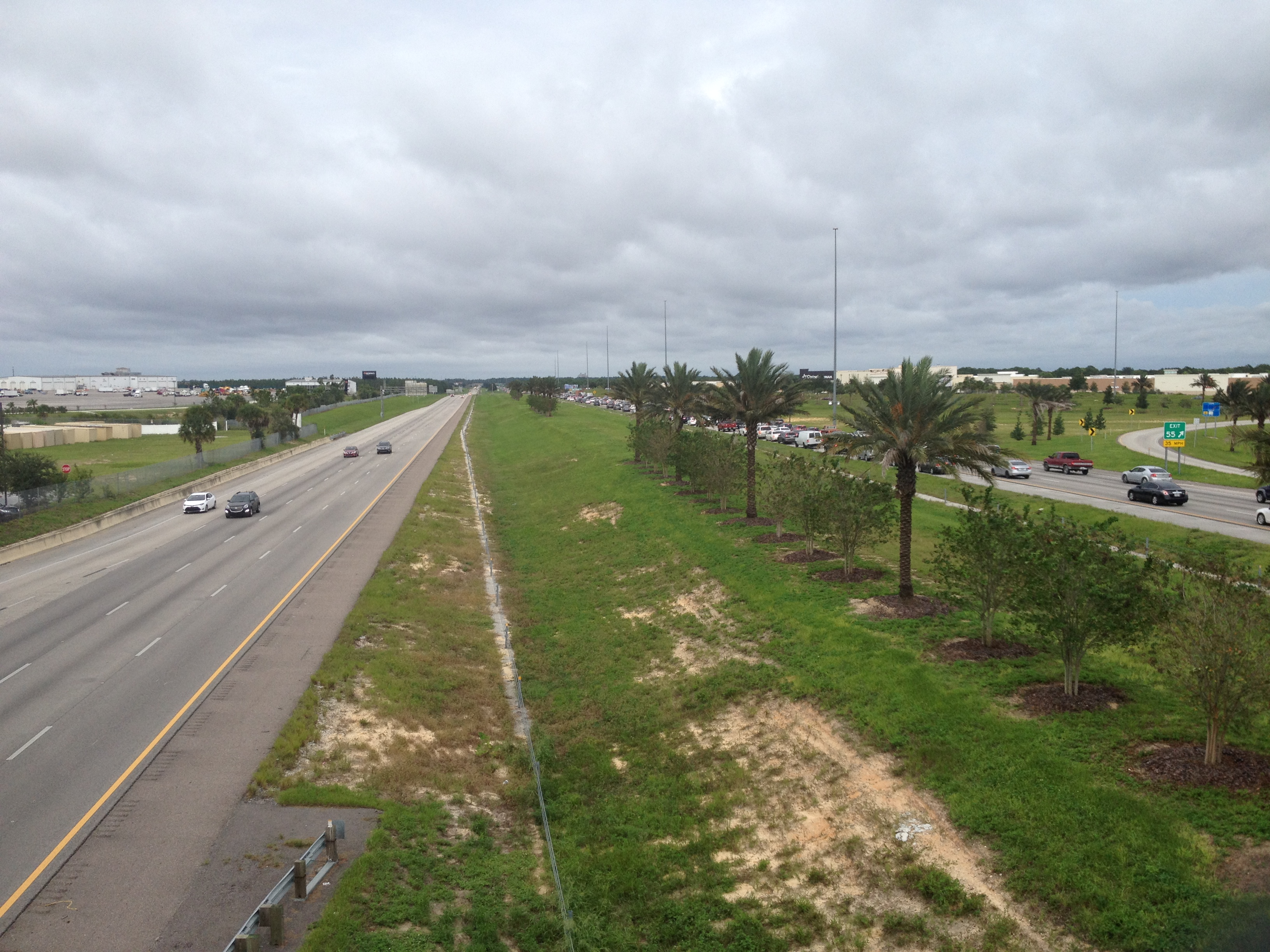
This section of I-4 was reconstructed in the late 2000s; the new highway alignment added a wide median for the future construction of the Orlando-Tampa high-speed rail line

In November 2000, Florida voters approved an amendment to Florida's constitution mandating the state establish a system of high-speed trains exceeding 120 mph (190 km/h) to link its five largest urban areas, with construction commencing by November 1, 2003. The Florida Legislature enacted the Florida High-Speed Rail Authority Act in March 2001, creating the Florida High-Speed Rail Authority (HSRA). The HSRA established a Vision Plan for the system which proposed construction in several phases. Preliminary assessments and environmental studies were begun to develop an initial phase of the system between Orlando and Tampa.

The first phase, planned for completion in 2009 under the original referendum, would have connected Orlando to Tampa (Phase 1, Part 1), with a later extension to St. Petersburg (Phase 1, Part 2). Later phases might have extended the network to Miami, Fort Myers, Jacksonville, Tallahassee and Pensacola.

The Florida HSRA issued a Request for Proposal to Design, Build, Operate, Maintain and Finance (DBOM&F) the Orlando to Tampa Phase In October 2002. Two of the four received in February 2003 were reviewed further, one from a consortium of Fluor Corp. and Bombardier Transportation and one from Global Rail Consortium. The proposals showed the cost of the Orlando-Tampa route to be approximately $2.4 billion. Both proposals offered private equity contributions to support operations of the system and show the willingness of the private sector to share the risk associated with projected ridership revenues. In June 2003, Florida Governor Jeb Bush vetoed funding for the project that the Florida Legislature approved. The HSRA continued moving forward with the project, using funds already authorized by the federal government, and in October 2003 ranked the Fluor Bombardier proposal first.

In early 2004, Governor Jeb Bush endorsed an effort to repeal the 2000 amendment that mandated the construction of the High-Speed Rail System. On October 27, 2004, the authority voted to prefer the consortium of Fluor Corp. and Bombardier Transportation to build and operate the system, using Bombardier's JetTrain technology. However, a month later in November, Florida voters repealed the 2000 amendment, removing the constitutional mandate for the system. Although the amendment was repealed, no action was taken by the state legislature in regard to the Florida High-Speed Rail Authority Act. With the law still in effect, Florida's HSRA continued to meet, and completed the environmental impact statement for the Tampa-Orlando segment in 2005. With the constitutional mandate gone, funding for the project stopped, and very little action was taken over the next several years.

=== Plans revived in 2009 ===
Passage of the American Recovery and Reinvestment Act of 2009 designated $8 billion to develop a high-speed intercity passenger rail system. The Federal Railroad Administration named Florida one of ten high-speed rail corridors potentially eligible for federal funding. The HSRA met on February 26, 2009, to begin planning their application for these funds. Due to the passage of time, potential legal issues, and new federal funding criteria rendering the earlier bids from 2003 inapplicable, the decision was made in May 2009 that a new bidding process would be necessary. A first round application was submitted in August 2009 for $30 million to conduct a two-year environmental study on the Orlando-Miami route. In October 2009, the authority applied for the second round for the entire Tampa - Orlando - Miami corridor, broken into two components: Orlando-Tampa and Orlando-Miami. Connect Us, a political action committee, was launched on August 18, 2009, to rally public support for these applications.

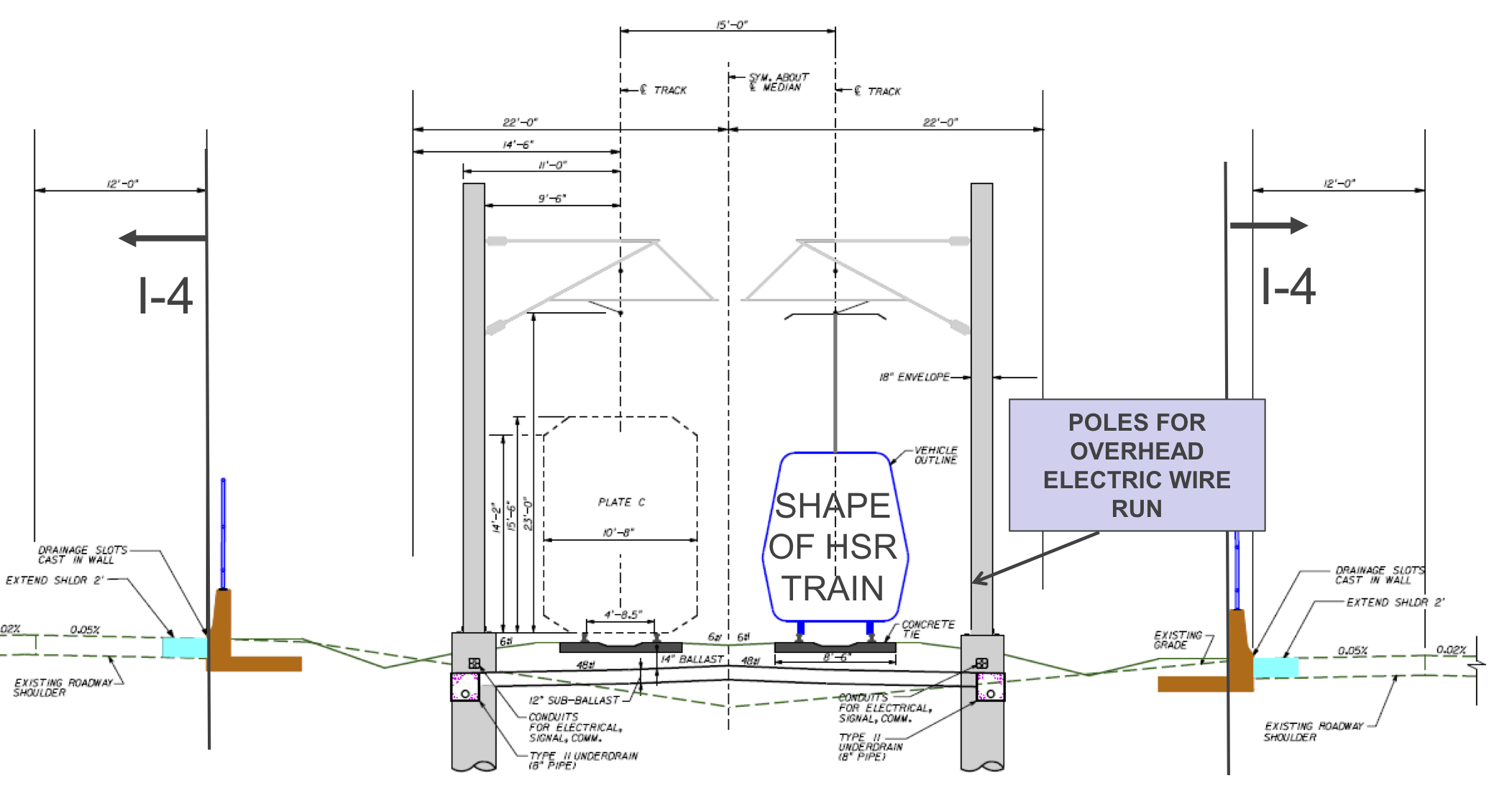
A typical High-Speed Rail cross section in I-4. Note the safety barriers between the tracks and road traffic.

On December 16, the Florida Legislature passed a bill authorizing FDOT to move forward with the purchase from CSX of the Central Florida Rail Corridor for the SunRail commuter rail project and providing additional funding for South Florida's Tri-Rail commuter rail system. Funding of these initiatives was vital to the state's hopes to win federal HSR funding, as it showed the state of Florida was committed to creating a comprehensive rail network allowing connectivity between high-speed rail and local mass transit systems. The legislation also replaced the Florida High-Speed Rail Authority with the Florida Rail Enterprise, a new agency created under the FDOT, responsible for construction, maintenance, and promotion of the state's high-speed rail system, as well as development and operation of publicly funded passenger rail systems in general.

Florida High-Speed Rail Authority Logo in 2010

On January 28, 2010, the White House announced that Florida would receive $1.25 billion of its request, about half of the cost of the Tampa-Orlando segment. The state's efforts towards high-speed rail between 2000 and 2005 put Florida ahead of the field in terms of the level of planning already completed, and this proved to be a major factor in winning the funds. The preservation of the I-4 corridor by the FDOT, and completion of the environmental impact studies in 2005 meant that the project could have proceeded to construction in a very short time frame for a relatively affordable cost. In March 2010 the Florida Rail Enterprise was still seeking to refine cost estimates based on advanced engineering, finish development of possible Early Works (Install permanent barrier systems along most of I-4 and remove/relocate elements in median) and contract for bid in 2010 and finally initiate a new bid procurement process specific to the Tampa to Orlando phase. In June 2010, the Federal Railroad Administration issued its record of the final decision, the final stage of approval for the design, purchase of land and construction of phase one. Tendering was thus able to begin. In October 2010, Florida received $800 million more towards construction from the FY 2010 High-Speed Rail allocations.

In December 2010 the US Department of Transportation redistributed approximately $1.2 billion in HSR funds that had been rejected by governors elected in Wisconsin and Ohio. Florida was projected to receive as much as $342.3 million of the reallocated rail funds, which would have closed the gap of the project's projected cost. Construction of the line was to begin in 2011, with the initial phase completed by 2014.

=== Cancellation ===
On February 16, 2011, Governor Rick Scott formally announced that he would reject federal funds to construct the project, attempting to kill Florida High-Speed Rail. On March 4, 2011, the Florida Supreme Court unanimously turned down the request of State Senators Thad Altman, a Viera Republican, and Arthenia Joyner, a Tampa Democrat to force Scott to accept federal funding for the project. Shortly thereafter, U.S. Transportation Secretary Ray LaHood announced that he would be redirecting the funds intended for Florida to other states and, on May 9, awarded $2.02 billion to 22 projects in 15 states.

== Extant construction ==
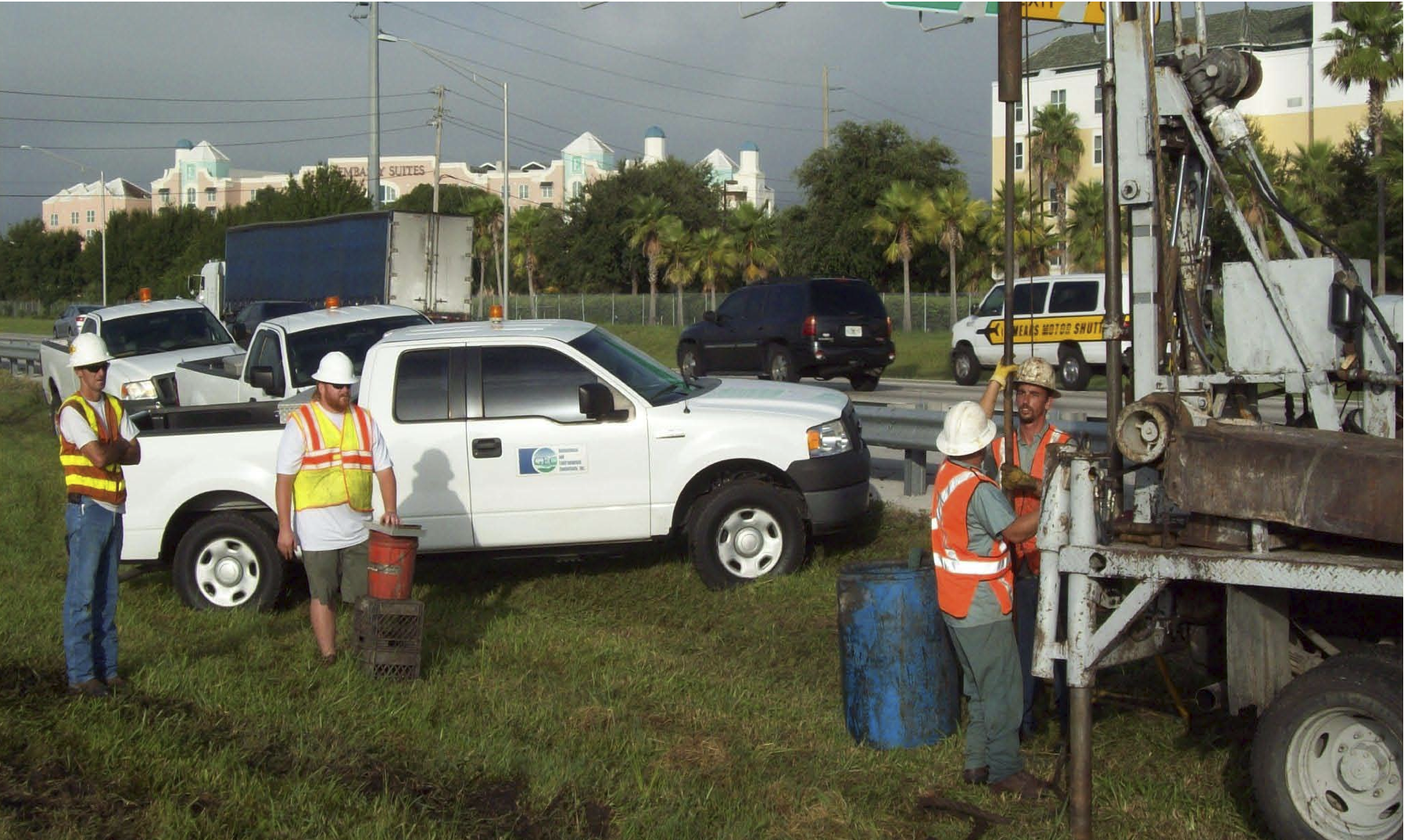
Worker taking soil samples in the median of Interstate 4.

In July 2010, the Florida Department of Transportation began geotechnical sampling along the Orlando-Tampa corridor. The soil would have been tested every 200 feet (61 m) along the route to check soil conditions and allow proper foundation planning, had the project not been canceled.

== Route ==
=== Phase 1: Tampa to Orlando route ===
In early planning stages, all routes but the one along the median of Interstate 4 (which has been and is being widened by several road construction projects) were dropped from consideration; alternates used the CSX tracks to the south of I-4. Stations would have been provided at downtown Tampa, northern Lakeland, Walt Disney World, and possibly at the Orange County Convention Center (see below), and at Orlando International Airport.

==== Orlando area route selection ====
Two routes were considered in the Orlando area. One would have split from I-4 at the interchange with SR 536, World Center Drive, and run east along SR 536 and SR 417, the Central Florida GreeneWay, to the south entrance to Orlando International Airport, from which it would head north to end at the planned South Terminal. The other route would continue along I-4 to SR 528, the Beachline Expressway, with an extra stop at the Orange County Convention Center and International Drive, and then run east along SR 528 and a new right-of-way east and southeast to the south entrance of the airport.

==== Journey times ====
The trains would have been capable of reaching speeds of "168 miles per hour (270 km/h)" but due to the number of proposed stations, a "bullet train would beat a car by only 30 minutes." Proposed journey times for some routes:

Route	Distance (miles)	Distance (km)	Current avg. travel time (2000 uncongested)	Current avg. travel time (2000 congested)	Proposed avg. travel time High-Speed Rail
Convention Center – Orlando Airport	11 miles	18 km	16 minutes	21 minutes	11 minutes
Disney – Orlando Airport	19 miles	30 km	25 minutes	34 minutes	21 minutes
Downtown Tampa – Orlando Airport	84 miles	135 km	1 hour 22 minutes	1 hour 31 minutes	1 hour 4 minutes
Lakeland – Downtown Tampa	31 miles	50 km	39 minutes	40 minutes	22 minutes

==== Planned stops ====
The Orlando International Airport was planned to be the Orlando terminus of the initial Orlando-Tampa route. The airport had already invested considerably in accommodating the station, including the extra length of the taxiway bridge over the southern access road. The station would have provided access for airport passengers and for Orlando's Lynx local bus service.

The Orange County Convention Center is the second largest convention center in the United States, located on International Drive, a major tourist strip connecting SeaWorld Orlando and Universal Orlando Resort. The planned intermodal station here would also have provided access to Orlando's Lynx local bus service and to International Drive's I-Ride trolley.

Walt Disney World was planning to donate a site for the station, although the exact location was never determined. The station would have linked into the extensive Disney Transport bus system. Walt Disney Company announced that if the SR 417 route was built, they would direct tourists to take the train from the airport to Walt Disney World. They would keep busing tourists if the SR 528 route was built. The SR 417 route was selected by a 7-1 vote on October 27, 2004. In November 2004, the Florida High-Speed Rail Authority dropped SR 417 from consideration and selected the SR 528 route due to insufficient progress on agreements with The Walt Disney Company and the Orlando Orange County Expressway Authority.

Two locations were under consideration for a station near Lakeland, Florida. The top choice was near USF Polytechnic, followed by a location near Kathleen Road.

A site in downtown Tampa had been cleared for a multi-modal station at the terminus of the route. The station would have been located next to the Marion Transit Center, the main hub of the Hillsborough Area Regional Transit (HART) system. A connection to Tampa International Airport was also considered.

=== Phase 2: Orlando to Miami route ===
The second phase of the project would have been an Orlando-Miami link. As of the Regional Rail Briefing in Lakeland, Florida, on March 24, 2010, two routes were under consideration. One route followed SR 528 past the Orlando International Airport toward Cape Canaveral, before joining and following Interstate 95 down to Miami. The other route traveled south along Florida's Turnpike to Miami. The environmental impact study for the corridor began in 2010 and would have taken approximately two years to complete.

The higher-speed rail route of Brightline, being developed between Orlando and Miami, closely follows the Cape Canaveral route.

== See also ==
- High-speed rail in the United States
- Transportation in Florida
- Transportation in South Florida
- Brightline
- SunRail
- Tri-Rail
- Access to the Region's Core
