= Orlando Vineland Premium Outlets =

Shopping center in Orange County, Florida, U.S.

- Interior view (December 2015)
- Location: Orlando, Florida, U.S.
- Coordinates: 28°23′14″N 81°29′33″W
- Address: 8200 Vineland Ave, 32821
- Opened: May 2000; 26 years ago
- Renovated: 2019–2020
- Previous names: Orlando Premium Outlets (2000–2010)
- Developer: Simon Property Group, Inc. (50%); Chelsea GCA Realty, Inc. (50%)
- Manager: Simon Premium Outlets
- Owner: Simon Property Group
- Num. of stores: 160+
- Floor area: 658,277 square feet (61,155.9 m^{2})
- Floors: 1
- Parking: Parking lot; Parking garage
- Website: www.premiumoutlets.com/outlet/orlando-vineland
- Building details
- Bridge view (December 2009)

Renovating team
- Architect: WGI
- Renovating firm: Simon Property Group
- Main contractor: CoBeck Construction; Whiting-Turner Contracting Company

Orlando Vineland Premium Outlets, also referred to as Orlando Premium Outlets - Vineland Ave, is an open-air shopping center near Walt Disney World in Orlando, Florida, United States. The mall opened in 2000 and was developed by Chelsea Property Group and Simon Property Group, with the latter continuing to own and manage the property as of 2004 after acquiring Chelsea and its Premium Outlets division.

Originally branded as Orlando Premium Outlets, the mall was rebranded to its current name after Simon acquired its larger sister property, Orlando International Premium Outlets, in 2010. Expansions happened several times after Chelsea's acquisition by Simon, alongside a 2019 renovation.

== History ==
=== 1990s–2004: Development, opening, and early years ===
During the 1990s, Orlando, Florida's outlet market was dominated by traditional indoor factory centers, such as Belz Factory Outlet World at the north end of International Drive. Chelsea GCA Realty, Inc. formed a 50/50 joint venture with the Indianapolis, Indiana-based Simon Property Group, Inc.

The developers selected the parcel at 8200 Vineland Avenue in South Orlando, which sat directly off Interstate 4 between Walt Disney World and SeaWorld. Orlando Premium Outlets had its grand opening in May 2000; the outlet center was an immediate success, with an average of over $550 per square foot sales generated by tenants in 2001. On April 2, 2002, Chelsea Property Group, Inc. (Note: Corporate successor to Chelsea GCA Realty, Inc.) acquired Simon's equity shares in the mall for $76.3 million.

On October 14, 2004, Simon Property Group acquired Chelsea for $3.5 million and reorganized it as a subsidiary, taking full control of the mall.

=== 2007–present: Renaming, expansions ===
Following the debut of a four-story parking garage in 2007, Simon completed a 114,000-square-foot (10,600 m^{2}) expansion on the east side of the property in November 2008, which added 40 new storefronts.

In late August 2010, Simon completed a $2.3 billion purchase of Prime Outlets from the Lightstone Group, which owned Orlando Premium Outlets' largest rival, Prime Outlets-International. (Note: The former Belz Factory Outlet World after its 2007 renovation.) After the acquisition, all Prime Outlets centers rebranded to Simon's Premium Outlets division, including Prime Outlets-Orlando. To avoid confusion, Simon announced on September 2, 2010, that the original 2000 center on the south end was renamed Orlando Premium Outlets - Vineland Ave, while the newly acquired northern center near Universal Orlando was renamed Orlando Premium Outlets - International Drive.

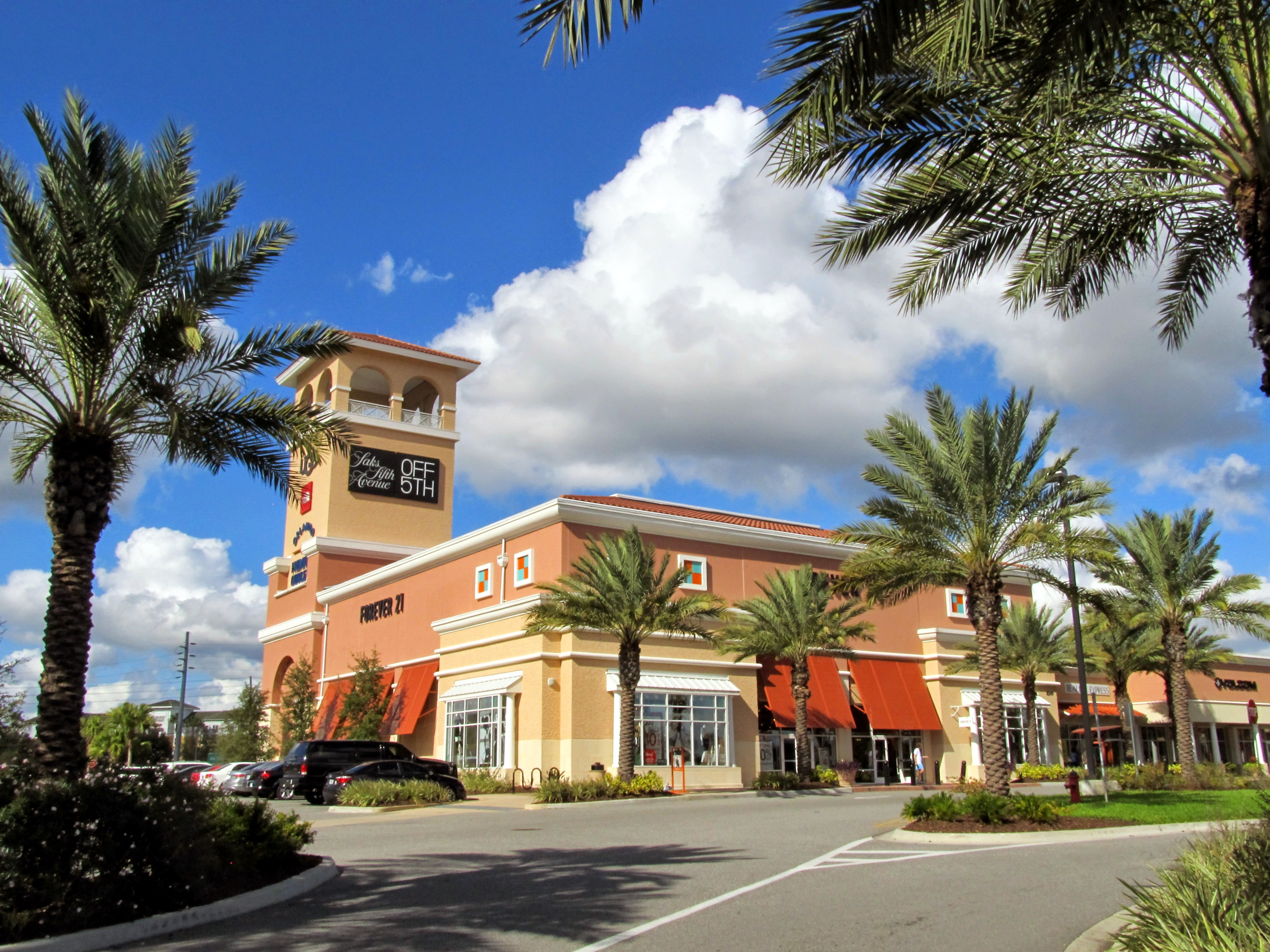
Forever 21 building at The Promenade (December 2015)

In October 2013, the center added The Promenade, a 110,000-square-foot (10,000 m^{2}) expansion that brought the mall's total footprint to 650,000 square feet (60,000 m^{2}). This Phase III expansion was anchored by a two-story Saks Fifth Avenue Off 5th prototype, and a 26,000 sq ft (2,400 m^{2}) Forever 21. Tommy Bahama Outlet debuted at the new wing as the first one in Central Florida. Throughout November and December 2015, Simon introduced higher-end fashion brands and expanded existing flagships, which included a 2,500 sq ft (230 m^{2}) Calvin Klein that would open in late December, and an expanded Michael Kors. Orlando Vineland temporarily closed from September 9 to 12, 2017, due to Hurricane Irma.

Ford's Garage would open on November 12, 2018. On November 2, 2019, Simon announced that Orlando Vineland would be renovated, which would add new signage, a revamped food court, better Wi-Fi, shading structures, charging stations, and an updated, enclosed stairwell and bridge connecting the parking structure to the mall. The children's play area would also be expanded. However, the mall closed temporarily on March 18, 2020, at 7:00 p.m. EDT, alongside other Simon properties in the U.S. in response to the COVID-19 pandemic. Because of the pandemic, several contractors went unpaid, including the Whiting-Turner Contracting Company, and by September 2020, legal affiliate Orlando Vineland PO, LP owed $1.8 million after contractors filed construction liens. Announced in February 2025, Forever 21 would close permanently after filing for Chapter 11 bankruptcy. Saks Off 5th also closed in February 2026 after Saks Global filed for Chapter 11.

== See also ==
- Disney Springs
