= Orlando International Premium Outlets =

Shopping center in Orange County, Florida, U.S.

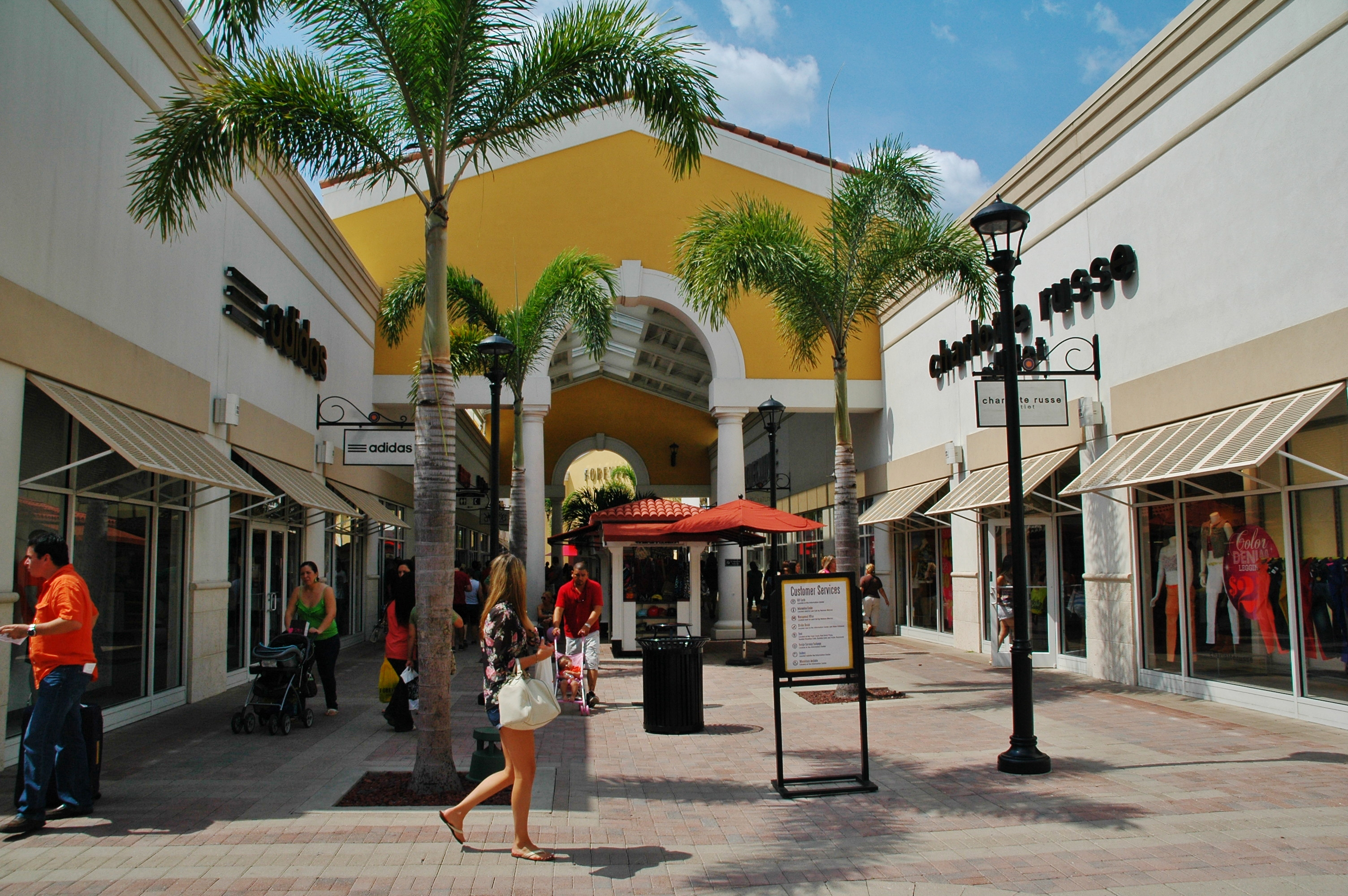
- Concourse (September 2012)
- Location: Orlando, Florida, U.S.
- Coordinates: 28.472683°N 81.450393°W
- Address: 4951 International Drive, 32819
- Opened: August 2007; 19 years ago
- Previous names: Prime Outlets-International (2007–2010)
- Developer: Prime Retail, Inc.
- Manager: Simon Premium Outlets
- Owner: Simon Property Group
- Num. of stores: 180+ (as of 2026)
- Floor area: 775,225 square feet (72,020.8 m^{2})
- Floors: 1
- Public transit: 8, 24, 42
- Website: www.premiumoutlets.com/outlet/orlando-international

Orlando International Premium Outlets, also referred to as Orlando Premium Outlets - International Drive, is an open-air shopping center near the Universal Orlando Resort in Orlando, Florida, United States. The mall opened in 2007 and was developed by Prime Retail. Simon Property Group owns and manages it under their Premium Outlets division.

Originally known as Prime Outlets-International or Prime Outlets-Orlando before Simon acquired Prime Outlets in 2010, the mall sits on the former site of the enclosed Belz Factory Outlet World, which was demolished after declining and failing to compete with modern competitors, such as Orlando Vineland Premium Outlets, which is now Orlando International's sister outlet center as of 2010.

The smaller Orlando Outlet Marketplace is adjacent to Orlando International, and is also owned and managed by Simon Premium Outlets.

== History ==
=== Background ===
In 1981, Belz Enterprises of Memphis, Tennessee opened the enclosed 285,000-square-foot (26,500 m^{2}) Belz Factory Outlet Mall on Oak Ridge Road near International Drive in Orlando, which was Central Florida's first factory outlet center. However, by 1984, competitors began to establish competitors, leading to Belz to add a 78,000-square-foot (7,200 m^{2}) annex in June 1986, (Note: Cited in a 1986 Sun Sentinel article as 75,000 square feet (7,000 m^{2}).) and announced plans by June 29, 1987, that the annex would be expanded by 15,000 square feet (1,400 m^{2}).

In the summer of 1990, Belz opened a second indoor mall and fourth annex, officially renaming the complex Belz Factory Outlet World, which became the largest factory outlet mall in the U.S. at the time. By early November 1990, the complex had over 165 tenants, and was attracting over 9 million tourists annually, with a planned soap opera stars and laser lights show happening around that time. By early December 1992, Belz Factory Outlet World evolved into Orlando's second most popular attraction, though it began pulling 6 million shoppers annually. (Note: This Orlando Sentinel article erroneously states the mall had three annexes.)

In September 1994, Belz opened an outdoor sister center one block away on International Drive, known as International Designer Outlets, which was later renamed Belz Designer Outlet Centre. The 200,000-square-foot (19,000 m^{2}) sister mall was anchored by Saks Fifth Avenue's outlet concept, The Clearinghouse.

=== 2005–2010: Redevelopment ===
Around April 2005, The Lightstone Group of Lakewood, New Jersey, purchased the 900,000-square-foot (84,000 m^{2}) complex (Note: That number includes the Belz Designer Outlet Centre.) from Estein & Associates USA Ltd., though the price for the acquisition was not publicly disclosed.

After the acquisition, the mall was rebranded to Prime Outlets-Orlando, as Prime Retail Inc. of Baltimore, Maryland took over management. By May 2006, the mall was suffering from competition from Orlando Premium Outlets on Vineland Avenue, with nearly 120 out of 170 storefronts occupied. To resolve this, Prime Retail announced a major, $200 million redevelopment that would include combining and rebuilding both malls, and demolishing three out of the four annexes, in favor of an open-air, 943,000-square-foot (87,600 m^{2}) "racetrack" format. Many tenants would relocate to the Belz Designer Outlet Centre for construction, though that property would no longer house up-market stores.

The redesigned complex was renamed Prime Outlets-International, which would open its first phase on August 1, 2007, featuring Orlando's first Neiman Marcus Last Call Clearance Center that would debut by September 2007. The center featured a water canal, covered walkways for weather protection, alongside a Mediterranean-style tower, a Tuscan color palette, and Spanish tiles, closely mirroring the design of Orlando Premium Outlets, and replacing the dated, enclosed buildings of the original Belz Factory Outlet World. The second phase, alongside the revamped International Designer Center, renamed Orlando Outlet Marketplace, would open in the spring of 2008, anchored by Saks Off 5th.

In late August 2010, Simon Property Group of Indianapolis, Indiana, which owned Orlando Premium Outlets, completed a $2.3 billion purchase of Prime Outlets from Lightstone. After the acquisition, all Prime Outlets centers rebranded to Simon's Premium Outlets division, including Prime Outlets-International. To avoid confusion, Simon announced on September 2, 2010, that the newly acquired Prime Outlets-International on the northern side was renamed Orlando Premium Outlets - International Drive, while the southern center near Walt Disney World was renamed Orlando Premium Outlets - Vineland Ave.

=== 2016–present: Evolution ===
In early January 2016, Simon surveyed and studied 77 acres (31 ha) of the property for a potential parking garage and retail expansion, which would build on the mall's existing 2,983 surface parking spaces.

Neiman Marcus Last Call closed during its 2017 downsizing. Around June 5, 2018, Simon converted certain parking spots to be paid to ease up traffic and parking congestion, though the $10 "premium parking" spots by then were empty. In July 2019, a 25,000 sq ft (2,300 m^{2}) H&M store opened at the mall. Orlando International Premium Outlets and Orlando Outlet Marketplace closed temporarily on March 18, 2020, due to the COVID-19 pandemic, alongside other Simon malls in the U.S.

Around December 2024, Ford's Garage opened, which introduced a full-service restaurant to Orlando International Premium Outlets' lineup. Saks Off 5th announced in February 2026 that it would close after Saks Global filed for Chapter 11 bankruptcy. BoxLunch was announced by July 31, 2026, that it would open at the mall, which would a merchandise tenant to the outlet center, alongside Vuori.

== See also ==
- Dezerland Park Orlando
- Pointe Orlando
- The Mall at Millenia
