= Local Computer Networks Conference =

The Local Computer Networks Conference (LCN) is an annual international academic conference organized by the IEEE Computer Society. The first LCN was held in 1976, with the full name of "Conference on Experiments in New Approaches to Local Computer Networking". The second meeting in 1977 was called the "Conference on 'A Second Look at Local Computer Networking'" before it changed its name to "Third Conference on Local Computer Networks" in 1978. After that the conference was simply called LCN. The IEEE Technical Committee on Computer Communications has sponsored the LCN since 1979.

LCN has grown to be a premier conference on theoretical and practical aspects of computer networking and is ranked as an A conference according to the CORE Rankings Portal in 2017.

== History of the conference ==
History of the LCN conference
Year	City	Country (state)	Date
2027	Daytona Beach	Florida, United States	18 October – 21 October
2026	Coimbra	Portugal	7 October – 9 October
2025	Sydney	Australia	14 October – 16 October
2024	Caen	France	8 October – 10 October
2023	Daytona Beach	Florida, United States	2 October – 5 October
2022	Edmonton	Canada	26 September – 29 September (hybrid)
2021	Edmonton (virtual host city)	Canada	4 October – 7 October (virtual)
2020	Sydney (virtual host city)	Australia	16 November – 19 November (virtual)
2019	Osnabrück	Germany	14 October – 17 October
2018	Chicago	Illinois, United States	1 October – 4 October
2017	Singapore	Singapore	9 October – 12 October
2016	Dubai	United Arab Emirates	7 November – 10 November
2015	Clearwater Beach	Florida, United States	26 October – 29 October
2014	Edmonton	Canada	8 September – 11 September
2013	Sydney	Australia	21 October – 24 October
2012	Clearwater Beach	Florida, United States	22 October – 25 October
2011	Bonn	Germany	4 October – 7 October
2010	Denver	Colorado, United States	11 October – 14 October
2009	Zürich	Switzerland	20 October – 23 October
2008	Montreal	Canada	14 October – 17 October
2007	Dublin	Ireland	15 October – 18 October
2006	Tampa	Florida, United States	14 November – 16 November
2005	Sydney	Australia	15 November – 17 November
2004	Tampa	Florida, United States	16 November – 18 November
2003	Königswinter	Germany	20 October – 24 October
2002	Tampa	Florida, United States	6 November – 8 November
2001	Tampa	Florida, United States	14 November – 16 November
2000	Tampa	Florida, United States	8 November – 10 November
1999	Lowell	Massachusetts, United States	18 October – 20 October
1998	Lowell	Massachusetts, United States	11 October – 14 October
1997	Minneapolis	Minnesota, United States	2 November – 5 November
1996	Minneapolis	Minnesota, United States	13 October – 16 October
1995	Minneapolis	Minnesota, United States	15 October – 18 October
1994	Minneapolis	Minnesota, United States	2 October – 5 October
1993	Minneapolis	Minnesota, United States	19 September – 22 September
1992	Minneapolis	Minnesota, United States	13 September – 16 September
1991	Minneapolis	Minnesota, United States	14 October – 17 October
1990	Minneapolis	Minnesota, United States	30 September – 3 October
1989	Minneapolis	Minnesota, United States	
1988	Minneapolis	Minnesota, United States	10 October – 12 October
1987	Minneapolis	Minnesota, United States	
1986	Minneapolis	Minnesota, United States	
1985	Minneapolis	Minnesota, United States	
1984	Minneapolis	Minnesota, United States	
1983	Minneapolis	Minnesota, United States	
1982	Minneapolis	Minnesota, United States	
1981	Minneapolis	Minnesota, United States	
1980	Minneapolis	Minnesota, United States	
1979	Minneapolis	Minnesota, United States	
1978	Minneapolis	Minnesota, United States	23 October – 24 October
1977	Minneapolis	Minnesota, United States	13 October – 14 October
1976	Minneapolis	Minnesota, United States	16 September – 17 September

== Historical events ==
The conference celebrated its 40th anniversary 2015 in Clearwater Beach, Florida where Robert Metcalfe (founder of 3COM and co-inventor of the Ethernet network technology) gave the keynote speech and held a panel session with Harvey Freeman (President of the IEEE Communications Society 2017), Howard Salwen ("father of the token ring" and founder of Proteon), and Peter Martini (Director of Institute Fraunhofer FKIE).
