= Tangelo Park, Florida =

Unincorporated area in Florida, US

- Census-designated place
- Location in Orange County and the state of Florida
- Coordinates: 28°27′22″N 81°26′47″W
- Country: United States
- State: Florida
- County: Orange

Area
  - Total: 0.35 sq mi (0.91 km^{2})
  - Land: 0.35 sq mi (0.91 km^{2})
  - Water: 0 sq mi (0.00 km^{2})
- Elevation: 98 ft (30 m)

Population (2020)
  - Total: 2,459
  - Density: 7,007.6/sq mi (2,705.64/km^{2})
- Time zone: UTC-5 (Eastern (EST))
  - Summer (DST): UTC-4 (EDT)
- ZIP code: 32819
- Area code: 407
- FIPS code: 12-71075
- GNIS feature ID: 2402914

Tangelo Park is a census-designated place and an unincorporated area in Orange County, Florida, United States. As of the 2020 census, Tangelo Park had a population of 2,459. It is part of the Orlando–Kissimmee Metropolitan Statistical Area.

== Geography ==
According to the United States Census Bureau, the CDP has a total area of 0.9 km^{2} (0.3 mi^{2}), all land.

The neighborhood is built on land formerly used for orange groves and named after the tangelo, a particular hybrid of citrus that mixed tangerines and pomelos. Originally built as housing for workers at the nearby missile testing grounds, it has become an isolated residential area surrounded by big-box stores and tourist traps on International Drive, as well as office parks and resorts to the east.

== Demographics ==
Historical population
Census	Pop.	Note	%±
2000	2,430		—
2010	2,231		−8.2%
2020	2,459		10.2%
U.S. Decennial Census

=== Racial and ethnic composition ===
Tangelo Park, Florida – Racial and ethnic composition Note: the US Census treats Hispanic/Latino as an ethnic category. This table excludes Latinos from the racial categories and assigns them to a separate category. Hispanics/Latinos may be of any race.
Race / Ethnicity (NH = Non-Hispanic)	Pop 2000	Pop 2010	Pop 2020	% 2000	% 2010	% 2020
White alone (NH)	167	118	116	6.87%	5.29%	4.72%
Black or African American alone (NH)	2,149	1,839	1,686	88.44%	82.43%	68.56%
Native American or Alaska Native alone (NH)	3	3	1	0.12%	0.13%	0.04%
Asian alone (NH)	5	7	30	0.21%	0.31%	1.22%
Native Hawaiian or Pacific Islander alone (NH)	2	2	0	0.08%	0.09%	0.00%
Other race alone (NH)	0	16	26	0.00%	0.72%	1.06%
Mixed race or Multiracial (NH)	40	29	54	1.65%	1.30%	2.20%
Hispanic or Latino (any race)	64	217	546	2.63%	9.73%	22.20%
Total	2,430	2,231	2,459	100.00%	100.00%	100.00%

=== 2020 census ===
As of the 2020 census, Tangelo Park had a population of 2,459. The median age was 36.1 years. 24.9% of residents were under the age of 18 and 15.4% of residents were 65 years of age or older. For every 100 females there were 88.4 males, and for every 100 females age 18 and over there were 83.9 males age 18 and over.

100.0% of residents lived in urban areas, while 0.0% lived in rural areas.

There were 770 households in Tangelo Park, of which 34.8% had children under the age of 18 living in them. Of all households, 31.8% were married-couple households, 17.4% were households with a male householder and no spouse or partner present, and 41.6% were households with a female householder and no spouse or partner present. About 19.7% of all households were made up of individuals and 10.5% had someone living alone who was 65 years of age or older.

There were 802 housing units, of which 4.0% were vacant. The homeowner vacancy rate was 1.2% and the rental vacancy rate was 0.0%.

=== 2000 census ===
As of the census of 2000, there were 2,430 people, 747 households, and 595 families residing in the CDP. The population density was 2,759.5/km^{2} (7,115.0/mi^{2}). There were 784 housing units at an average density of 890.3/km^{2} (2,295.5/mi^{2}). The racial makeup of the CDP was 7.41% White, 89.05% African American, 0.12% Native American, 0.21% Asian, 0.08% Pacific Islander, 1.15% from other races, and 1.98% from two or more races. Hispanic or Latino of any race were 2.63% of the population.

There were 747 households, out of which 37.8% had children under the age of 18 living with them, 42.3% were married couples living together, 30.8% had a female householder with no husband present, and 20.3% were non-families. 15.5% of all households were made up of individuals, and 4.6% had someone living alone who was 65 years of age or older. The average household size was 3.25 and the average family size was 3.58.

In the CDP, the population was spread out, with 33.5% under the age of 18, 9.5% from 18 to 24, 26.5% from 25 to 44, 23.0% from 45 to 64, and 7.4% who were 65 years of age or older. The median age was 30 years. For every 100 females, there were 93.6 males. For every 100 females age 18 and over, there were 80.0 males.

The median income for a household in the CDP was $32,568, and the median income for a family was $33,710. Males had a median income of $22,379 versus $20,027 for females. The per capita income for the CDP was $11,744. About 11.3% of families and 13.9% of the population were below the poverty line, including 16.4% of those under age 18 and 7.1% of those age 65 or over.

== Education ==
Tangelo Park is served by Orange County Public Schools. Education is provided through Tangelo Park Elementary School, Southwest Middle School, and Doctor Phillips High School.

In 1993, Harris Rosen "adopted" Tangelo Park, offering free preschool for children in the community and funding university and college educations for high school graduates from Tangelo Park. By 2013, he had donated about $10 million to the community. Speaking in 2015, the sheriff of Orange County described Tangelo Park as "a changed neighborhood", with a significant reduction in violent crime. Rosen recalled his first visit to an elementary school class in Tangelo Park at the start of the project, where only two or three children expressed a desire to go on to college, to which Rosen said "That has to change." When he returned and asked the same question a year later, "every hand went up".
