= Pointe Orlando =

Outdoor shopping center in Orlando, Florida

Coordinates: 28°25′57″N 81°28′13″W

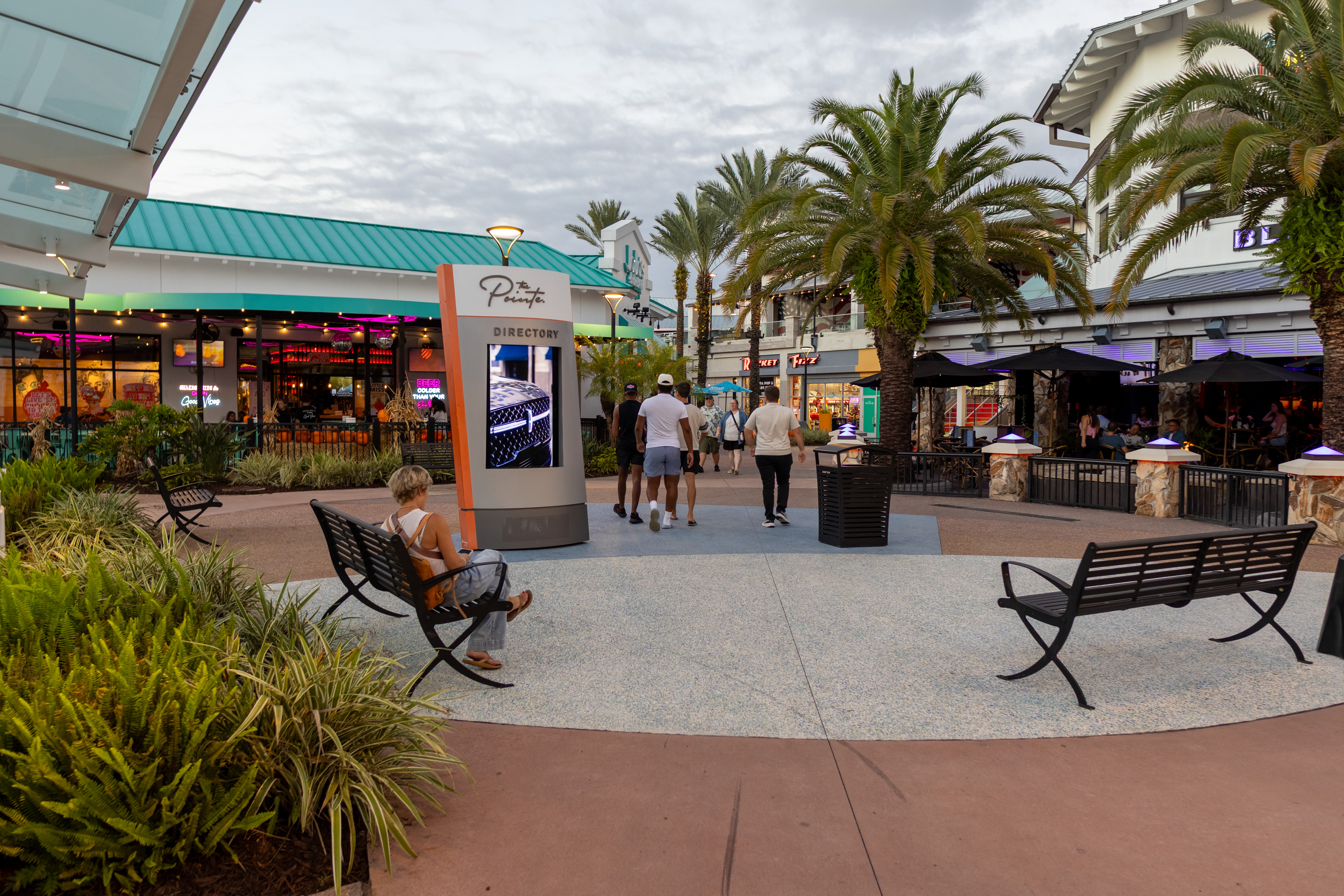
Pointe Orlando in October 2025

Pointe Orlando is an outdoor shopping center, located in Orlando, Florida. It is located at 9101 International Drive, adjacent to the Orange County Convention Center.

== History ==
Pointe Orlando originally opened on August 2, 1997 at a cost of $120 million, anchored by a flagship FAO Schwarz toy store. A Muvico cinema and IMAX theater, and a host of theme restaurants popular at the time opened later in the year and into 1998. The property was besieged by numerous delays in construction, with only a handful of businesses opening with the property. Several proposed restaurants, ranging from a Billboard Magazine-owned operation to an NFL-themed restaurant never materialized. Another anchor, a WonderWorks entertainment center, opened in 1998 and remains in operation.

A significant vacant plot of land existed near the property's entrance into 2000, originally intended for a Versace flagship store. XS, a Namco-owned entertainment center concept, opened on the land in 2001 in a standalone building.

Since opening, the property has experience significant tenant turnover, including the closure of FAO Schwarz in 2004. XS was rebranded as Pac-Man Cafe in 2004, only to close in 2005. Both closures led to a $40 million renovation of the property in 2005, which included the demolition of a majority of the International Drive-facing retail space to accommodate new tenants.

The renovation brought several new tenants to the property, including The Capital Grille and The Oceanaire Seafood Room in place of FAO Schwarz, a Maggiano's Little Italy in place of the Pac-Man Cafe, and a Tommy Bahama restaurant and retail store facing International Drive. The property's Muvico theaters were purchased by Regal Cinemas in 2007 and renovated in tandem with the mall renovation. The renovation sparked a brief renaissance at the property, but momentum wore off not soon after. Several prominent additions to the property as part of the 2005 renovation closed, including RA Sushi and Hooters, while Tommy Bahama relocated to the competing Disney Springs development in 2018.

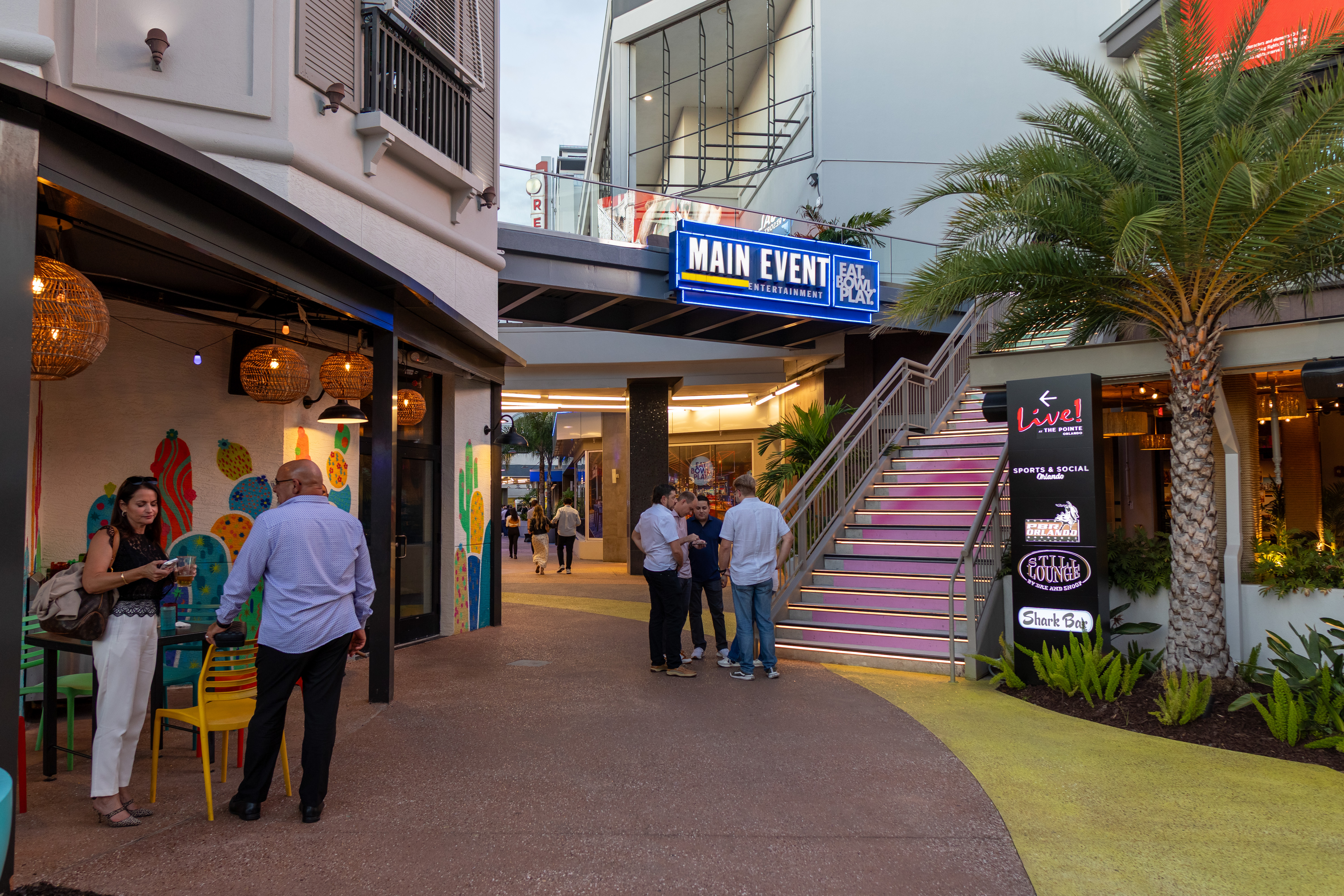
Main Event Entertainment location at The Pointe Orlando, pictured in October 2025

One major new addition occurred in 2016 with the addition of a Main Event Entertainment center, which took over 48,000 square-feet of vacant space at the property. However, business at the property continued to stagnate, leading to the announcement of an additional $32 million renovation project in 2019. The property would be renamed The Pointe upon completion of the renovation.
