= Florida State Road 536 =

State highway in Florida, United States

State Road 536
- World Center Drive

Route information
- Maintained by FDOT
- Length: 2.665 mi (4.289 km)
- Existed: October 1, 1982–present

Major junctions
- West end: Walt Disney World
- East end: SR 417 near Lake Buena Vista

Location
- Country: United States
- State: Florida
- Counties: Orange

Highway system
- Florida State Highway System; Interstate; US; State; Former; Pre‑1945; Toll; Scenic
← SR 535	→ SR 538

State Road 536 (SR 536), named World Center Drive for its entire length, is an east-west state highway that extends from Interstate 4 (I-4) near the EPCOT theme park to SR 417 in Lake Buena Vista.

== Route description ==
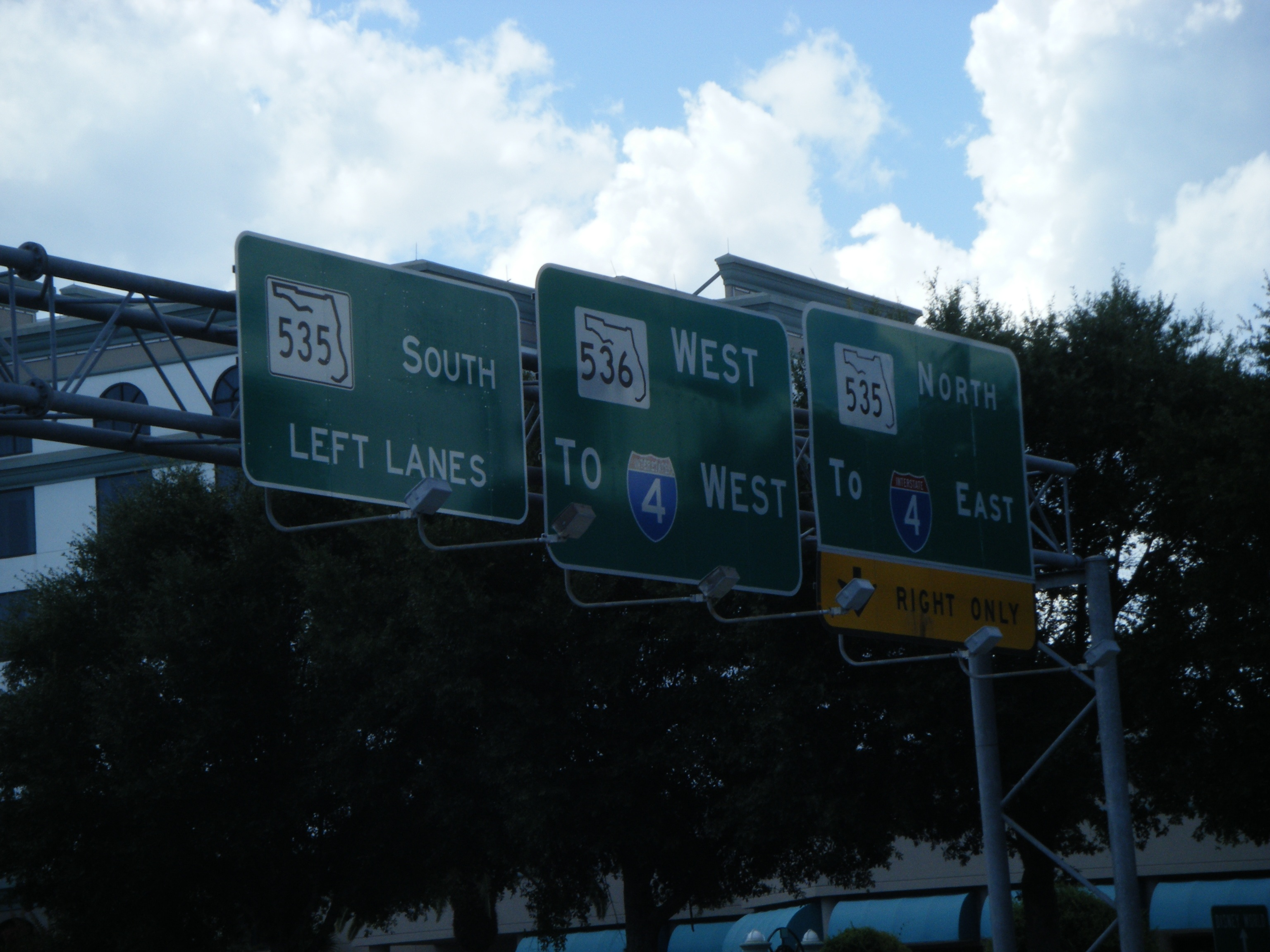
Overhead signs on westbound World Center Drive approaching the beginning of SR 536

SR 536 begins at an interchange with I-4/SR 400 in Lake Buena Vista, with the road continuing west into the Walt Disney World Resort as Epcot Center Drive and providing access to the EPCOT theme park section of Disney World. From this interchange it heads east as six-lane divided World Center Drive, passing by two resort hotels and a golf course before intersecting with SR 535. At this intersection, SR 536 ends, with World Center Drive continuing east to International Drive and providing access to an interchange with northbound SR 417 (Central Florida GreeneWay), with the westbound lanes coming from a southbound exit of the Greeneway.

== History ==
SR 536 was built in the early 1980s to serve the new EPCOT theme park, opened October 1, 1982. After the road was finished, all the land for it that had formerly been part of the Walt Disney World Resort was de-annexed from the City of Lake Buena Vista and the Reedy Creek Improvement District.

== Major intersections ==
The entire route is in Lake Buena Vista, Orange County.

mi	km	Destinations	Notes
0.000	0.000	Epcot Center Drive west – Walt Disney World	Western terminus; continues west as Epcot Center Drive
0.580	0.933	I-4 (SR 400) to US 192 – Orlando, Tampa	I-4 exit 67
2.034	3.273	SR 535 to I-4 – Kissimmee, Orlando	
2.665	4.289	International Drive / SR 417 north – International Airport, Sea World, Convention Center	Eastern terminus; SR 417 exit 6
1.000 mi = 1.609 km; 1.000 km = 0.621 mi
