= Rosen Jewish Community Center =

Community center in Orlando, Florida, U.S.

Coordinates: 28.4031°N 81.5044°W

- Rosen Jewish Community Center
- Location within Florida
- Formation: 1994; 32 years ago
- Region served: Orlando, Florida

The Rosen Jewish Community Center, sometimes abridged as Rosen JCC, is a community center serving Southwest Orlando, Florida's community. It was formerly known as the Jack & Lee Rosen Southwest Orlando Jewish Community Campus during its time as a satellite center operated by the Roth Family Jewish Community Center of Greater Orlando.

== Description and history ==
The Rosen Jewish Community Center (Rosen JCC) is a community center serving Southwest Orlando's community. The center's origins trace back to 1994, when the Roth Family Jewish Community Center of Greater Orlando (JCCGO) established the Early Childhood Learning Center on property belonging to the Southwest Orlando Jewish Congregation.

=== Jack & Lee Rosen Southwest Orlando Campus ===
In August 2009, a "full-service satellite" known as the Jack & Lee Rosen Southwest Orlando Campus opened, operating much like YMCA and offering expanded preschool, after-school and summer camp programs, plus a fitness center and sports leagues. Harris Rosen, founder of Rosen Hotels & Resorts and a local resident since the late 1960s, pledged $3.5 million for its first phase of construction and named the campus after his parents. According to the Jewish Federation of Greater Orlando, this marked the largest gift in the organization's history. In addition to Rosen, more than 220 families pledged donations; most contributions were $1,000 or higher, with several exceeding $10,000. In April 2006, JCC's board of directors moved to begin groundbreaking as soon as possible and the Federation's board of directors approved $400,000 for architectural, engineering, and impact fees, plus permit costs.

The 35,000-square-foot center features a gymnasium and aerobics facilities, dance studio, multi-purpose rooms, a space dedicated to its early childhood education program, an outdoor pavilion and concert hall, and playgrounds and sports fields. The campus also houses Theatre South at JCC, an arts center with classes for all ages and home of JCC's resident theatre company. Future plans for the 16-acre site on which the center stands included an auditorium, basketball and tennis courts, an outdoor swimming pool, snack bar, teen and senior centers, and spaces dedicated to an expanded early childhood education program.

=== Rosen Jewish Community Center ===
In 2014, the Harris Rosen Foundation confirmed plans to purchase the campus. Rosen had previously contributed $5.5 million for the project's construction. Effective June 1, 2015, the center began operating independently as the Rosen Jewish Community Center. Later that month, a groundbreaking ceremony was held for the second phase of an expansion project, which will include two additional wings. The 4,769-square-foot south wing will expand Rosen JCC's Early Childhood Learning Center by adding four classrooms and a parenting center and resource library. The 17,348-square-foot north wing will feature an auditorium, theater, and youth spaces. The auditorium will include an elevated stage, green room, and kitchen. Two private, soundproof music rooms will be added outside the auditorium. The youth area will feature a "Kid Zone" with child care services, three classrooms dedicated to an after school program called "J University", and two staff offices. The Early Childhood Learning Center will include an administrative office, three classrooms, and a parenting center and resource library. The original building's youth space will have "retrofitted enhancements" for teen and wellness programs, and the present youth wing will feature massage and physical therapy studios and a "private personal training zone". Rosen JCC also has plans for a room for indoor cycling and a center for teens with a "wellness-oriented" exergaming room. The expansion is expected to be completed in February 2016. In 2026, the center expanded it's services to offer kindergarten programs.

People with memberships to JCCGO have privileges to use the Rosen JCC, though the two centers operate as separate 501(c)(3) non-profit organizations. Annual events hosted by the center include the food festival "Taste of the J" and a Winter Festival featuring games, rides, sledding, and a snow park. In 2015, Rosen JCC held its inaugural gala and golf tournament at Orlando's Rosen Shingle Creek.
