= Rosen Shingle Creek =

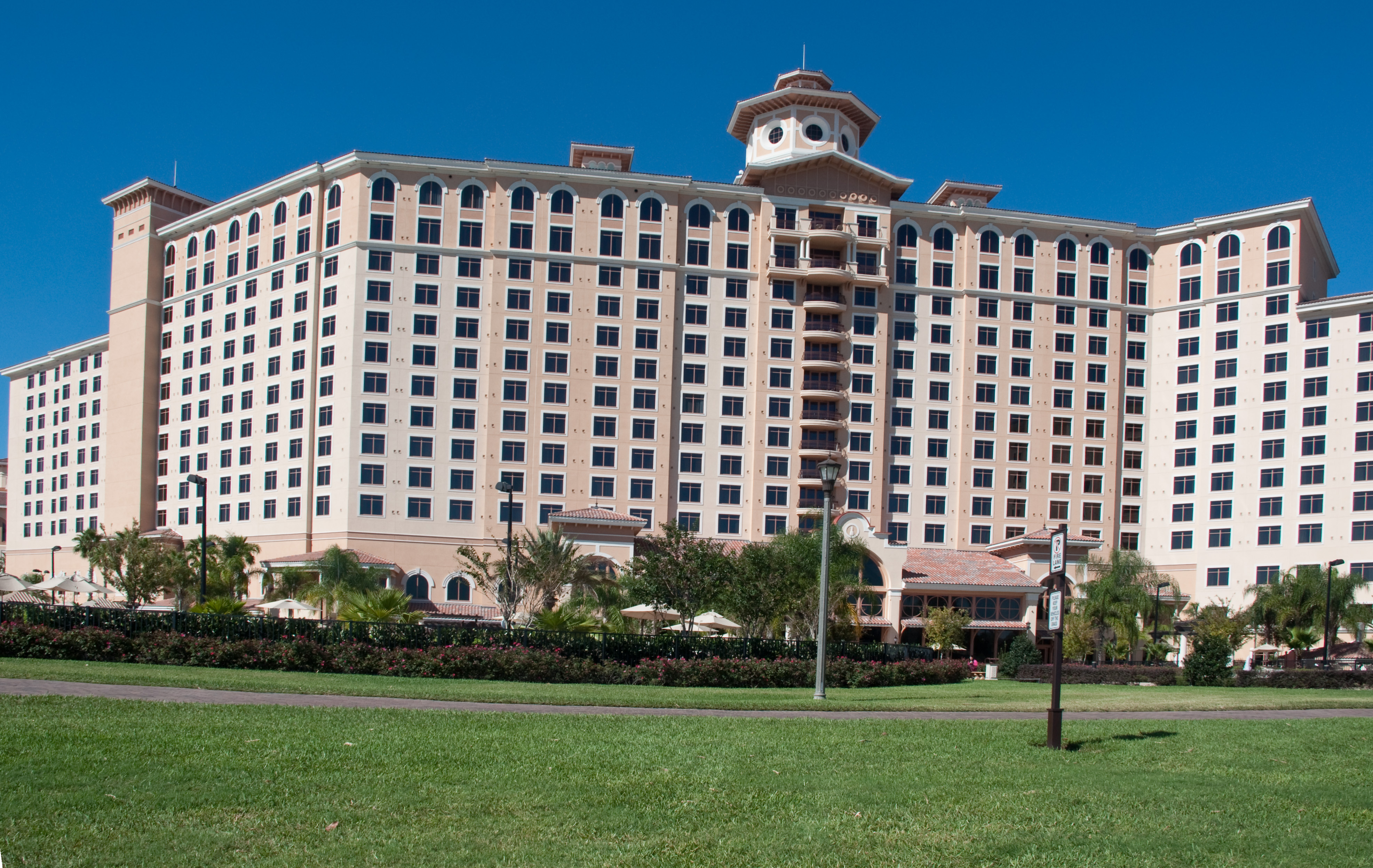
- Interactive map of the Rosen Shingle Creek area

General information
- Type: Hotel; Convention center Golf club
- Architectural style: Spanish revival
- Location: 9939 Universal Blvd, Orlando, Florida
- Coordinates: 28°25′32.484″N 81°26′5.1396″W
- Completed: September 9, 2006
- Owner: Rosen Hotels & Resorts

Technical details
- Floor count: 14

Other information
- Number of rooms: 1,501

Website
- Official website

Rosen Shingle Creek is a resort hotel, convention center, and golf club located in Orlando, Florida. The hotel opened in 2006 during the birthday of Harris Rosen, the founder of Rosen Hotels & Resorts, the company that owns and operates the hotel. The resort later hosted its first golf tournament on September 15, 2006 titled the "Shaq's Mama Said Knock You Out" Celebrity Charity Golf Tournament which was organized by Miami Heat Center player Shaquille O'Neal.

The resort features 524,000 square feet (48,700 m^{2}) of flexible event space along with an 18-hole par 72 championship golf course.
