= Ron Jon Surf Shop =

Surfer-style retail store chain

- Industry: Retail
- Founded: 1959; 67 years ago
- Founder: Ron DiMenna
- Headquarters: Cocoa Beach, Florida, U.S.
- Key people: Michele Goodwin (President)
- Products: Surfboards; Skateboards; Clothing; Home decor
- Website: ronjonsurfshop.com

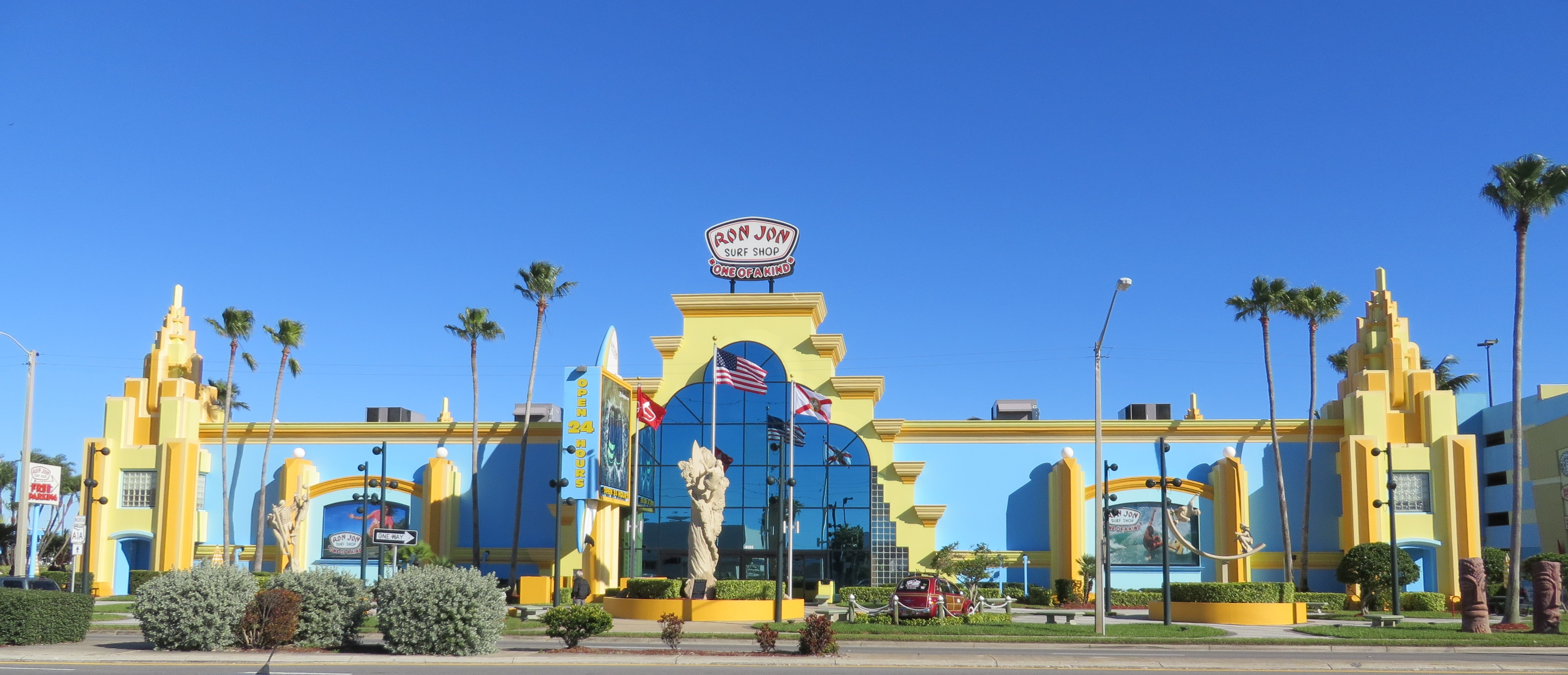
Ron Jon in Cocoa Beach

Ron Jon Surf Shop is a surfer-style retail store chain founded in 1959 in Ship Bottom, New Jersey, by Ron DiMenna. "The Original" Ron Jon Surf Shop opened in Long Beach Island, New Jersey in 1961. The store specializes in surfing and bodyboarding equipment, and their Cocoa Beach, Florida, store is currently the largest surf shop in the world. Michele Goodwin is the current president.

Ron Jon Surf Shop has 13 stores nationwide. In addition to the Ship Bottom and Cocoa Beach stores, Ron Jon also operates stores in Orange Beach, Alabama; Orlando, Pensacola, Key West, Fort Myers, Panama City Beach and Clearwater Beach, Florida; Myrtle Beach, South Carolina; Long Beach Island, New Jersey; and Ocean City, Maryland. There is also a store on Grand Turk and Cozumel, Mexico. A store in Orange, California, closed in early 2009. Another store in Sawgrass Mills in Sunrise, Florida, closed in 2019. The corporation also includes one Ron Jon Surf School separately owned and run by Craig Carroll, located in Cocoa Beach, Florida. The company made plans to construct a surf park at the location of the Orlando Ron Jon store, but it has since been canceled, due in part to the schematics for the pool being installed backwards.

The flagship store in Cocoa Beach is open daily and has over 52,000 square feet of retail space.

== In popular culture ==
Ruon-Jian is the name of a fictional character in the animated television series Avatar: The Last Airbender which aired on Nickelodeon between 2005 and 2008. His name (pronounced Ron-Jon) is humorously derived from the shop, as Ruon-Jian acts and looks like a stereotypical surfer.
