= Harris Rosen =

American businessman and investor (1939–2024)

- Born: September 9, 1939; New York City, U.S.
- Died: November 25, 2024 (aged 85); Orlando, Florida, U.S.
- Education: Cornell University (BS); University of Virginia
- Occupations: President and COO, Rosen Hotels & Resorts
- Years active: 1974–2024
- Website: Rosen Hotels & Resorts

Harris Rosen (September 9, 1939 – November 25, 2024) was an American businessman, investor, and philanthropist. He founded Rosen Hotels & Resorts in 1974, and served as the company's president and chief operating officer.

Rosen was widely known in the Central Florida area for his philanthropy, and was named the Orlando Sentinel's Central Floridian of the Year in 2011.

== Early life and education ==
Rosen was born in 1939 in Manhattan to Jack and Lee Rosen. He earned a Bachelor of Science degree from Cornell University School of Hotel Administration in 1961. He then served in the United States Army for three years in Germany and South Korea becoming a first lieutenant. Rosen, a descendant of Russian Jewish immigrants, devoted significant resources to the local Jewish community, donating to and renaming the Jack and Lee Rosen Southwest Orlando Jewish Community Center in 2015.

== Career ==
Rosen began his career at the Waldorf Astoria in New York City as a convention salesman. He also worked at other hotels including various Hilton Hotels and the New Yorker Hotel. Rosen eventually joined the Walt Disney Company as director of hotel planning.

During the height of the 1973 oil crisis, Rosen left Disney and purchased his first hotel, a Quality Inn on International Drive in southwest Orlando. To market his hotel during this period, Rosen hitchhiked to New England and met with several motor coach companies to gain their Central Florida business. At the end of one trip, one company offered him a return trip ride with a couple traveling to Florida, if he would provide them accommodations there. That purchase marked the beginning of Rosen Hotels & Resorts.

In 2006, Rosen opened the 1501-room Rosen Shingle Creek, an AAA Four Diamond hotel, his first resort.

In October 2017, Rosen purchased the Clarion International Drive and the Red Roof Inn International Drive. The next year, he consolidated both hotels under the Midpointe Hotel name. Rosen Hotels & Resorts currently owns and operates seven hotels and resorts in the Orlando metropolitan area. The company administers 6,694 guestrooms, has 4,500 employees, and is valued at over $500 million.

== Philanthropy ==
Rosen's philanthropic efforts began in 1993, when he created the Tangelo Park Program to benefit an impoverished Orlando community of the same name. The three-pronged program includes his promise of college scholarships (including room, board, books, and tuition) for members of the community who are accepted to vocational school, college or university in the state of Florida. The program includes a parent resource center and ten neighborhood preschools. As of 2016, more than 200 college degrees have been awarded through this program. For more than ten years, Rosen funded an alternative spring break for about a dozen Cornell students who wish to spend their vacation in Orlando, staying in one of his hotels and mentoring students who live in Tangelo Park.

In the spring of 2016, Rosen announced a program similar to the Tangelo Park Program, albeit five times as large, to benefit the Parramore District near downtown Orlando. The program started with Parramore residents who graduated high school in 2016. In addition, Rosen funded the building and maintenance of a 24-room preschool housed at the Orange County Public Schools Academic Center for Excellence in Parramore which opened in August 2017. Rosen funded 48 teachers' and aides' salaries, as well as the salaries of two directors.

In November 2017, Rosen announced a partnership with Rollins College, a private, liberal arts college in Winter Park, to provide three annual scholarships to the school to be shared by Tangelo Park and Parramore high school graduates.

In 2002, Rosen donated $18 million to the University of Central Florida to develop the Rosen College of Hospitality Management. He funded hundreds of scholarships annually to students attending the Rosen College.

Rosen funded sending medical supplies and personal hygiene items to Haiti. In 2006, he hosted the Water for Haiti gala at Rosen Plaza which funded more than 200 water filtration devices. He has also committed to rebuilding hurricane damaged homes—more than 100—which were completed in December 2017. Rosen served as a charter member of the University of Central Florida Board of Trustees.

== Personal life and death ==
Rosen married his wife, Trisha, and they had four children together: Adam, Jack, Joshua, and Shayna. He cheated on his wife, which resulted in their divorce. Rosen lost his youngest son, Adam, to a gioblastoma in November 2018. He set up a foundation in Adam's name and donated $12 million to fund brain tumor research at the University of Florida.

Rosen died on November 25, 2024, as a result of a botched surgery in Orlando at the age of 85 following complications related to a brief battle with ampullary cancer.

== Awards ==
In 2016, Rosen was awarded the Bob Graham Center for Public Service Citizen of the Year award for his work with Tangelo Park. He was also named the most influential person in tourism in Orlando by Orlando magazine. In November 2017, Rosen was honored by the Orlando Business Journal as the Philanthropist of the Year. The International Drive Chamber of Commerce also named an award in Rosen's name—The Harris Rosen Philanthropy Award—which he received in November 2017. It is awarded annually to those exemplifying his passion for philanthropy. In June 2022, Rosen was recognized by the International Hospitality Institute on the list of the Global 100 in Hospitality as one of the 100 Most Powerful People in Global Hospitality.

== See also ==
- Rosen Jewish Community Center
