= Clearwater Beach =

Beach in Pinellas County, Florida

Coordinates: 27°58′48″N 82°49′38″W

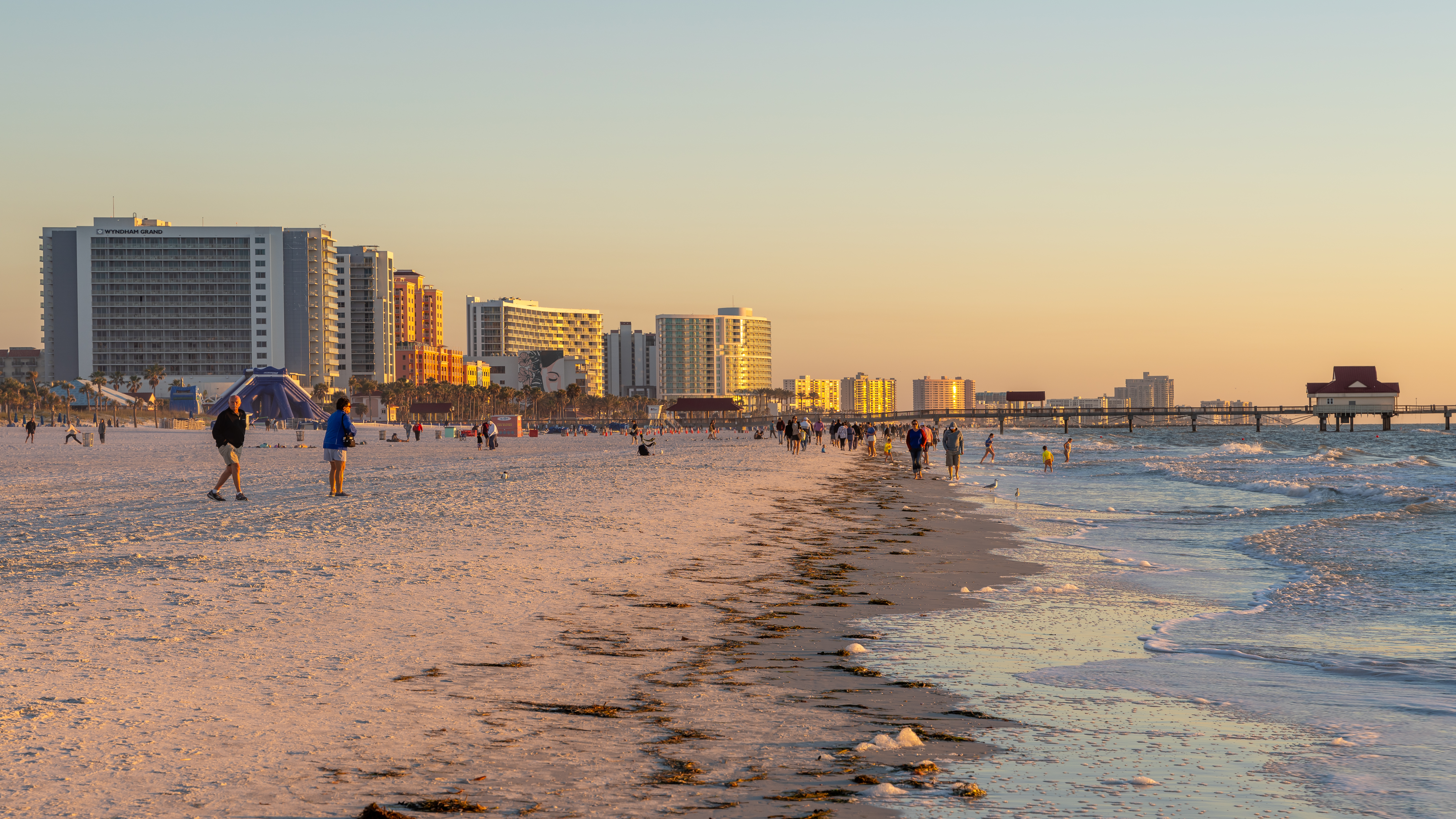
Sunset on Clearwater Beach (2025)

Clearwater Beach is a beach located in Clearwater, Florida, United States, on a barrier island in the Gulf of Mexico. It is situated just west of the rest of the city over the Intracoastal Waterway, and is connected to it by way of the Clearwater Memorial Causeway.

Clearwater Beach is characterized by white sand beaches and clear blue water stretching for 2.5 miles (4 km) along the Gulf and sits on a barrier island. It has a full marina on the Intracoastal Waterway side and is linked on the south by a short bridge to another barrier island called Sand Key, where Sand Key Park is located.

The area offers shopping, restaurants, and activities such as parasailing, jet ski rentals, boat tours (with a common sighting of dolphins in the Gulf waters), miniature golf, fishing charters, and "pirate ship" cruises.

Clearwater is consistently ranked one of the best beaches in the United States. Its Sandpearl resort was named one of the best beach resorts in the U.S. In January 2013, Clearwater Beach was awarded the designation of Florida's Best Beach Town by a USA Today reader poll ranking 10 Florida beach destinations. In February 2019, Clearwater Beach was named the best beach in the United States and sixth-best in the world by TripAdvisor.

== Climate ==
With an annual mean temperature of around 75 °F (24 °C), Clearwater Beach has a climate that borders on humid subtropical and tropical savanna. Clearwater Beach experiences hot and humid summers (although somewhat tempered, due to the sea breeze off the Gulf of Mexico) with frequent thunderstorms; and warm, but drier winters. The area experiences a significant summer wet season, as nearly two-thirds of the annual precipitation falls in the months of June through September. The area is listed by the United States Department of Agriculture (USDA) as being in hardiness zone 10, which is about the northern limit of where coconut palms and royal palms can be grown. Highs usually range between 67 to 89 °F (19 to 32 °C) year-round.

Climate data for Clearwater Beach, FL
Month	Jan	Feb	Mar	Apr	May	Jun	Jul	Aug	Sep	Oct	Nov	Dec	Year
Mean daily maximum °F (°C)	67.3 (19.6)	73.3 (22.9)	74.6 (23.7)	78.9 (26.1)	83.3 (28.5)	86.9 (30.5)	88.5 (31.4)	89.1 (31.7)	87.7 (30.9)	83.9 (28.8)	75.8 (24.3)	71.2 (21.8)	80.0 (26.7)
Mean daily minimum °F (°C)	54.9 (12.7)	61.0 (16.1)	63.3 (17.4)	68.1 (20.1)	73.1 (22.8)	77.9 (25.5)	78.3 (25.7)	78.6 (25.9)	76.3 (24.6)	72.7 (22.6)	64.4 (18.0)	59.1 (15.1)	69.0 (20.6)
Average precipitation inches (mm)	2.45 (62)	3.03 (77)	3.55 (90)	2.16 (55)	2.27 (58)	5.62 (143)	8.83 (224)	8.50 (216)	7.22 (183)	2.90 (74)	2.25 (57)	2.84 (72)	51.62 (1,311)

Average sea temperature:
Jan	Feb	Mar	Apr	May	Jun	Jul	Aug	Sep	Oct	Nov	Dec	Year
63.9 °F (17.7 °C)	64.2 °F (17.9 °C)	67.8 °F (19.9 °C)	73.8 °F (23.2 °C)	79.2 °F (26.2 °C)	84.0 °F (28.9 °C)	86.2 °F (30.1 °C)	86.5 °F (30.3 °C)	84.7 °F (29.3 °C)	79.9 °F (26.6 °C)	72.1 °F (22.3 °C)	67.5 °F (19.7 °C)	75.8 °F (24.3 °C)

== Transportation ==
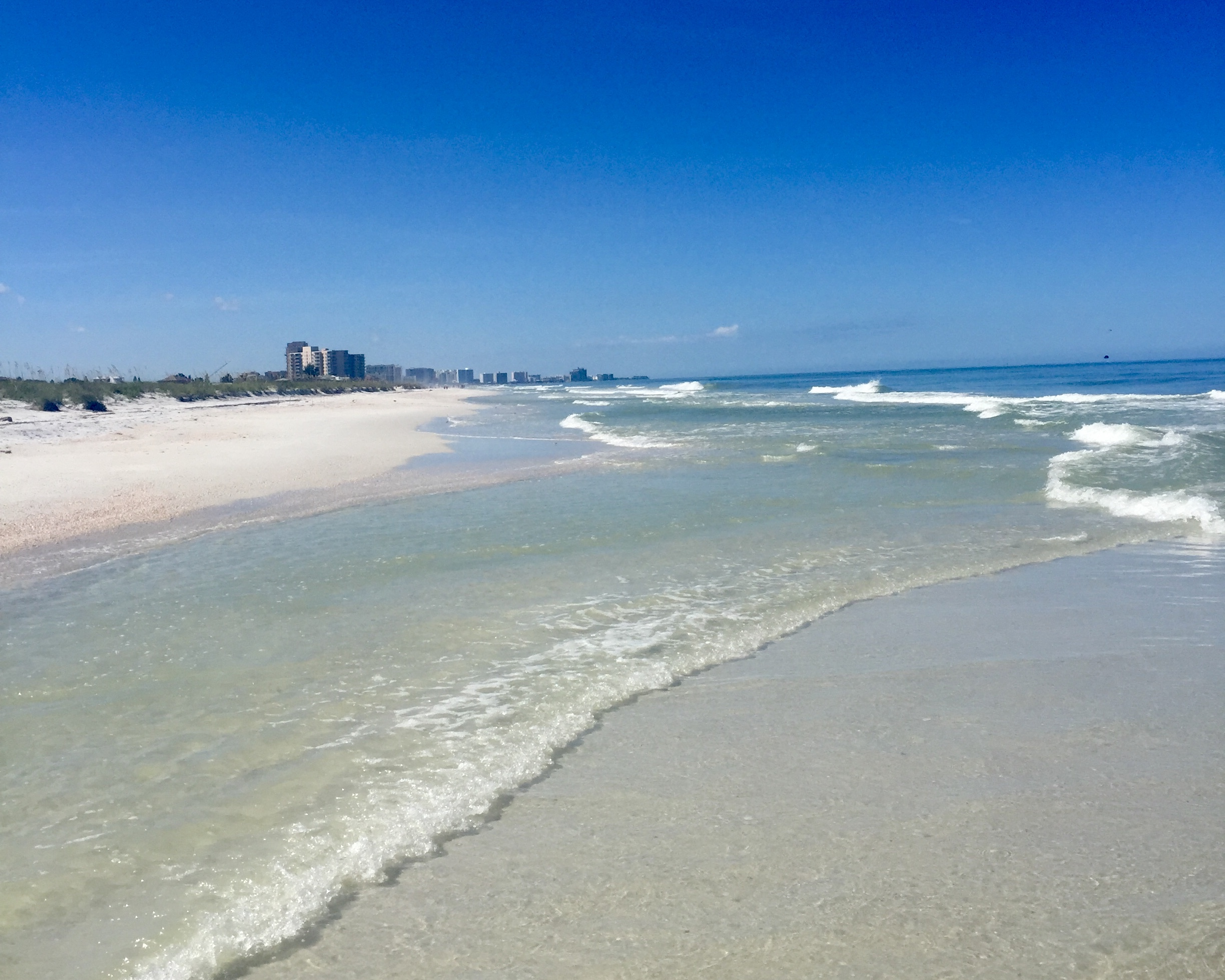
North Clearwater Beach

Clearwater Beach is approximately 20 miles (30 km) from Tampa International Airport and 25 miles (40 km) from downtown Tampa.

St. Pete-Clearwater International Airport is also within close proximity of Clearwater Beach.

The Clearwater Jolley Trolley has provided transportation up and down the beach since 1982. It currently runs to North Clearwater Beach and down to Sand Key, including Island Estates. Mandalay Avenue is the main drag on the north end of the beach with Gulfview Boulevard being so on the south. Both areas feature a variety of businesses.

== Recreation, entertainment, and shopping ==
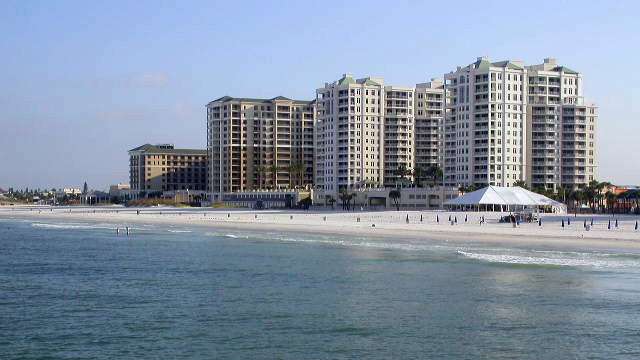
Clearwater Beach looking North from Pier 60

Pier 60, named for State Road 60 which terminates in Clearwater Beach, is a central spot for beachgoers and has a playground, a snack bar with attached souvenir shop, and a long fishing pier. There are professional entertainers who perform on the pier every day, along with children's acts. It's the site of a daily event called Sunsets at Pier 60, which includes street performers and musical acts. On the pier itself is a nightly display of goods sold by local artisans such as jewelry, candles, and other gift items.

Numerous restaurants and shops can be found adjacent to the beach, whose attractiveness was greatly improved in recent years with a beautification project called Beach Walk. The Beach Walk is located just south of Pier 60. There are drinking fountains, shower nozzles for beachcombers to rinse the sand off, and bicycle racks, as part of the upgrade. It also is a great spot for fishing. Beach "renourishment" efforts such as dune restoration enhance the area's natural beauty along a wide curving sidewalk. In addition, directly across from the pier is the Clearwater Municipal Marina, which offers deep sea fishing and boating activities for visitors.

In July 2008, the long-anticipated Beach Walk project was completed, featuring a compact pedestrian zone with high-end hotels and condos. The beach is also known for its nightlife scene.

Shephard's Beach Resort and the Palm Pavilion Inn are two of the area's popular night spots. There are also several Frenchy's restaurant locations and retail stores including Surf Style and Ron Jon Surf Shop.

A paved bicycle trail lined by mangrove trees is available nearby which parallels the Clearwater Memorial Causeway to the city.

Just up the causeway from the Beach, in the Island Estates area, is the Clearwater Marine Aquarium (home of Winter, the bottlenose dolphin featured in the movie Dolphin Tale), as well as a grocery store and other amenities.

== See also ==
- St. Pete Beach
- Treasure Island
