= Ford's Garage =

American chain of restaurants

Ford's Garage USA
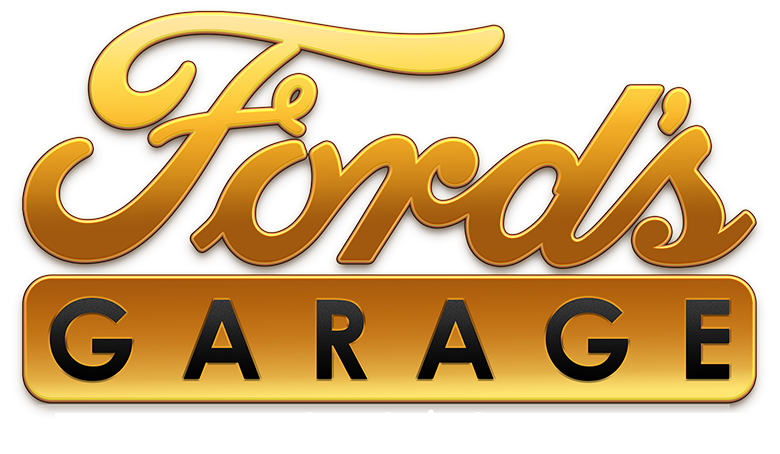

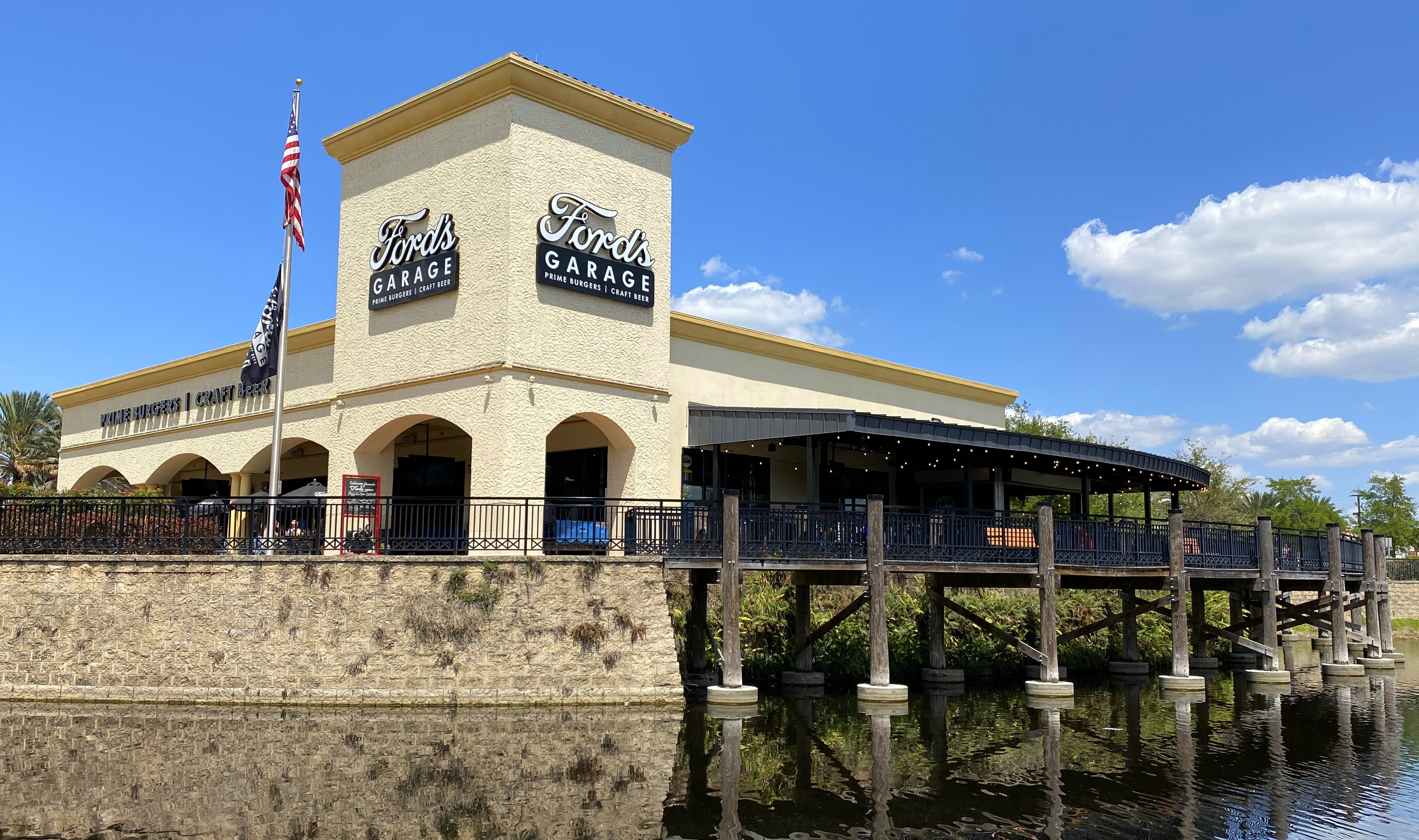
- Ford's Garage restaurant in Orlando, Florida
- Trade name: Ford's Garage
- Type: Private
- Industry: Restaurant
- Genre: Casual dining
- Founded: 2012; 14 years ago in Fort Myers, Florida
- Founder: Mike McGuigan; Daniel Kearns
- Headquarters: 505 E Jackson Street; Tampa, Florida; United States
- Number of locations: 32 (2025)
- Area served: Florida; Michigan; Indiana; Ohio; Texas; Kentucky; New Jersey (future); New York; Virginia; Tennessee
- Key people: Steve Shlemon President; Marc Brown, Franchisee
- Products: Burgers, Appetizers, Soups, Comfort Foods, Mac and Cheese, Sandwiches, Milkshakes, Alcoholic Beverages, Soft Drinks
- Revenue: ▲US$105.6 million (FY February 25, 2021)
- Owner: Icon Restaurant Group
- Website: fordsgarageusa.com

Ford's Garage is an American indie chain of casual dining restaurants founded in 2012. The first restaurant was opened in Fort Myers, Florida. As of July 2025, the company has 32 restaurants in 8 states, the majority of which are operated by 23 Restaurant Services. The chain has a licensing agreement with the Ford Motor Company that allows it to use the Ford name and the carmaker's logo.

== History ==
In 2012, co-founders Mike McGuigan, president of McGuigan Restaurant Concepts and Daniel Kearns, President of the Kearns Restaurant Group as well as his son, Zak Kearns opened the first Ford's Garage restaurant in Fort Myers, Florida. In May 2013, the company applied to trademark its name as Ford's Garage Venture LLC. The U.S. Patent and Trademark Office denied the application, because the name was too similar to the trademark held by the Ford Motor Company. One year later in 2014, the restaurant chain signed a deal with the Ford Motor Company enabling it to use Ford's trademark "Blue Oval" logo and other insignia in its restaurants.

In 2017, Ford's Garage opened their first restaurant outside Florida in Dearborn, Michigan, the birthplace of the motor company's founder Henry Ford. The restaurant in Dearborn is located within the property of the Ford Motor Company and is less than two miles away from the company's international headquarters. In 2023, the company opened a restaurant in Florence, Kentucky. In 2024, their first New York location opened at the Smith Haven Mall in Lake Grove, New York. In 2025, the chain made plans to open three locations in New Jersey, beginning with a location at Menlo Park Mall in Edison. In 2026, Ford's Garage opened its other new location at the Hamilton Place Mall in Chattanooga, Tennessee.

== Sister restaurants ==
Ford's Garage's sister restaurants include Yeoman's Topgolf Swing Suite, Tiki Docks, Don The Beachcomber, The Firestone, Capone's Coal Fired Pizza, Cabos Cantina, The Lodge, The Boathouse Tiki Bar & Grill, The downtown social house, Izzy’s Fish & Oyster, and Bimini Bait Shack all located in Florida.
