= International Drive =

Thoroughfare in Orlando, Florida, United States

Coordinates: 28.4171999°N 81.4598421°W

- I-Drive
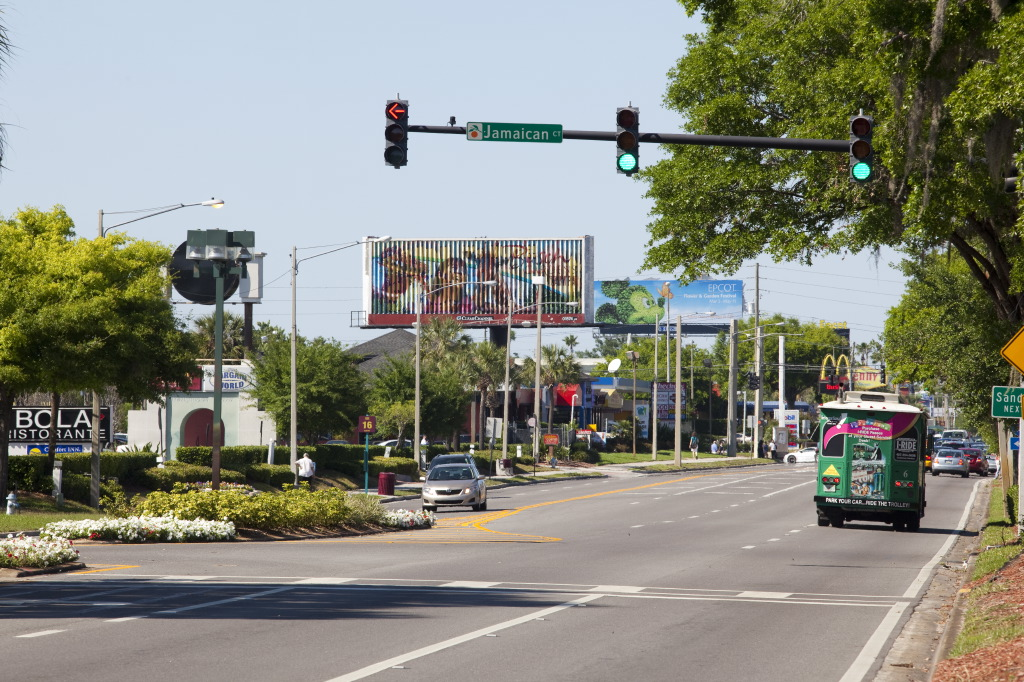
- International Drive, Orlando FL (April 2011)
- Interactive map of International Drive
- Length: 11.1 mi (17.9 km)
- South end: US 192 (Irlo Bronson Highway)
- Major junctions: SR 528 (Beachline Expressway); SR 482 (Sand Lake Road); SR 435 (Kirkman Road)
- North end: Oak Ridge Road

International Drive, commonly known as I-Drive, is a major 11.1-mile (17.9 km) thoroughfare in Orlando, Florida, United States, and is the city's main tourist strip. I-Drive is located several miles southwest of Downtown Orlando in the southernmost limits of the city. The International Drive area serves a similar purpose to that of the Las Vegas Strip in Las Vegas as the core of the tourism area.

== Route description ==
International Drive stretches approximately 11.1 miles, with the northern part extending into the southernmost city limits of Orlando and the remainder of the central and southern portion located in unincorporated Orange County. An additional extension which does not directly intersect with the main section of International Drive is known as International Drive South, partly located in the northern portion of Osceola County. Surrounding cross-roads include Sand Lake Road, Kirkman Road, SR 536, and Universal Boulevard, which runs parallel to the midsection of International Drive.

I-Drive has four lanes, two in each direction, from its north end at Oak Ridge Road to Pointe Plaza Drive (former Universal Blvd. south end; see below), and again between the northern and southern intersections with Westwood Blvd. It has six lanes, three in each direction, from Pointe Plaza Drive to the Beachline Expressway (the eastbound ramps to the Beachline tie into the northern intersection with Westwood Blvd.), and again from the southern intersection with Westwood Blvd. to its end at SR 536. The entirety of International Drive South, from SR 535 to US 192, is entirely six lanes. The section of I-Drive from Universal Blvd. to Sand Lake Road has no median or center turn lane, and frequently has heavy traffic and gridlock in the evenings in the tourism corridor, affecting Carrier Drive and Sand Lake Road.

The International Drive area is home to the wax museum Madame Tussauds, the Orange County Convention Center complex, the Pointe Orlando entertainment complex, major hotels, SeaWorld Orlando, Aquatica (SeaWorld's water park), Fun Spot America amusement park, the Orlando Eye Ferris wheel, the world's tallest StarFlyer (opened June 1, 2018), the world's tallest Slingshot, the World's Largest Entertainment McDonald's, CoCo Key Hotel & Water Resort, the I-Drive 360 entertainment complex, museums, themed restaurants, bars, outlet malls, mini golf courses like Pirate's Cove Adventure Golf and other tourism-related commercial properties and tourist attractions such as Air Florida Helicopter Inc and Wonder Works. The major theme park resort Universal Orlando is also located in the area. Wet n' Wild was a water park formerly located on International Drive, considered to be America's first water park until it closed on December 31, 2016 to make way for Universal's Endless Summer Hotels.

=== Public transportation ===
The I-Ride Trolley system operated by the International Drive Business Improvement District provides bus transportation along the I-Drive Resort Area primarily for tourists, convention attendees, and locals alike. Several Lynx public bus routes also serve the I-Drive area with routes to Orlando International Airport, Downtown Orlando and other parts of the city.

== History ==
The first section of I-Drive was laid out in the 1960s by attorney Finley Hamilton to serve his Hilton Inn South, opened in May 1970. He imagined that once Walt Disney World opened in October 1971, tourists would spot the hotel when traveling to the park along Interstate 4.

They called the hotel 'Finley's Folly' – everyone, all of my friends. They said it was in the boondocks... But it turned out to be highly successful... I came up with International Drive, because it sounded big and important.

International Drive was eventually extended to its current north point (where Prime Outlets is now) and southward past the Beachline Expressway.

The International Drive Master Transit and Improvement District was created in 1992 to provide growth management, transportation, and infrastructure development for the area with collaboration between the local governments and I-Drive businesses. One of the most critical projects presented to the organization is to create an efficient transportation system for tourists on the I-Drive strip; this prompted the creation of the I-Ride bus trolley system.

== Universal Boulevard ==
Universal Boulevard runs roughly parallel to International Drive from the Beachline Expressway north, then crosses I-Drive and intersects I-4 via an overpass into the Universal Orlando Resort. Originally built as Republic Drive, it originally stopped at International Drive and fed into ramps onto and off I-4 eastbound. In 1998, the extension north into Universal Studios was opened (in preparation for the opening of Islands of Adventure in 1999), and the road was renamed to Universal Blvd. The intersection at I-4 still only has ramps onto and off I-4 eastbound; the ramps on westbound I-4 connect not to Universal Blvd., but to Hollywood Way, necessitating a right turn to get to Universal Blvd.

Southbound, it originally fed into International Drive just north of the Orange County Convention Center (the current West Building). The north corner of the intersection is now the Pointe Orlando shopping district. When the North Building (then Phase V) of the OCCC was planned, it was also planned to extend Universal Boulevard along its current alignment on the north side of the North Building. Plans were made in conjunction with the Williamsburg subdivision to design the intersection at the Beachline Expressway so that traffic would not inadvertently clog Orangewood Boulevard, which already met the Beachline at that point (Exit 2). The extension was opened in early 2003, and the old connector to I-Drive at Pointe Orlando was renamed Pointe Plaza Avenue. An electric sign system on the Beachline directs convention-goers to the proper road so as to avoid unnecessary traffic on I-Drive.

Universal Boulevard has fewer businesses, thus much less traffic serving as an overflow exit road for the Orange County Convention Center during major events. Several planned communities and extended-stay business apartments are planned for the corridor, including the Village of Imagine, across from the OCCC North Building. The University of Central Florida opened the off-campus Rosen College of Hospitality Management, funded by local hotelier Harris Rosen, in 2005 at Universal Blvd. and the Beachline. Universal Blvd. is currently six lanes from Vineland Rd. southbound to International Drive, then four lanes southbound to Pointe Plaza Ave., then six lanes again to the Beachline. Only one lane in each direction passes under the Beachline to connect to Orangewood Blvd., which is four lanes on the other side.

== Major junctions ==
County	Location	mi	km	Destinations	Notes
Osceola		0.0	0.0	US 192 to I-4 – Old Town, Celebration	
Osceola		0.9	1.4	CR 522 (Osceola Parkway) to I-4 / Florida's Turnpike – Disney World, Int’l Airport	
Orange		3.0	4.8	SR 535 to I-4	
Orange	Gap in route				
Orange		3.0	4.8	SR 536 (World Center Drive) to SR 535 / SR 417 north / I-4 – Int’l Airport	SR 417 exit 6
Orange		7.4	11.9	Central Florida Parkway	Access to SeaWorld
Orange		8.4	13.5	SR 528 (Beachline Expressway) – Int’l Airport, Cocoa	SR 528 exit 1
Orange		10.8	17.4	SR 482 (Sand Lake Road)	
Orange	Orlando	12.2	19.6	SR 435 (Kirkman Road) – Universal Studios	
Orange	Orlando	13.3	21.4	Oak Ridge Road	
Orange	Orlando	13.3	21.4	Orlando International Premium Outlets	
1.000 mi = 1.609 km; 1.000 km = 0.621 mi
