= Orange County Convention Center =

Convention center in Orlando, Florida

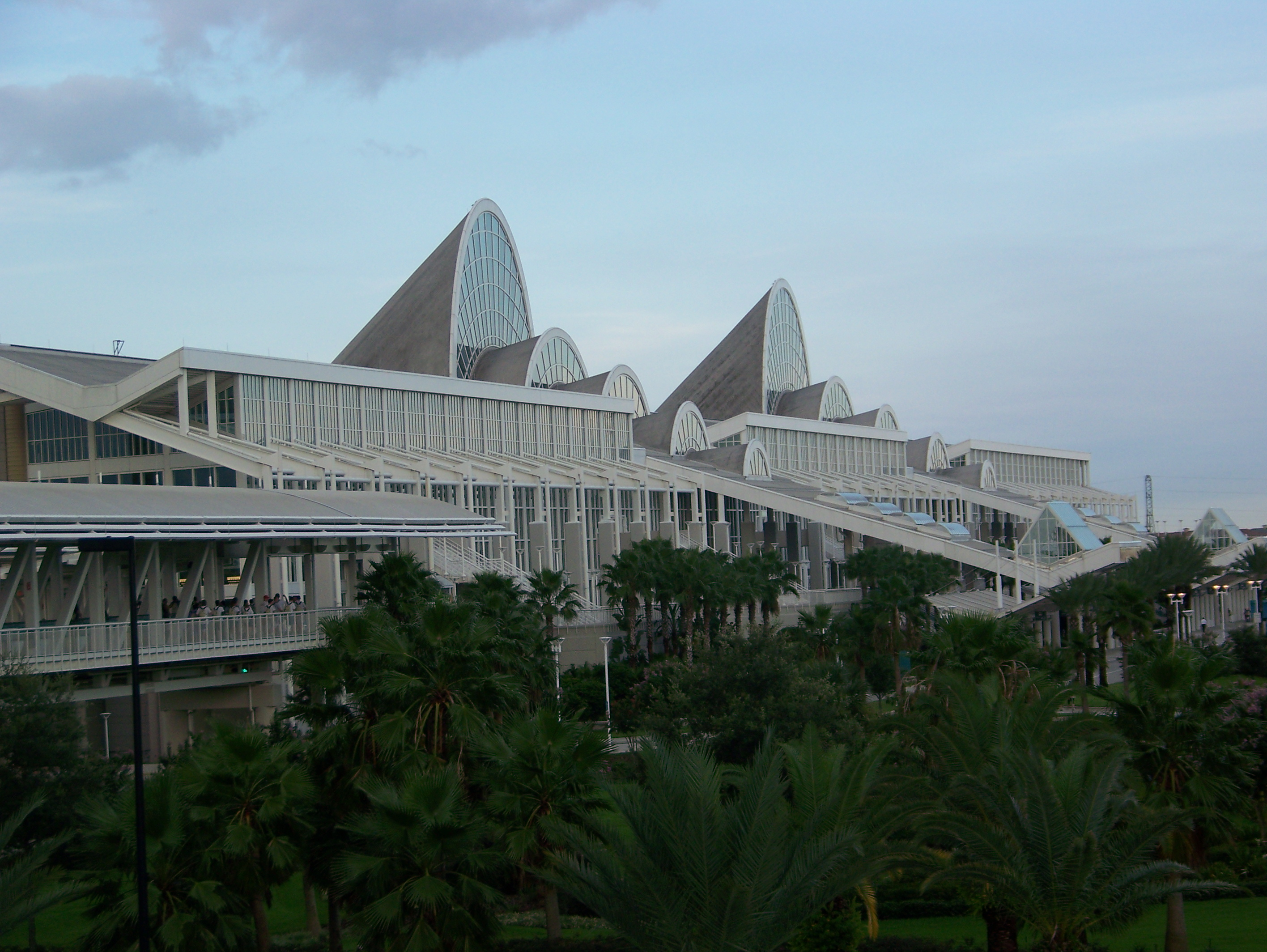
- North concourse of convention center (c.2007)
- Former names: Orange County Convention and Civic Center (1983-92)
- Address: 9860 Universal Blvd; Orlando, FL 32819-8706
- Location: Convention Center District
- Coordinates: 28.4271846°N 81.4639235°W
- Owner: Orange County Government
- Capacity: 2,643 (Chapin Theater); 4,882 (Tangerine Ballroom); 6,000 (Valencia Ballroom)
- Public transit: 8, 38, 42, 58, 111

Construction
- Opened: February 26, 1983
- Renovated: 1987-89, 1990, 1996-97, 1998, 2000-03, 2008
- Cost: $54 million ($211 million in 2025 dollars)

Website
- Venue website

The Orange County Convention Center is a convention center located in Orlando, Florida. Opened in 1983 as the Orange County Convention and Civic Center, it is the primary public convention center for the Central Florida region and the second-largest convention center in the United States, after McCormick Place in Chicago.

The OCCC offers 7,000,000 sq ft (650,000 m^{2}) of space, 2,100,000 sq ft (200,000 m^{2}) of which is exhibit space. The complex is located on the south end of International Drive, a major tourist area in Orlando.

The original building (the "West Concourse") housed an 11,300-seat arena from 1983 to 1992. It hosted concerts by popular artists including Madonna, Tina Turner, Whitney Houston, Run-DMC, The Beastie Boys, Def Leppard, Tesla, Styx, Aerosmith, Mötley Crüe, and Hall and Oates. Its use declined after the Orlando Arena opened in 1989. The arena closed in 1992 and was renovated and converted into the main exhibition hall in 1996.

On April 18, 2012, the American Institute of Architects's Florida Chapter placed the building on its list of "Florida Architecture: 100 Years. 100 Places". Solar panels on the roof of the South Concourse provide 1 MW of power.

The OCCC says it hosts events attracting about 1.5 million people annually, injecting $2.5 billion into the Central Florida economy. Of the hundreds of events hosted annually, they include IAAPA Expo and MegaCon.

== History ==
The Orange County Convention and Civic Center (OCCCC) was born out of a 1977 law passed by Florida's State Legislature. The law permit counties to collect a "Tourist Development Tax" on top of regular sales tax on hotel room stays, with the approval of the county's voters, for state-approved purposes. In a special election in April 1978, the voters of Orange County approved a 2% Tourist Development Tax (the limit set by the state) to build a convention and civic center. That August, the Orange County Board of County Commissioners (BCC) approved a location for the OCCCC in Orlando Central Park, on International Drive, and drew up plans for a 325,000 sq ft (30,200 m^{2}) gross area facility. The following year, BCC and Orlando Central Park agreed to give OCP one cent per taxed dollar of the Tourist Development Tax (TDT) each year for 30 years; in return, OCP would donate land for the initial facility, give the county an option to buy another 45 acres (18 ha) for future expansion, and commit adjacent lands for hotel and tourist development.

Phase I was completed on February 25, 1983, at a cost of $54 million. The Boston Pops Orchestra played at the grand opening on February 26, 1983, and 14,000 people attended the open house on February 27, 1983. This initial building is now Hall D of the present building and its lobby.

In June 1984, the BCC exercised its 45-acre (18 ha) option for $2 million and began planning Phase II. The TDT was raised to 3% by a state law in 1986, and groundbreaking occurred in February 1987 on Phase II. It was completed in January 1989, adding 150,000 sq ft (14,000 m^{2}) of exhibition space to increase it to 344,790 sq ft (32,032 m^{2}) of total exhibition space, and adding 100,000 sq ft (9,300 m^{2}) of meeting and support space. This phase makes up Halls E-F of the current building and adjacent meeting space.

That same month, an additional 1% was permitted for the TDT, increasing it to 4%. The BCC approved an additional three phases to the OCCCC (Phases IIA, III and IV), and improvements to the Citrus Bowl, its first non-Convention Center TDT project.

Phase IIA, completed in December 1990, added 100,000 sq ft (9,300 m^{2}) more support space, used largely for office space and registration. The next month, planning for Phase III was begun. By December 1992, "Civic" was dropped from the name, and the facility became the Orange County Convention Center. Phase III added Halls B and C of the current building as well as the Valencia Ballroom and Chapin Theater.

Phase III was completed in January 1996, adding 383,400 sq ft (35,620 m^{2}) of exhibition space, at a cost of $219.5 million. Phase IV followed that August at a cost of $198.7 million, adding another 367,200 sq ft (34,110 m^{2}) of exhibition space and about 100,000 sq ft (9,300 m^{2}) more meeting space. A retrofit of Phase I, completed in December 1997 at a cost of $32 million, opened up 8,200 sq ft (760 m^{2}) more. By 1998, the OCCC had 1,103,538 sq ft (102,522.0 m^{2}) of exhibition space over a total building space of over 4 million ft² with the newly added Hall A.

In June 1998, the BCC got a fifth cent approved for the TDT, partly for a grand Phase V, which would add a total of 3 million ft² of space to the OCCC. That December, they paid Universal Orlando Resort $69 million for 239 acres (97 ha) of land across International Drive from the original OCCC. The Martinez Convention Center Commission, named after then-Orange County chairman Mel Martinez, was created to oversee planning and construction of Phase V.

Ground was broken on Phase V in August 2000 after a large convention organizer, Reed Exhibitions, agreed to move 42 conventions to Orlando into the new phase. It opened one month ahead of schedule in September 2003. Today, the first four phases are referred to as the "West Building", and Phase V is referred to as the "North/South Building", as it is divided into North and South Exhibition Halls which can be joined to form one large exhibition space or subdivided into six different halls (North A1, North A2, North B, South A1, South A2, South B). The North/South Building has 950,282 sq ft (88,284.1 m^{2}) of exhibition space. Around the same time, the Oversight Pedestrian Bridge was built over International Drive connecting the two buildings.

In 2004, OCCC acted as a staging area for relief operations following Hurricane Charley, Frances and Jeanne. Disruptions to convention operations were minimal, and a feared reduction of convention booking did not occur afterward.

In 2009, the Hilton Orlando, a 1400-room luxury hotel, opened. It adjoins with the South Concourse of the Orange County Convention Center's North/South Building via an elevated, covered pedestrian walkway. The Hyatt Regency, a 1641-room hotel, also connects directly to the Convention Center via the Oversight Pedestrian Bridge and the Hyatt Skywalk. The elevated walkway connects the North, South and West concourses over International Drive and the Hilton Orlando. Rosen Plaza and Rosen Centre, offering 800 and 1,334 guest rooms respectively, straddle the West Concourse. They are linked by elevated, covered pedestrian bridges as part of Orange County's master plan to improve connectivity and safety for convention-goers.

In spring 2019 plans were submitted for a 340,000-square-foot expansion of the North/South Concourse. In spring 2020, the COVID-19 pandemic occurred and the expansion was cancelled citing shortfalls in tax collections necessary to fund the expansion. Following the pandemic, expansion plans were resurrected and revised to include a 100,000 sq ft (9,300 m^{2}) ballroom and 44,000 sq ft (4,100 m^{2}) of meeting space to bridge the North and South lobbies. Construction began in late 2025 and is expected to finish 2029. Plans for a second expansion including 200,000 sq ft (19,000 m^{2}) of exhibit hall space to the otherside of the building were also proposed. Preexisting office structures in the West Exhibit Hall dating to the complex being named the OCCCC were removed in 2025 and expanding Hall E by about 6,000 sq ft (560 m^{2}).

== Facility overview ==
The OCCC consists of two buildings joined together by a covered pedestrian bridge. The West Building, opening in four phases from February 27, 1983 (with an initial 150,000 sq ft (14,000 m^{2}) of exhibition space) and 1996, is located on the south side of International Drive. The North/South Building, located on the north side of International Drive, was completed in 2003.

In its entirety, the OCCC includes:

- 2,100,000 square feet (200,000 m^{2}) of exhibition space, including two 92,000-square-foot (8,500 m^{2}) general assembly areas
- 74 meeting rooms/235 breakouts
- The 2,643-seat Chapin Theater
- A 200-seat Lecture Hall
- The 48,600-square-foot (4,520 m^{2}) Tangerine Ballroom
- The 62,000-square-foot (5,800 m^{2}) multipurpose Valencia Room
- Three full-service restaurants/8 food courts
- Three business centers
- In-house electric, plumbing, rigging and technical services, plus wireless mobility throughout the complex
- On-site parking for 6,227
- Three covered loading docks/173 truck bays

=== Orange County Convention Center District ===
The OCCC is connected by skybridges to four nearby hotels which themselves contain large convention areas hosting their own events year round. Together they add another 784 thousand square footage of event space to the area.

| Building | Address | Connected building | Convention Center Size |
|---|---|---|---|
| OCCC West | 9800 International Drive | NA | 4,000,000-square-foot (370,000 m^{2}) |
| OCCC North/South | 9899 International Drive/9400 Universal Boulevard | NA | 3,000,000-square-foot (280,000 m^{2}) |
| Hilton Orlando | 6001 Destination Parkway | North/South | 249,000-square-foot (23,100 m^{2}) |
| Hyatt Regency | 9801 International Drive | West, North/South | 315,000-square-foot (29,300 m^{2}) |
| Rosen Centre | 9840 International Drive | West | 160,000-square-foot (15,000 m^{2}) |
| Rosen Plaza | 9700 International Drive | West | 60,000-square-foot (5,600 m^{2}) |

== See also ==
- List of convention centers in the United States
