= Chitty Chitty Bang Bang (car) =

Vintage racing car and movie prop car

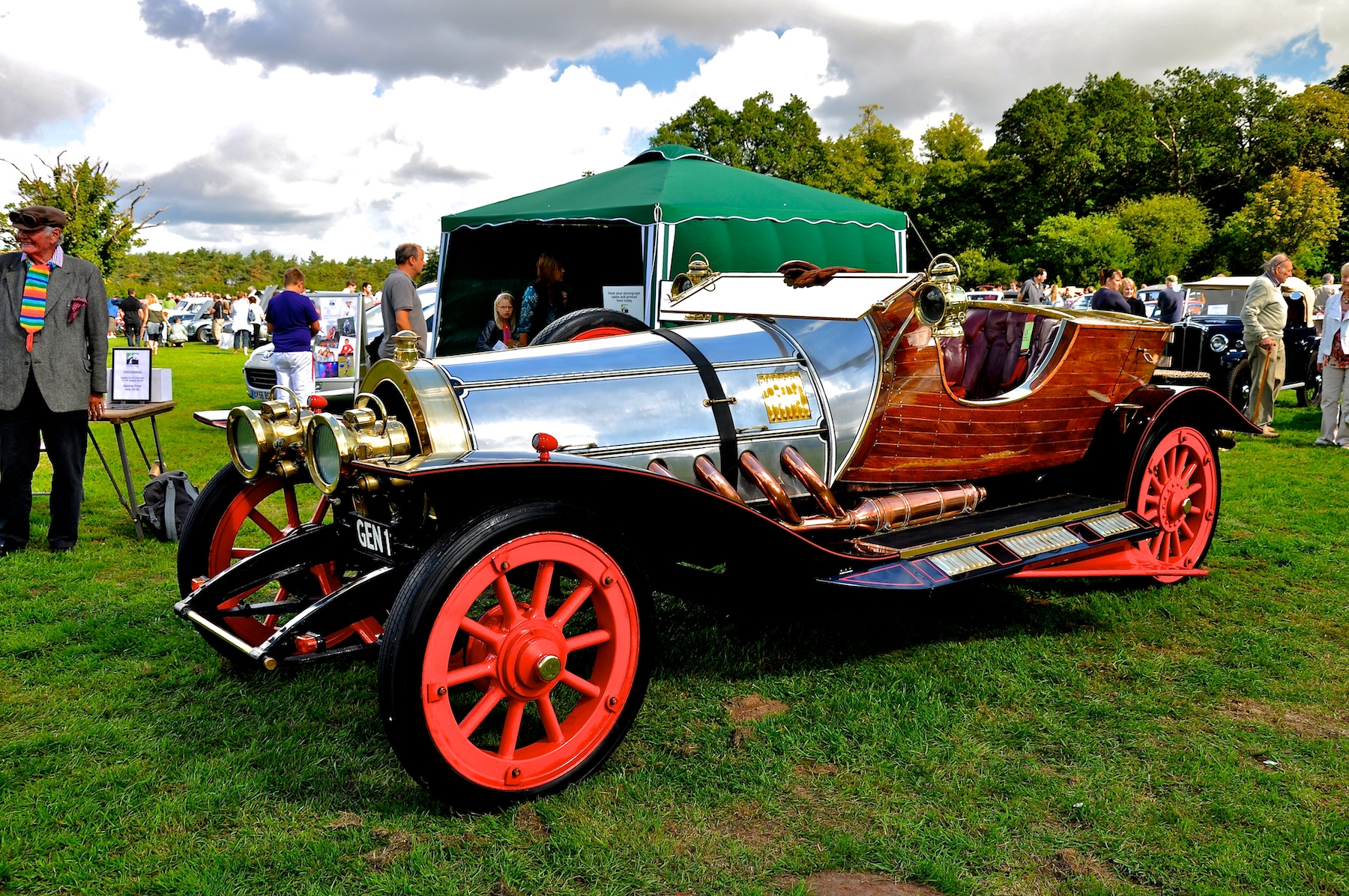
- The car with UK registration GEN 11, which was the primary model used for the most of driving sequences of the 1968 musical film, photographed in September 2010.

Overview
- Manufacturer: Alan Mann Racing
- Also called: Paragon Panther
- Production: 1967
- Designer: Ken Adam, Frederick Rowland Emett

Body and chassis
- Class: custom film model
- Layout: FR

Powertrain
- Engine: 2,994 cm^{3} (182.7 cu in) Ford Essex V6
- Transmission: automatic

Chitty Chitty Bang Bang is the vintage racing car which is featured in the book, musical film and stage production of the same name. Writer Ian Fleming took his inspiration for the car from a series of aero-engined racing cars built by Count Louis Zborowski in the early 1920s, christened Chitty Bang Bang. The original Chitty Bang Bang's engine was from a Zeppelin dirigible. The name reputedly derived either from the sound it made whilst idling, or from a bawdy song from World War I.

Six versions of the car were built for the film and several replicas have subsequently been produced. The version built for the stage production holds the record for the most expensive stage prop ever used.

== Novel and inspiration ==
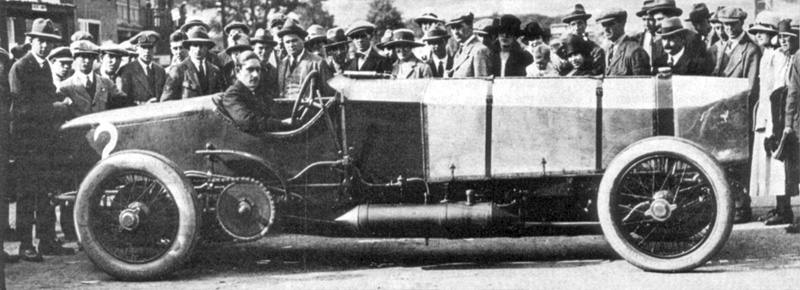
Count Zborowski with Chitty Bang Bang 1 at Brooklands

According to Fleming, the original Chitty Bang-Bang was built in 1920; it used a pre-War Mercedes chassis with a six-cylinder Maybach military aeronautical engine that was typically fitted to Zeppelins. The engine had four overhead valves per cylinder and twin Zenith carburetors; the car was more than 5 short tons (4.5 t) with a bonnet 8 ft (2.4 m) long, finished in grey.

In the novel, the car is described as "a twelve-cylinder, eight-litre supercharged Paragon Panther. They only made one of them and then the firm went broke." At the time the Pott family purchased it, the car was a long, low four-seater in wrecked condition, lacking a bonnet and with British racing green paint peeling off in strips. After purchasing the derelict racer, the children excitedly note the old registration tag, "GEN 11", could be construed as "genii", referring to the powerful magical servants. Caractacus Pott restored the car over a period of three months, and noted "certain modifications, certain changes, had, so to speak, taken place all by themselves during the night, when I wasn't there. Certain – what shall I say? – rather revolutionary and extraordinary adaptations" which turn out to allow her to fly (as a flying car) when stuck in traffic, and allow her to float (as a hovercraft) when the family is stranded on a sandbar by the rising tide.

== Film cars ==
Chitty Chitty Bang Bang dashboards

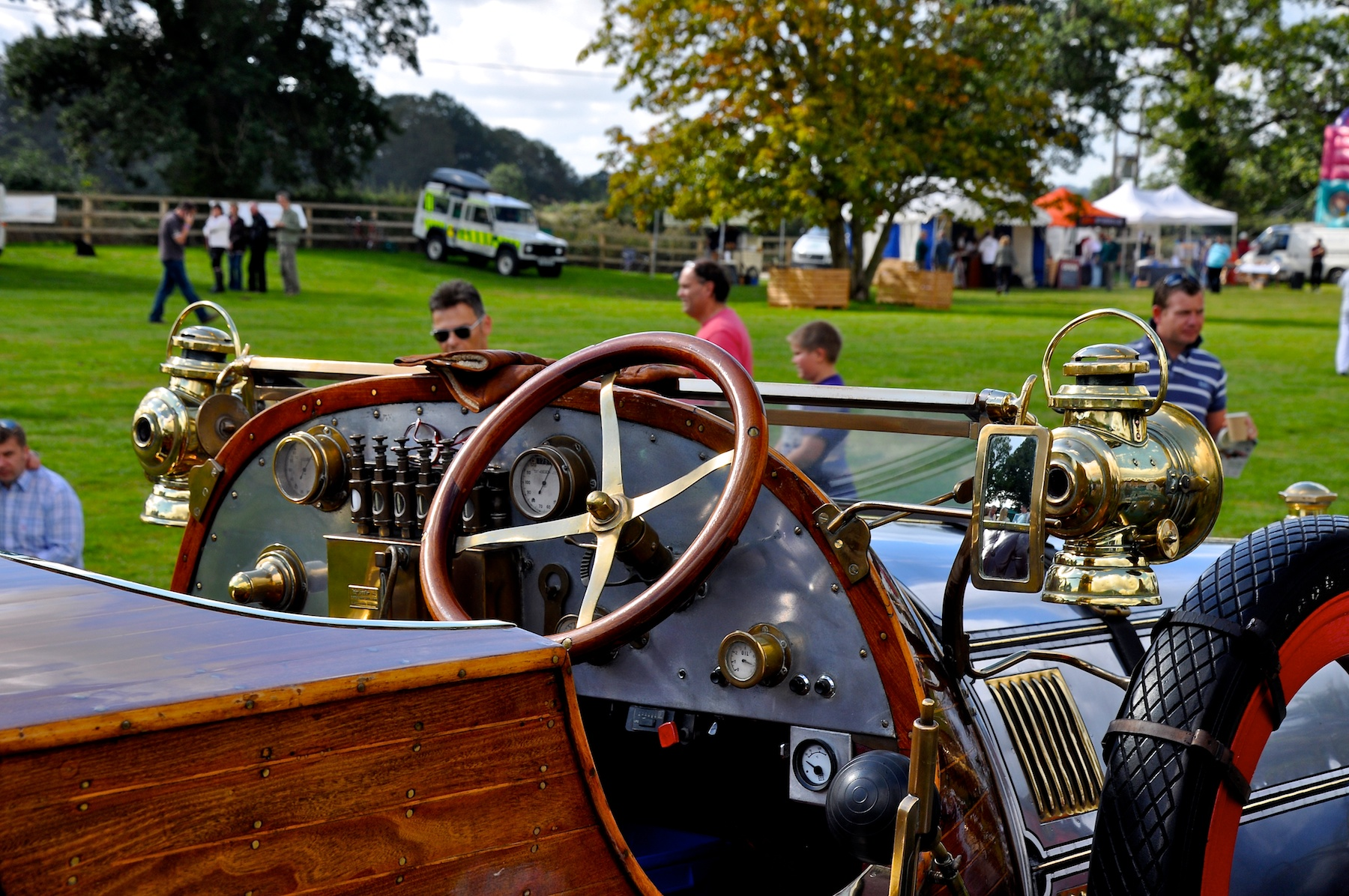
(#1) Chitty prime

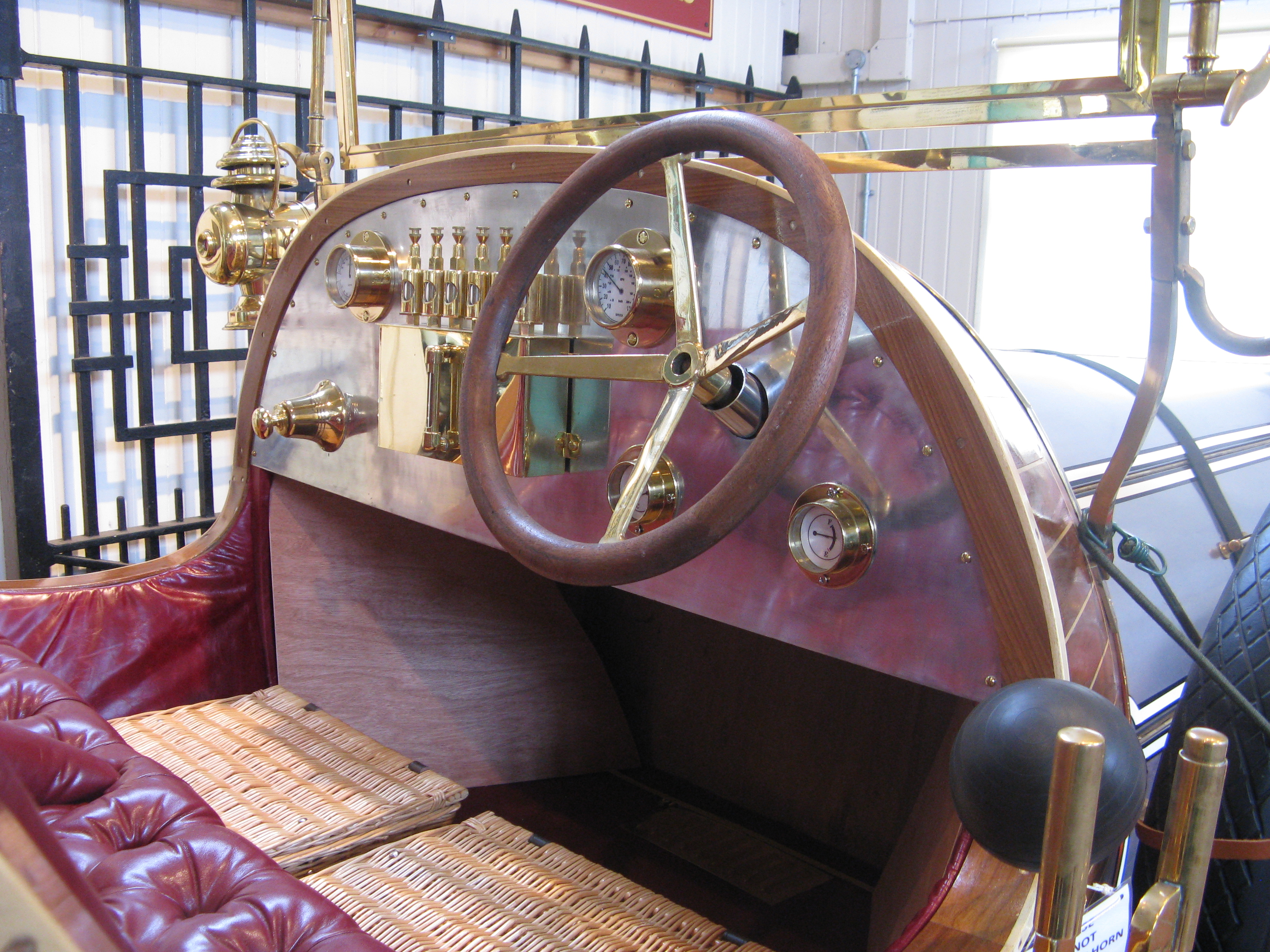
(#7) Chitty ex-racer 3 restomod

For the 1968 film, at least eight cars were created, with two built as the Paragon Panther prior to its crash:

Chitty Chitty Bang Bang film cars
No.	Description	Owner	Publicly viewable
1	Fully-functional road-going car with registration GEN 11 (UK) / GEN 1i (NZ)	Sir Peter Jackson	occasional charity events in New Zealand
2	A supposedly “Slightly smaller” road-going car (though this is unconfirmed that this car was built narrower)	Michael Dezer	museum in New Baltimore, Michigan
3	Originally engineless, for trailer work and close-ups; UK registration GEM 11	Anthony Bamford	occasionally at National Motor Museum, Beaulieu, England
4	Flying model, typically shown on film advertisements & posters	Ralph Spencer	occasional promotional events in Florida
5	Transforming model with aluminium trim	Eon Productions	Long-term loan to Beaulieu
6	Hovercraft / boat	N/A	scrapped after filming
7	Replica rebuilt from car filmed as Paragon Panther, two-seat race car no. 3	Gordon Grant	long-term loan to museums
8	Paragon Panther, two-seat race car no. 3	Michael Dezer	Hollywood Cars Museum, Las Vegas

Only the main road-going version used the registration GEN 11 legitimately until this car was sold in 2011 and it was owned by Pierre Picton of Stratford upon Avon. The other film cars were fitted with engines after filming was complete (except the other road-going car) and were used to promote the film throughout the world. The original racing variant with the British racing green livery and prominent Number 3 shown winning and crashing during the opening credits montage was converted some time after 2010 into a Chitty replica by Gordon Grant.

One of the original cars appeared in a humorous Public information film (PIF) by the Driver and Vehicle Licensing Agency aimed at British motorists, reminding them to pay their Vehicle excise duty. Ironically, there was criticism as all cars built before 1 January 1973 (older than 40 years since 2014), including the Chitty Chitty Bang Bang model, are exempt from vehicle excise duty in the UK. The PIF was a parody of the MGM film.

=== Chitty Prime (GEN 11) ===
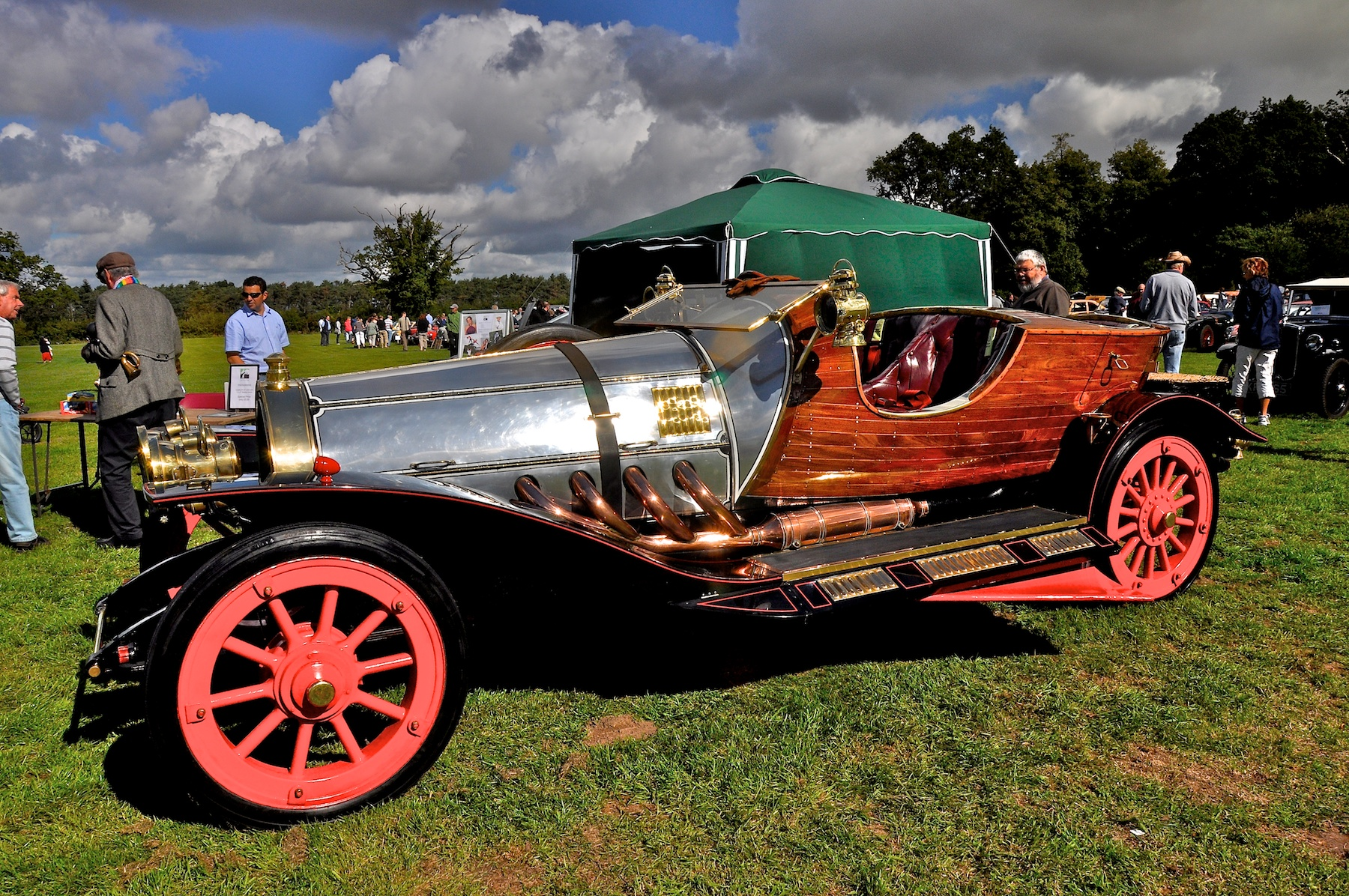
Chitty Chitty Bang Bang (reg GEN 11) at Classic & Sports Cars By the Lake (Sep 2010)

The primary "Chitty" used to photograph most of the driving sequences in the film is a fully functional road-going car with New Zealand registration GEN 1I (formerly UK registration GEN 11). This car was designed by the film's production designer, Ken Adam, and cartoonist and sculptor Frederick Rowland Emett, built by Alan Mann Racing in Hertfordshire in 1967, fitted with a contemporary Ford 3000 Essex V6 engine and automatic transmission and allocated a genuine UK registration. The wooden body was manufactured by ship builders. They employed Architectural Metal Workers, Leonard and Eric Harrington of Ware to manufacture the external metal components. Actor Dick van Dyke, who drove the car in the film, said that "the car was a little difficult to maneuver, with the turning radius of a battleship". Chitty prime is approximately 17 1/2 ft (5.3 m) long and weighs 2 short tons (1.8 t). Externally, the main road-going Chitty prime can be distinguished from the other filming models by the presence of small position lights atop the front mud guards to meet motor vehicle standards.

This car was privately owned by Pierre Picton of Stratford-upon-Avon from the early 1970s until May 2011. He made numerous public appearances with the car up until the end of 2010, including stops in Malta (1990) and the city of Norwich in August 2009, to promote the theatre show. It was also used as a wedding car in Pierre’s home town of Shottery, Stratford upon Avon in August 1990 attracting much attention from tourists as it played its theme tune on its way through town with bride and groom on board. In 2002, it was used in an advert for the DVLA warning about road tax evasion. Public appearances of the car in 2010 were listed on the GEN 11 official website, with a note that there will be no more as the car was sent to Los Angeles to be auctioned on 22 May 2011. The auction price was expected to reach US$1–2 million, but capped at $805,000 (£495,415) with the winning bid submitted by New Zealand film director Sir Peter Jackson, who according to his spokesperson said he would use it as a charity fund-raising vehicle. It was registered in New Zealand as GEN 1I, as the registration GEN 11 had already been issued.

=== Chitty Beta ===
The second road version, a “slightly smaller car” (supposedly this car was built “slightly narrower” than the other Chitty’s made for the film though this is only rumoured and is unconfirmed by both Pinewood Studios and Alan Mann Racing who made the cars for the film), only appears in the film for around 3 minutes, however viewers have noticed that the wood used for the steering wheel was a darker wood and the wheel also sat higher on the dashboard, has appeared in a quite a few scenes throughout the film, thus speculating that this car was regularly used as a drivable stand in to the Chitty Prime.

Chitty Beta can be seen in these notable scenes below:

- when Chitty is driving past the train during the song Chitty Chitty Bang Bang (Reprise)
- the last scenes in the song Chitty Chitty Bang Bang (Reprise) - the scenes with the car going up the hill then going down the hill with the ocean in the background
- when Chitty is driving round the winding roads after the beach
- when Chitty is driving up the hill from the beach
- when Lord Scrumptious is driving behind and trying to get past Chitty, just before the railway bridge - this was actually the first scene shot for the film
- the scene just after the zeppelin flew over
- the scene just before the cast and car drove over the cliff at Beachy Head
- the car being driven and sat under the viaduct after Chitty has landed in “Vulgaria”
- the car that was in the village/town of “Vulgaria” & being towed up to the castle
- the car inside the Baron’s castle - this Chitty was fitted with secondary controls in the footwell of the car to make it look like the car was driving herself
- the scene where the car descended the staircase on the outside of the Castle before the flying Chitty was used for the following scene

There are several noted external differences that distinguish the Beta car from the Prime car:

- the support bars behind the radiator grille are vertical & not horizontal like the other Chitty’s
- the wood of the steering wheel is darker (as mentioned above)
- the steering wheel also sits higher on the dashboard (again as mentioned above is also similar to the other Chitty cars except the Prime which has a lower sitting steering wheel)
- the metal dashboard has a brushed, matte finish rather than a shiny, polished finish

This car may have been the first car made for the production of the film and if it was, the car would have most likely used for additional scenes during early production and others throughout the film. The car was used heavily for preproduction publicity shots.

This car was used to promote the American release of the film when filming ended. Eventually it was purchased by and displayed at the Cars of the Stars Motor Museum in 2000, where it remained until the Keswick museum closed in 2011. The Cars of the Stars collection was purchased by collector Michael Dezer, where it was displayed in Miami as part of his eponymous collection. Dezer's collection has since moved to Orlando.

This car is now on display at the Stahls Automotive Foundation in New Baltimore, Michigan.

=== Trailer Chitty (GEM 11) ===
This engineless Chitty was built for close-ups of the actors while driving; the body was mounted to a trailer and scenes were filmed from cameras on the tow vehicle. It had wings, though they were slightly different than the flying Chitty, and was used for both aerial shots as well as some aquatic scenes, filmed in the Pinewood Studios pool.

In this car, the steering wheel sits higher on the dashboard. In addition, the front position lights are carried at the bottom front edge of each mud guard.

Pierre Picton purchased the trailer Chitty in the early 1970s and had an engine fitted to it; he also modified the front-left mud guard to fly up for his circus act. Picton sold the car shortly afterwards, and the car was publicly displayed at the Heathfield Wildlife Park and The Rotunda in Folkestone before being sold in 1980/81 to collector Anthony Bamford, who registered it under GEM 11. Bamford has occasionally shown GEM 11 at the National Motor Museum in Beaulieu, UK.

=== Flying Chitty ===
One car was built with wings and fiberglass pieces and filmed for flying scenes. The leading edges of the wings house folding propellers. This car was used for publicity stills to promote the film upon its release in 1968 and features prominently in posters.

In 1973, the flying Chitty was sold at auction for US$37,000 (equivalent to $268,000 in 2025) and subsequently was displayed at the Cavalcade of Cars, an exhibit at the Gaslight Village amusement park in the Village of Lake George, New York, starting in 1975. After the park closed in 1989, it was sold at auction in 1990 to Jim Rich, a Chicago businessman, who displayed it at his restaurant, Chicago West (billed as "Mona Lisa's Hideaway"), until it was sold again at auction in 2007 for US$505,000 (equivalent to $784,000 in 2025) to Ralph Spencer, a Florida resident. The car went through an extensive restoration before being put on temporary display at a Mulch-Production facility in 2018.

=== Transforming Chitty ===
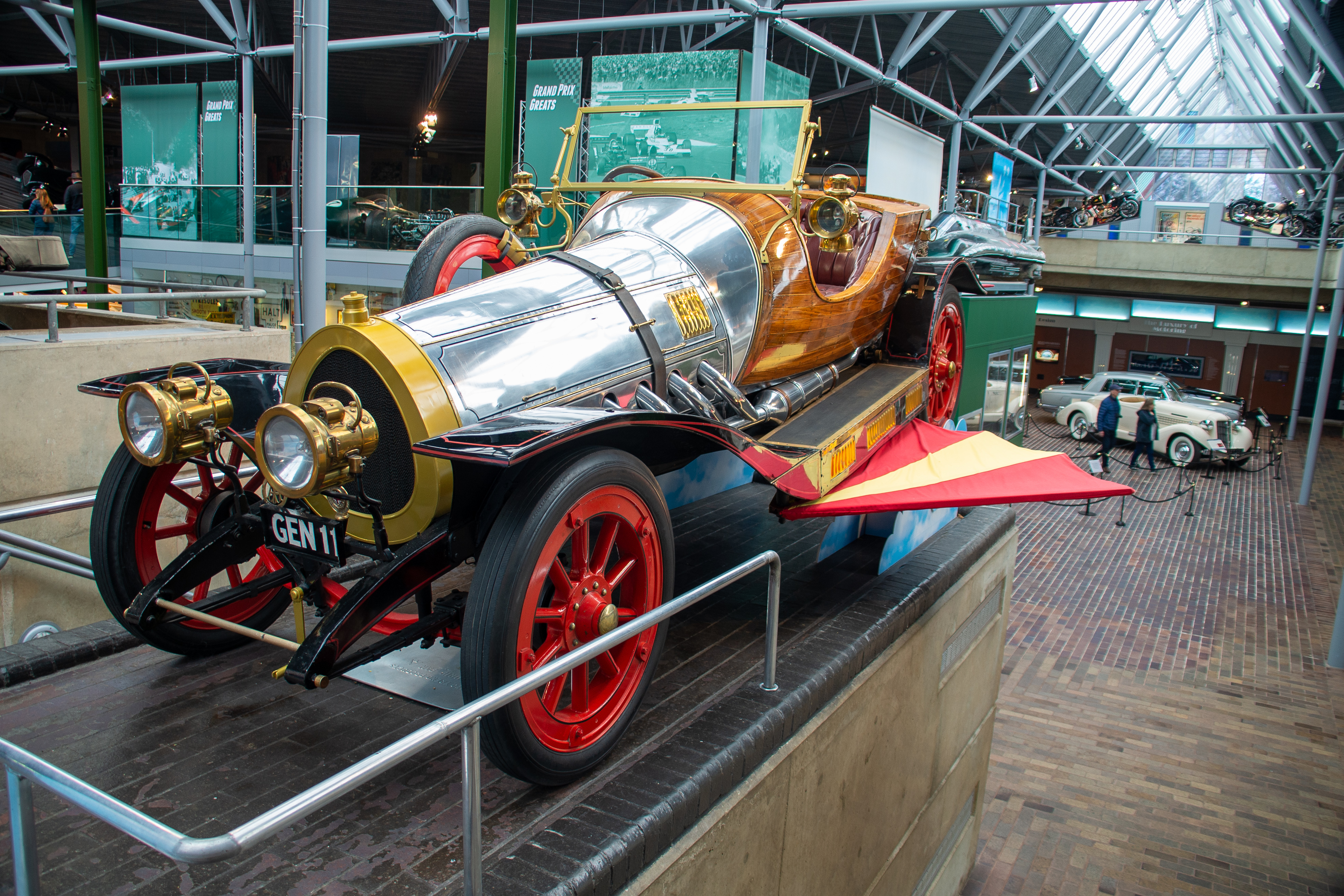
Aluminium filming variant in National Motor Museum, Beaulieu, after recolouring by Eon

A version with primarily aluminium fittings was built for the tidal scenes when Chitty has become stranded before transforming into a boat. It appears on screen for less than a minute, as its appearance was significantly different from the other Chitty’s; the aluminium was substituted as it was thought the sea and salt air would corrode the brass radiator surround of the primary filming cars. The lighter aluminium car also was hoisted for scenes showing the transformation to flying mode.

After filming was complete, this car was used to promote the film in Australia. In 1991, it was purchased by and displayed at the Cars of the Stars Motor Museum in Keswick, then sold to Eon Productions in 2000, who used the aluminium Chitty to promote the stage musical both the 2002 London West End show and 2005 New York Broadway show. Eon tinted some parts to a brass-like colour to more closely resemble Chitty prime, but the transforming aluminium Chitty retained the original aluminium (silver-coloured) shifter, exhaust, and muffler. As it does not have a MOT certificate of roadworthiness in the U.K., it is not allowed on public roads. In July 2009, the Norwich police barred its use in a parade, as the car was not roadworthy, properly registered or insured.

The transforming aluminium Chitty is on long-term loan from Eon to the National Motor Museum, Beaulieu.

=== Hovering (boat) Chitty ===
The hover-car was a shell mounted on a speed boat, and was destroyed after filming. According to Heather Ripley, who played the role of daughter Jemima Potts, the boat was controlled remotely from the helicopter filming the scene; because the steering wheel was only cosmetic, Dick Van Dyke would spin the wheel without affecting their path.

=== ex-Racer No. 3 restomod (11 GEN) ===
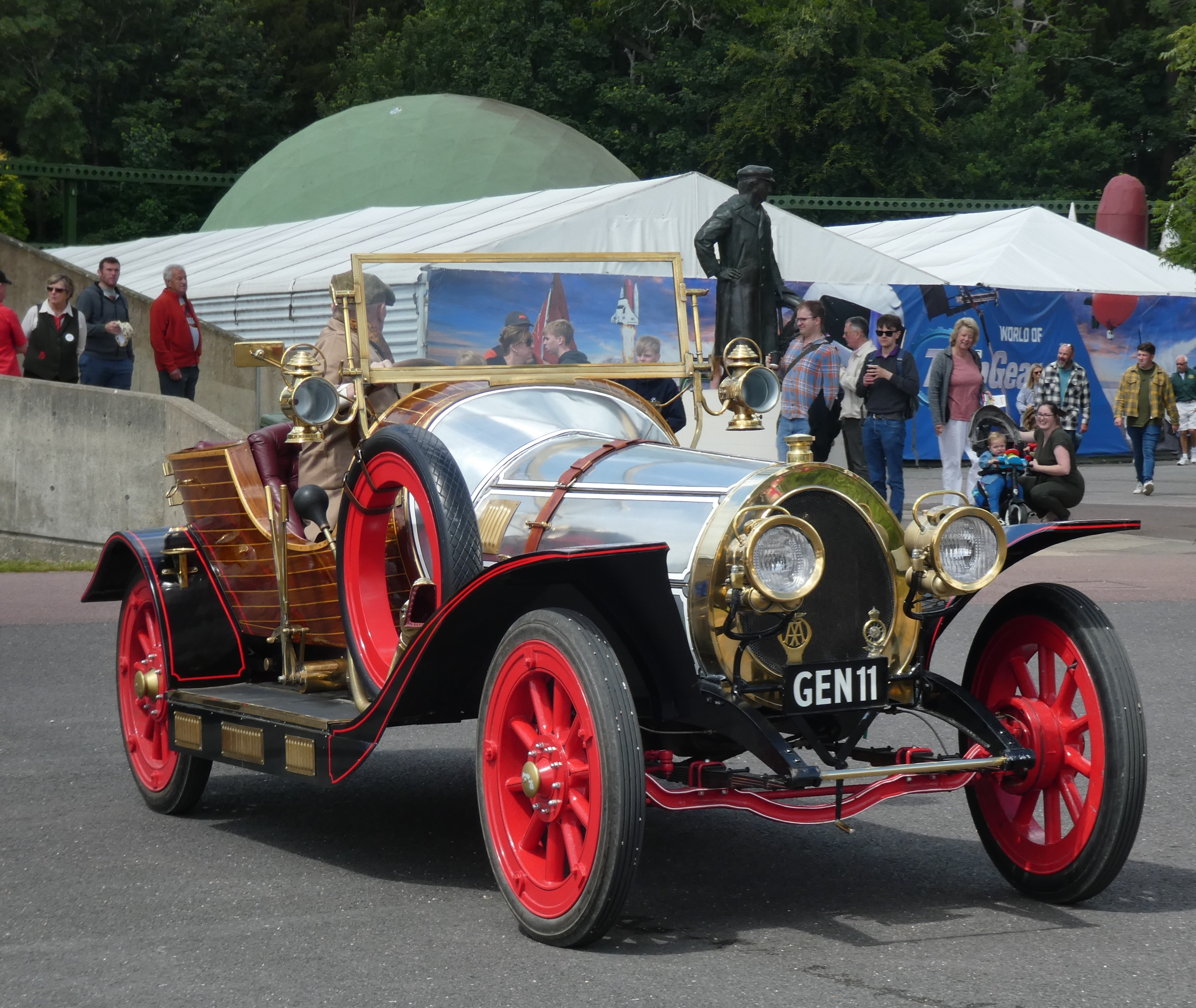
Chitty ex-racer 3 restomod

One of the racing Paragon Panther cars filmed in the opening scenes as Number 3 was acquired by Gordon Grant and reconstructed as a Chitty replica. Grant previously had built a close replica between 1998 and 2008 using the original plans, which was sold at auction in 2011. The fictional registration 11 GEN was applied to the refurbished ex-racer, which was completed in time to be displayed at the Brooklands Museum in 2014. It was also on a long-term loan to the Glasgow Transport Museum until 2017 to raise funds for Strathcarron Hospice.

ex-Racer 3 can be distinguished from Chitty prime by its ten exposed lug nuts attaching each front wheel; the front wheel lug nuts of Chitty prime have a red cover installed after filming.

Grant went on to purchase and restore Mr Toad's car from the 1996 film The Wind in the Willows. Ex-racer no. 3 is now at Beaulieu Motor Museum, where visitors can experience a ride in the car round the estate or watch the car go by.

=== Paragon Panther ===
The Hollywood Cars Museum in Las Vegas has a Paragon Panther race car with a bare-metal finish, as it appears in the opening sequence of race scenes, prior to its crash. It is displayed in partnership with collector Michael Dezer alongside other cars made famous through film appearances and the Liberace Garage, decorated automobiles previously owned by Liberace.

== Replica cars ==
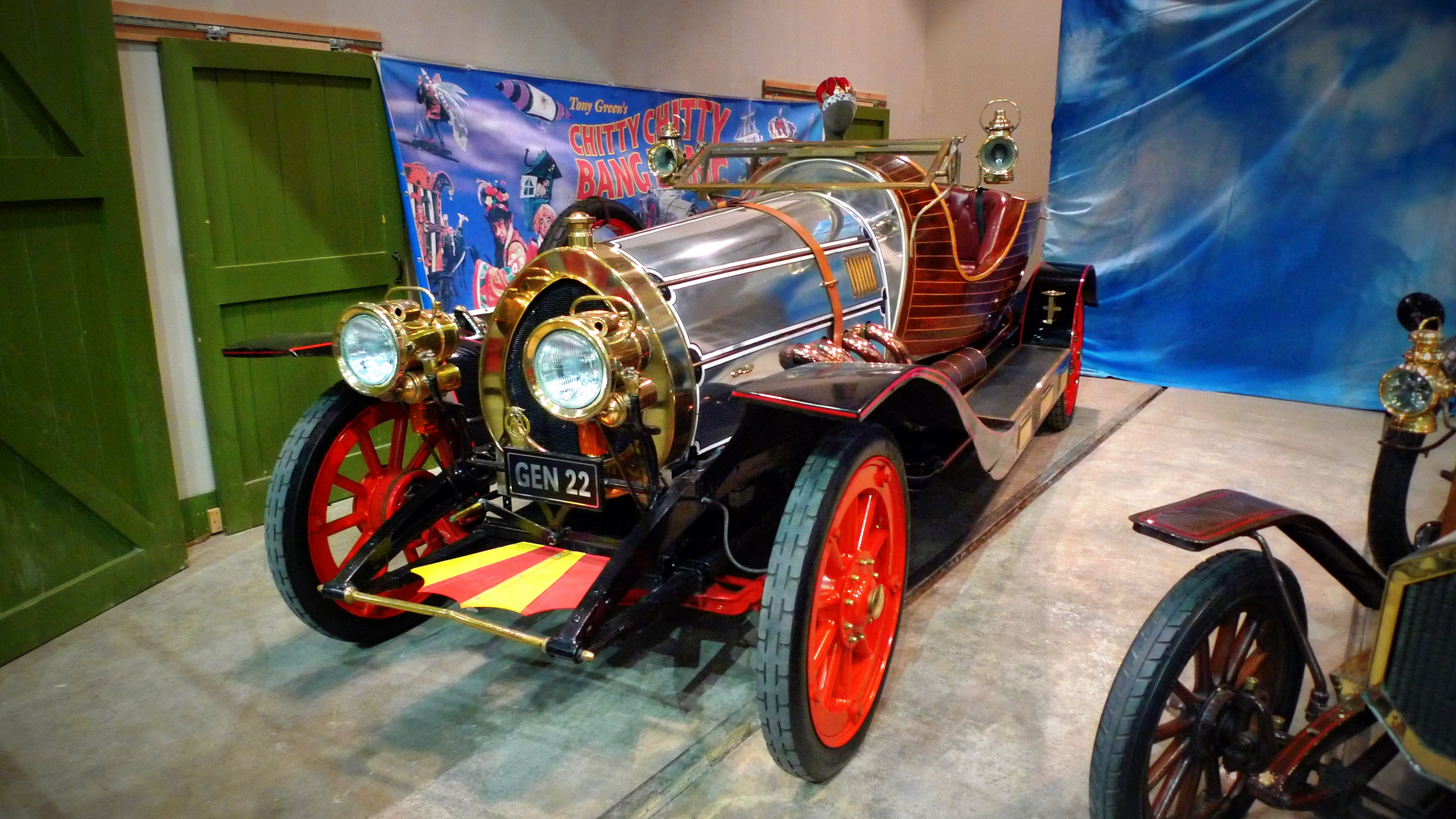
Registration GEN 22: Tony Green's replica car

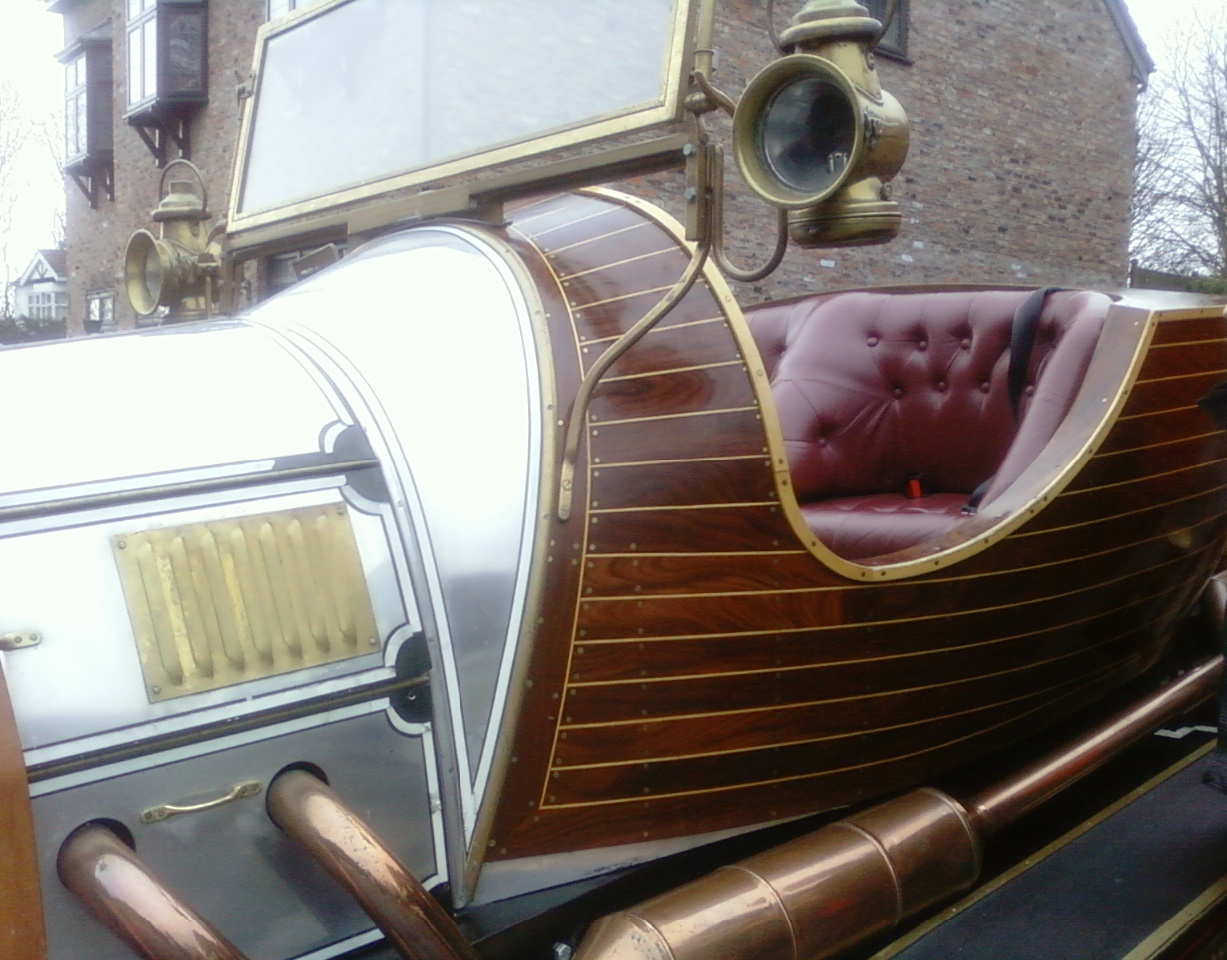
GEN 22: Close up of Tony Green's replica car

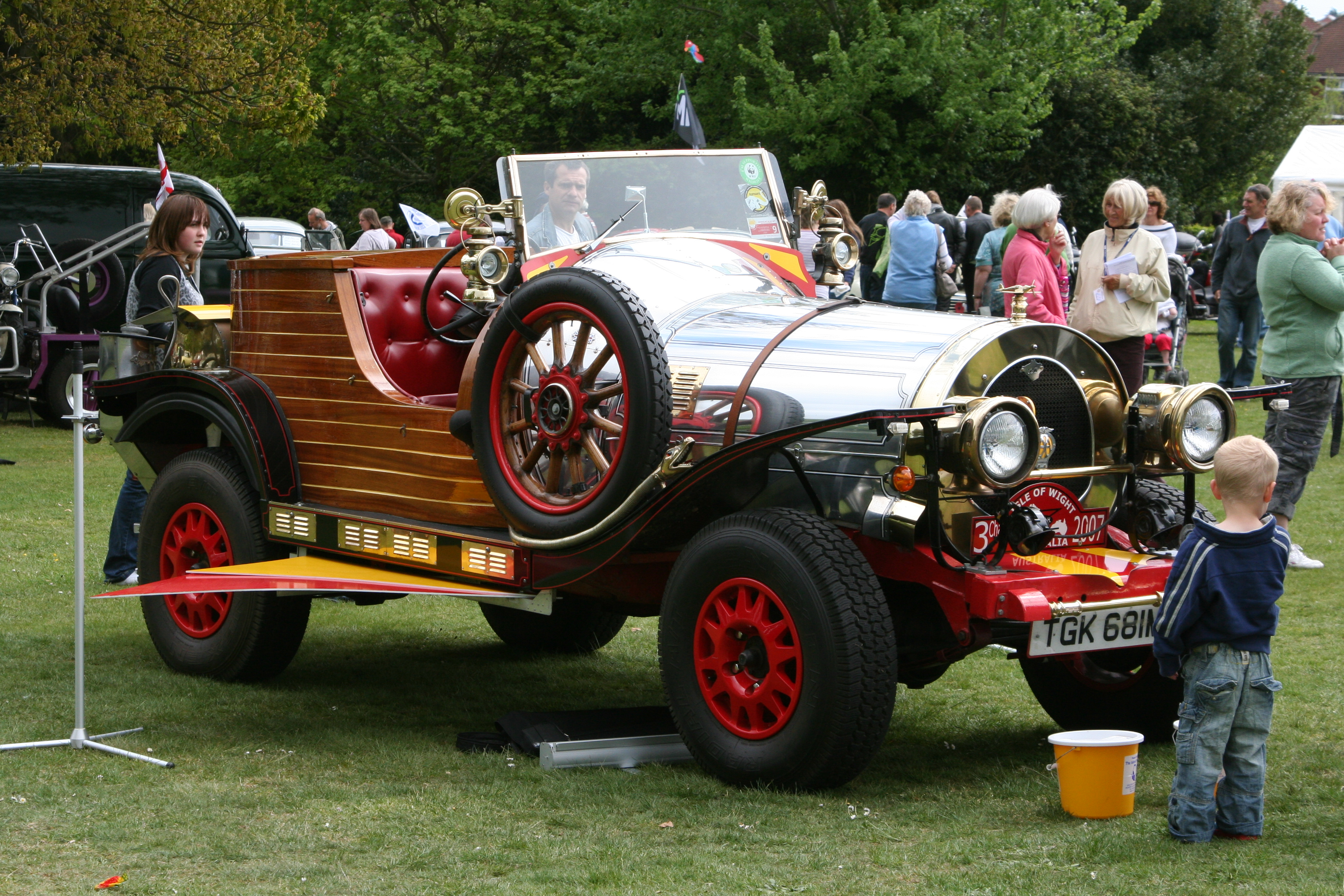
TGK 681M: Carolyn Pointing's "Chitty" at a 2009 event

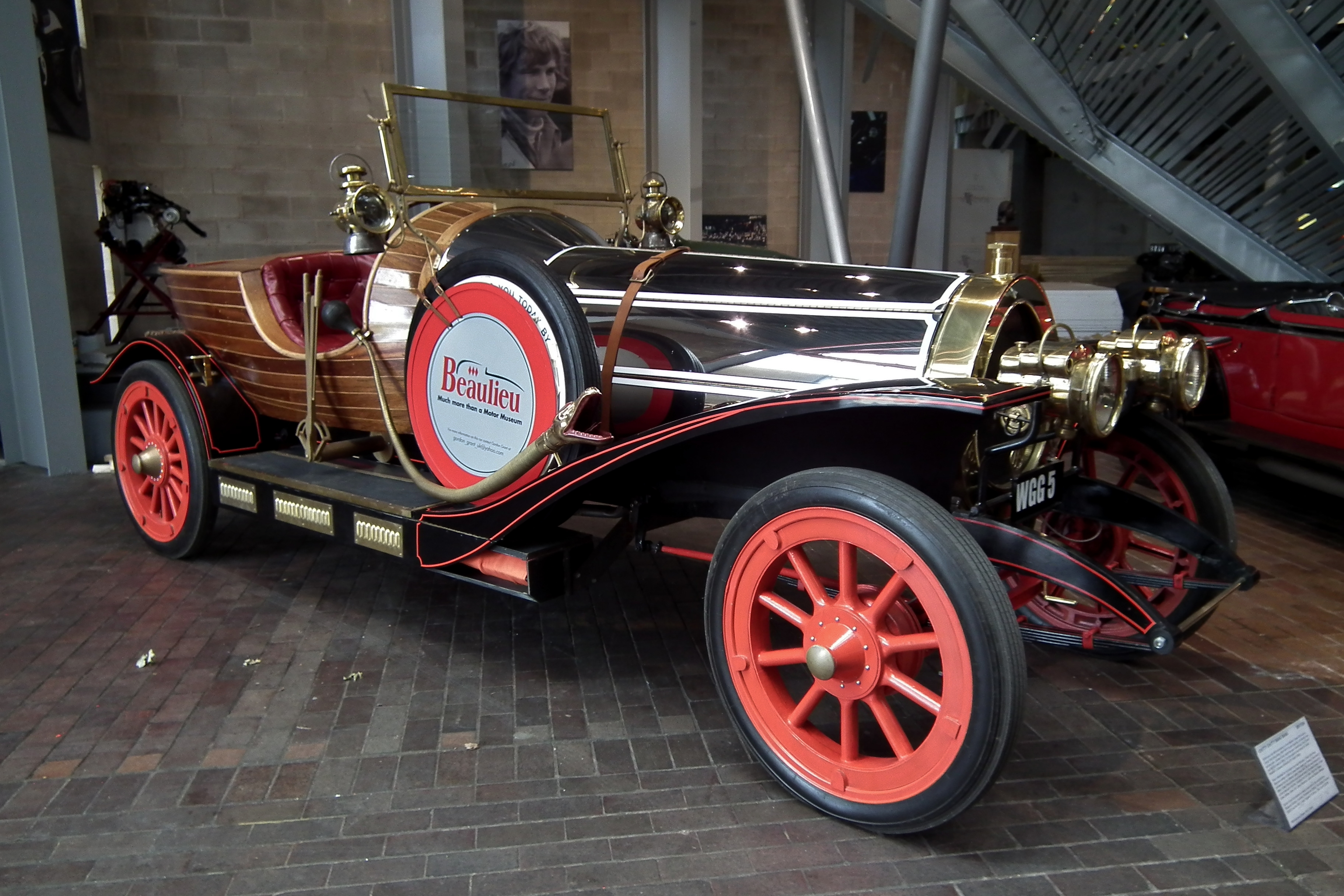
772 YUJ: Gordon Grant's Chitty at Beaulieu

=== Green Chitty (GEN 22) ===
There is an MGM-licensed replica in the United Kingdom, built by Tony Green from the original plans for a commercial photography business over a three-year period, starting in 2000. The car is roadworthy and has the registration number GEN 22. It weighs around 1.5 short tons (1.4 t) and is nearly 18 ft (5.5 m) long and 6 ft (1.8 m) wide. The brass lamps are all original period pieces and the brass snake horn came from one of the original Chitty cars. The engine is a 3L V6 Ford with a BorgWarner automatic gearbox.

The vehicle formerly resided at the Dundee Museum of Transport until January 2025.

=== Pointing Chitty ===
Another Chitty 'copy' was built by Nick Pointing of the Isle of Wight at the request of his wife Carolyn, a lifelong Chitty Chitty Bang Bang fan who asked him to build her dream car. The car was built on a 1970s Land Rover chassis and engine and was driven 12,000 mi (19,000 km) overland to Australia in 2007/8 to raise money for charity.

=== Grant Chitty (772 YUJ) ===
A replica Chitty Chitty Bang Bang car built by Gordon Grant made its debut in 2008 at Pinewood Studios and was sold at an auction held on 1 December 2011 at Bonhams at Mercedes Benz World in Weybridge, Surrey, UK, bearing the registration plate WGG 5. The Grant Chitty was started in 1998 and took ten years to complete, using advice, assistance, and original blueprints provided by Peter Lamont, who was the assistant art director for the 1968 film; Denise Exshaw, retired set decorator and widow of Harry Pottle, the art director for the film; Lionel Whitehead, who was the chief mechanic at Alan Mann Racing; and Terry Dan, who had built the original car's wooden bodywork. The wheels were cast from the original car by the original foundry. It is equipped with a Ford V6 and automatic transmission, matching Chitty prime.

The car was later sold to broadcaster Chris Evans after the purchaser found it was too long to fit in his garage. Evans hired Joe Macari to make it road legal in 2012, and it was sold at auction again in 2015. The car, which is now registered as 772 YUJ, has been reported erroneously in several newspapers as the original Chitty prime film car with registration GEN 11.

=== Rothwell Chitty ===
Another replica was built and finished in July 2014 by hospital worker and jeweller John Rothwell from Cambridge. It is based on a Reliant Rialto chassis and took approximately 3 years to build in a small garage rented from the local council. Having a three-wheeler based chassis makes this car unique and also disqualifies it from being a genuine replica. This version of Chitty was used by a local car insurance company for a promotion campaign and is frequently taken to local car shows where it helps to raise money for Addenbrookes Hospital Charitable Trust.

=== Garofalo Chitty ===
A replica car built by retired NYPD police Sergeant, Tony Garofalo, of Long Island, New York, was completed in June 2015 after a 5-year build at a cost of over US$100,000. The car is modelled on the original motion picture car, after Garofalo conducted a personal inspection of two original Chitty Chitty Bang Bang cars. Built on a vintage, road legal, 1914 Overland car, updated with a 1928 Ford Model A engine, the car has automated opening retractable wings and vintage brass adornments. All of the bright work is brass, aluminium, stainless steel and copper to prevent any corrosion. It is reported that over 90% of the car has been fabricated, although the original vintage chassis, drivetrain and rear axle have been retained, with an additional conversion to 12 volts. The car is finely detailed with all of the brass features of the original movie car, including a vintage serpent snake horn from an old Mercedes. Garofalo also owns the original Broadway Stage Production Chitty Chitty Bang Bang car featured in the U.S. Stage tour.

=== Skinner Chitty ===
Richard Skinner of Hampshire built another replica car, completed in 2019. Following two years of research, the car was built from original drawings of the film car, using the same Ford V6 engine and various original Edwardian car parts. The wooden body was constructed using the same afrormosia and obeche wood used in the original.

=== Mccracken Chitty ===
Keith Mccracken from Northern Ireland, UK, started building his replica in 2010 completing it and making it road legal in 2012. It was a built as close as possible to the original car being 18ft long, engine is a 3L V6 Ford with a BorgWarner automatic gearbox and period pieces sourced where necessary.The car can be hired for use at events.

== Stage production cars ==
=== New Zealand (1986) ===
A prop car was built in Christchurch, New Zealand for the first known stage performance of the musical, which opened at the Isaac Theatre Royal on August 23, 1986. The car was built by local Christchurch men Brian Grace and Bryan Sullivan. Little is known about the building of the car but according to cast member Simon Woodley, it had a working petrol engine and was driven on and off stage. It had retractible wings that were used for the flying scene. The car has been on display for many years at the Yaldhurst Museum of Transport & Science in Christchurch.

=== West End (2002) ===
Another version of the car, built for the British stage production of the story, debuted at The London Palladium in 2002. Built at a cost of £750,000, the car is listed in Guinness World Records as the most expensive stage prop ever. During a 2002 performance before the then HRH Prince Charles and Camilla Parker Bowles, the prop car collided with a ship when the choreography went awry during a chase scene, bringing the show to a premature end; the audience received complimentary tickets to another performance. It was dismantled after the production ended.

=== Broadway & US tour (2005) ===
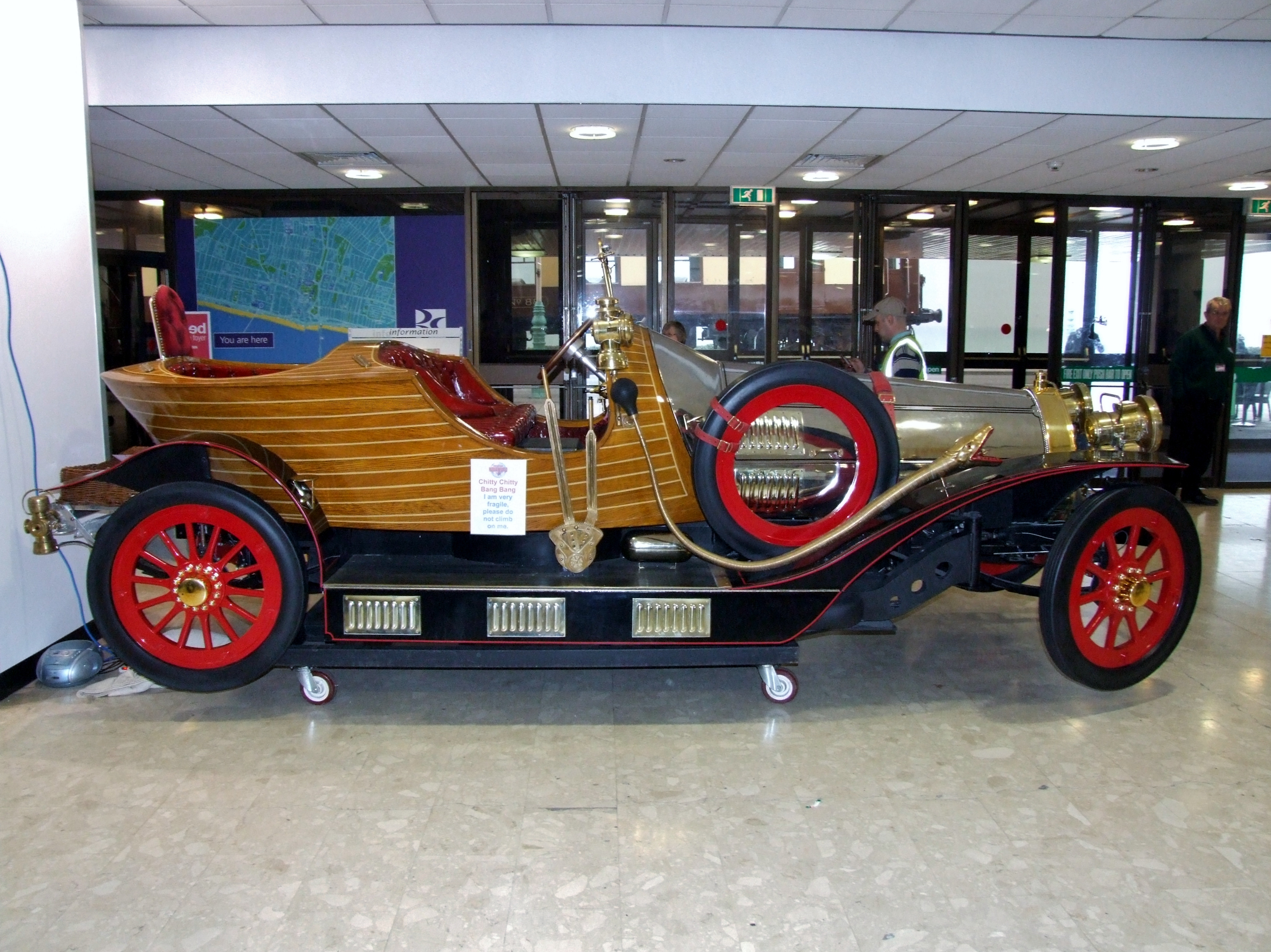
2005 Broadway prop car

This prop car is highly detailed and is fully equipped with multiple Stage prop tricks, including computer activated retractable wings and wheels that can tilt for the hovercraft sequence. The car was originally constructed at The Rolling Stock Company of Sarasota, Florida and hydraulics designed and constructed at PRG of New Windsor, New York, under license by Michael Rose and MGM On Stage. It is approximately 16 ft 5 in (5.00 m) long, 66 in (1,700 mm) wide, and 76 in (1,900 mm) high; each wing adds 98 in (2,500 mm) to the width when deployed.

It is distinguished most easily by the hourglass shape behind the front grille and the non-functional front suspension, as the beam axle is attached directly to the frame and not the leaf springs. In addition, the rear seat does not have side doors for access.

In July 2014, Tony Garofalo, who completed a Chitty replica on June 30, 2015, acquired the US National Broadway Touring Chitty Chitty Bang Bang Prop Car, by a sale release made by Big League Productions of New York City. The Broadway prop was put up for auction in 2022.

=== UK/Ireland tour (2015–17) ===
Another prop car built for the 2015–17 UK/Ireland touring production at a cost of £175,000 was sold at auction in July 2020. Comedian Jason Manford, who had performed as Caractacus during the tour, was outbid by Bowden Theatre Works, who purchased the prop for £19,000. The auction also featured additional props from the production, including a vintage motorcycle, Baron Bomburst's car, and the Child Catcher's cage.

=== Kennedy Center Honors (2022) ===
At Dick Van Dyke's 2021 Kennedy Center Honors performance tribute, the car used for the televised event was designed and built by Duane Joseph Olson and crew. The car was used in a rendition of the title number, performed by Pentatonix and Broadway actor Aaron Tveit. The prop was originally built for a staging of the musical at the CENTER for Performing Arts at Rhinebeck in 2018. It is a 3:4 scale replica of the car from the film, and features the deployable wings, inflating flotation devices, and downward-folding wheels. Unlike most replicas, the entire exterior of the car is made of wood. Upon seeing the car himself, Van Dyke himself was quoted saying, "you guys just blew me away. That Chitty is perfect." The car is still owned and managed by Olson.
