= Cars of the Stars Motor Museum =

Museum of television and film vehicles

Coordinates: 54.601°N 3.136°W

Cars of the Stars Motor Museum Logo

The Cars of the Stars Motor Museum was in the English town of Keswick, Cumbria, and owned a collection of celebrity television and film vehicles. The museum opened in 1989 and closed in 2011. The sister site The Bond Museum in Keswick, with its over 30 original screen cars from the James Bond films, also closed at the same time.

Nearly all of the vehicles were sold to the American collector Michael Dezer. He relocated the collection to America, where he used it to establish a permanent Cars of the Stars exhibition at his Miami Auto Museum.

== History ==
In 1982, the museum's founder, Peter Nelson, was approached for use of his MG TC in "The Spoils of War" television production. As a result, he formulated the idea of starting a motor museum with a focus on television and film-based vehicles. The Royal Oak Garage in central Keswick was purchased and refurbished to house the collection.

The museum opened to the public on 1 May 1989 and closed in May 2011. The museum's collection was relocated to the United States.

== Collection ==
The collection included:

- A Ford Anglia 105E, which had been used during the filming of Harry Potter and the Chamber of Secrets
- Both of the two remaining A-Team GMC vans
- KITT (convertible) from Knight Rider
- Batmobiles from the various Batman related films and television series
- A DeLorean promotional replica from the Back to the Future films
- One of the original Mr. Bean MkIV Austin Minis. (A replica of this is also at the National Motor Museum)
- Laurel and Hardy's Model 'T' Ford
- A comprehensive collection of vehicles from the James Bond films including at least five Aston Martins and a variety of other James Bond cars such as the Lotus Esprit, Toyota 2000GT, AMC Matador, and a BSA motorcycle
- Chitty Chitty Bang Bang from the film of the same name
- The Mad Max film Pursuit Special Ford Falcon XB GT Coupe
- The Munsters' Munster Koach, a hot rod based on a lengthened 1923 Ford Model T chassis with a custom hearse body built by customizer George Barris
- A life-sized replica of FAB1 from the supermarionation television series Thunderbirds
- The Street Hawk Motorcycle
- The yellow Reliant Regal van used in Only Fools and Horses
- A Triumph Roadster 1800 as used in the detective series Bergerac
- A Herbie Volkswagen Beetle as used in the film series of the same name
