= FAB 1 =

Pink Rolls-Royce in "Thunderbirds" TV series

FAB 1 (1960s)
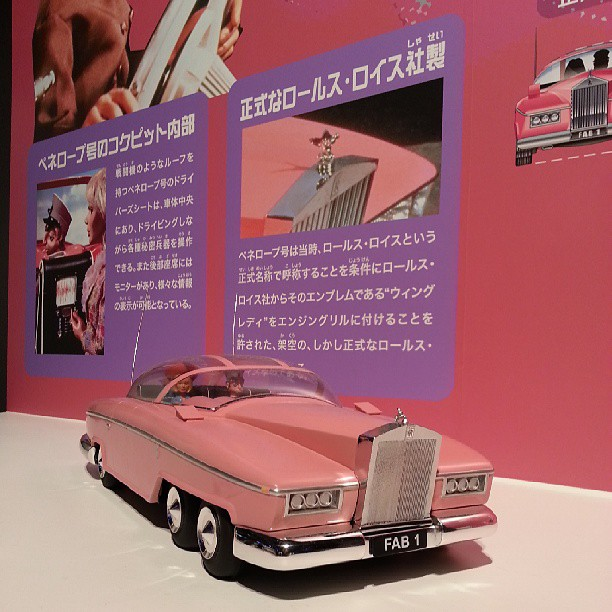
- Scale model at a Tokyo Thunderbirds exhibition
- First appearance: "Trapped in the Sky" (30 September 1965)

General characteristics
- Armaments: Machine guns and laser guns Harpoon launchers Smoke screen canister Oil slick dispenser Tyre slashers
- Defences: Bulletproof construction
- Maximum speed: Over 200 miles per hour (320 km/h); On water: 50 knots (58 mph; 93 km/h)
- Propulsion: Rolls-Royce gas turbine On water: Vortex aquajet
- Power: Conventional fuel sources, boosted by solid oxide fuel cells
- Mass: 3 tons
- Length: 21 feet (6.4 m)
- Width: 8 feet (2.4 m)

FAB 1 is a pink, six-wheeled car seen in the 1960s British science fiction television series Thunderbirds, its three film adaptations and its remake, Thunderbirds Are Go. Owned by International Rescue's London agent Lady Penelope, and driven by her butler Parker, the car is, in its original depiction, a specially modified amphibious Rolls-Royce. It possesses a bulletproof casing and an array of weapons. In later adaptations, its make has varied and it is also capable of flight. At least two human-scale replicas have been built.

== Depiction ==
=== 1960s TV series and films ===
In the original Thunderbirds (1965–66), as well as the feature films Thunderbirds Are Go (1966) and Thunderbird 6 (1968), FAB 1 is depicted as a modified Rolls-Royce. Owned by International Rescue agent Lady Penelope Creighton-Ward, the car is usually driven by her butler, Aloysius Parker. The driver sits in a central position at the front of the passenger compartment, which is covered by a bulletproof bubble canopy.

FAB 1 was modified by Brains, the inventor of the Thunderbirds machines, to include weaponry and gadgetry such as front- and rear-mounted machine guns (although grappling hooks are seen to shoot out of the rear in the episode "The Perils of Penelope"). The car is also equipped with a smoke screen canister and oil slick dispenser, extendable tyre studs (for increased traction), and hydrofoils and skis (for travel on water and snow).

==== Background ====
On the choice of make, series co-creator Gerry Anderson said: "Considering [Penelope's] personality, and the role she played in International Rescue, it could only be a Rolls-Royce." AP Films (APF) approached Rolls-Royce Limited, which consented to the use of its brand. In 2004, Rolls-Royce's head of public relations in the 1960s said that the company "couldn't see any harm in [APF's] request, and as the series was aimed at children we thought it would be good for the cars – give them a modern image and, you never know, inspire a child to own one, one day." In return for its co-operation, the company asked that all on-screen references to the make of the car use the full brand name "Rolls-Royce", rather than the abbreviation "Rolls".

To distinguish the look from that of real-life cars, designer Derek Meddings gave FAB 1 a six-wheel drive. He said that his decision to place two sets of wheels at the front, instead of at the back, was motivated purely by aesthetics: "My excuse [...] was that the engine was so big and powerful it needed them, but it wasn't done for any technical reason." He remembered FAB 1 for its "outrageous styling, which bore no resemblance to any Rolls-Royce ever produced".

Several shooting models were built in various sizes, the smallest being a six-inch-long (15 cm) miniature and the largest a puppet-size version, measuring six or seven feet (1.8 or 2.1 m), to accommodate the 1/3 human-scale marionette characters. The latter – constructed from plywood, aluminium and chrome-plated brass – cost approximately £2,500 to build in 1966 (£64,000 in 2023). It had fully-functional steering and headlamps with a removable canopy, doors and underside to facilitate puppet filming. The headlamps incorporated parts from bicycles. Rolls-Royce approved the design and supplied one of its own radiator grilles (costing £100), complete with a Spirit of Ecstasy figure. This was used for close-ups of the larger model, including shots of the car firing its machine guns and a stock photograph of the bonnet featured in the series' closing titles. As the puppet sized car was the most expensive prop to be built for the series, special security measures were followed whenever it was used on set. It is now owned by filmmaker Peter Jackson.

Noting FAB 1's weaponry and gadgets, Robert Sellers and Marcus Hearn liken the car to the modified Aston Martin DB5 driven by James Bond in the films Goldfinger (1964) and Thunderball (1965).

=== 2004 film ===
FAB 1 (2004)
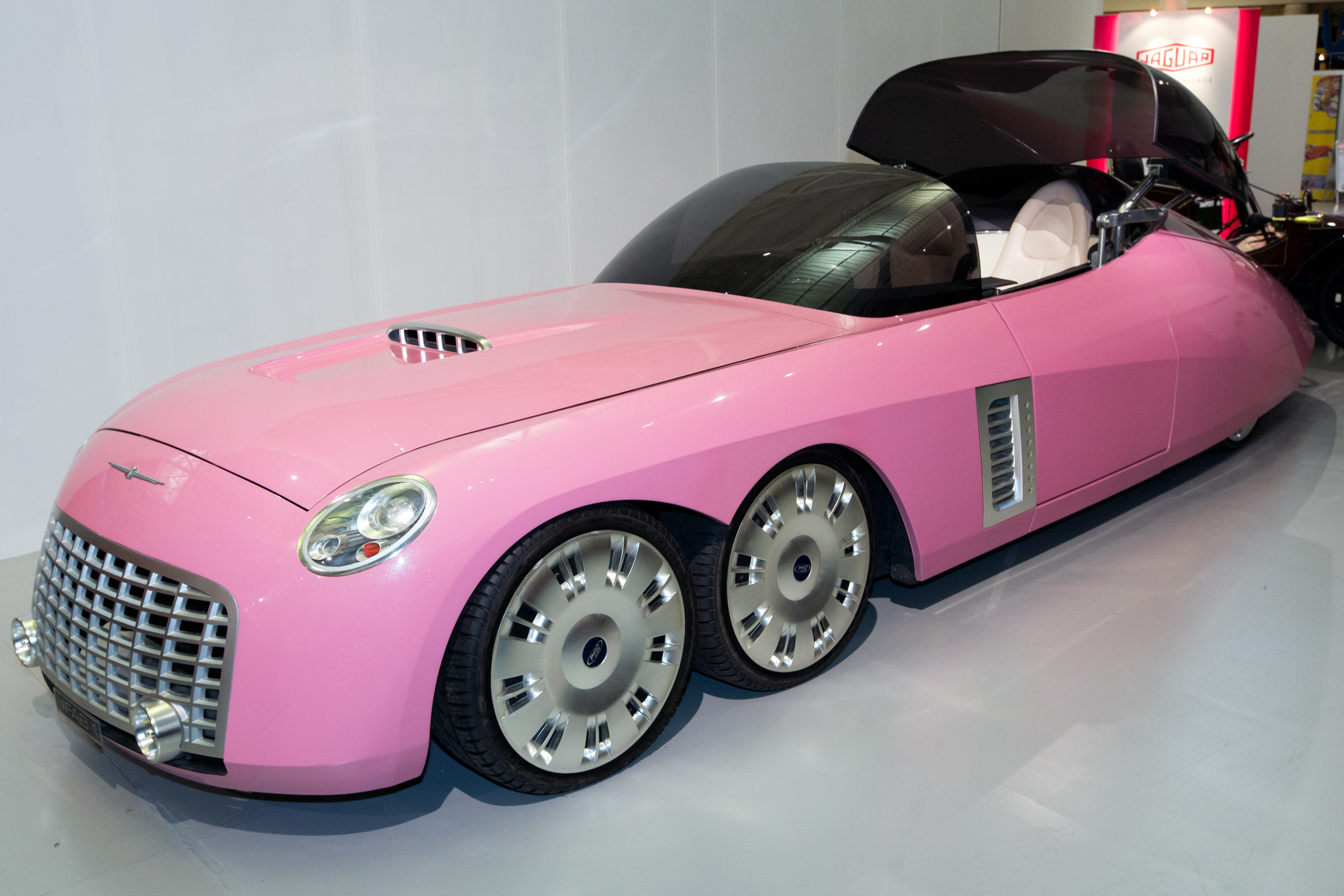
- FAB 1 on display at the Heritage Motor Centre

General characteristics
- Armaments: 3 mini-guns 2 heat-seeking missile launchers 2 torpedo tubes
- Maximum speed: 320 kilometres per hour (200 mph); On water: 180 or 185 km/h (112 or 115 mph; 97 or 100 kn); In air: 9,120 km/h (5,670 mph; 4,920 kn)
- Propulsion: Gas turbine jet engine Mini hover engines
- Power: Miniature nuclear fusion reactor
- Mass: 3.4 tonnes (3.3 long tons; 3.7 short tons)
- Length: 26 feet (7.9 m)
- Width: 6 feet 11 inches (2.1 m); 11 feet (3.5 m) with hydrofoils deployed 15 feet (4.7 m) with wings deployed
- Height: 5 feet 6 inches (1.68 m)

In the 2004 live-action film, Thunderbirds, FAB 1 is still pink and powered by a six-wheel drive. Its glass canopy is tinted, and it is now capable of flight as well as travel on land and sea. Prior to flight, the car's boot panels open, exposing the gas turbine engine; the wings then extend from the undercarriage. During flight, the rear set of wheels folds into the main vehicle body to prevent unnecessary drag. The passenger compartment doubles as a life raft in the event of an emergency at sea, while buoyancy tanks hidden in the body panelling ensure that the compartment remains afloat after it has broken away from the rest of the vehicle.

==== Background ====
Rolls-Royce Motor Cars and its owner BMW declined to be involved in FAB 1's re-design. This led production company Working Title to approach Ford, who accepted the commission and adapted the car from its eleventh-generation Thunderbird. According to Working Title's head of marketing, Rolls-Royce had pushed for the vehicle to be "one of their standard cars – and that would have been too sedate. If you're transferring something like this to the big screen, you have to make it bigger and better." He also called FAB 1 a "crazy missed marketing opportunity" for Rolls-Royce given the car's prominence in the film.

Ford's designers said that due to the car's versatility, "there was a level of restriction that we had to encompass [...] Then we had to identify the link with the Thunderbirds theme and, from our perspective, identify a T-bird essence that wasn't a deliberate rip-off." The finished car was fully functional and roadworthy, and appeared in a segment of the motoring TV series Top Gear, during which it was road-tested by presenter James May. May noted that it was not the most practical of cars, its excessive length making it difficult to drive through small English villages. Testing the car for The Daily Telegraph, Ian Adcock compared the driver's section to a "command module", noting its armrest controls and "fighter aircraft-style joystick" in place of a conventional steering wheel. He also observed that the car "understeers like a yacht, so you constantly have to feed more and more lock on as you power through corners."

Motor Trend magazine called the new FAB 1 "one of the stars of the movie" and "exquisitely executed", while Starburst described it as a "futuristic sports car which recaptures as much of the original's feel as possible." The car was negatively received by XPosé and SFX magazines; XPosé commented that FAB 1 "still look[ed] rubbish" while SFX described it as "rather ugly" and suggested that fans of the original Thunderbirds would not regard it as canon.

Gerry Anderson strongly disliked the design. In an interview with The Independent, he said that it caused him to lose all interest in serving as a creative consultant on the film: "[Working Title] emailed me the picture of the new 'Rolls-Royce'. I took one look and thought, if that's the kind of movie they're making, I'm out.

Following its appearance in the film, the car was put on display at the Heritage Motor Centre in Gaydon, Warwickshire.

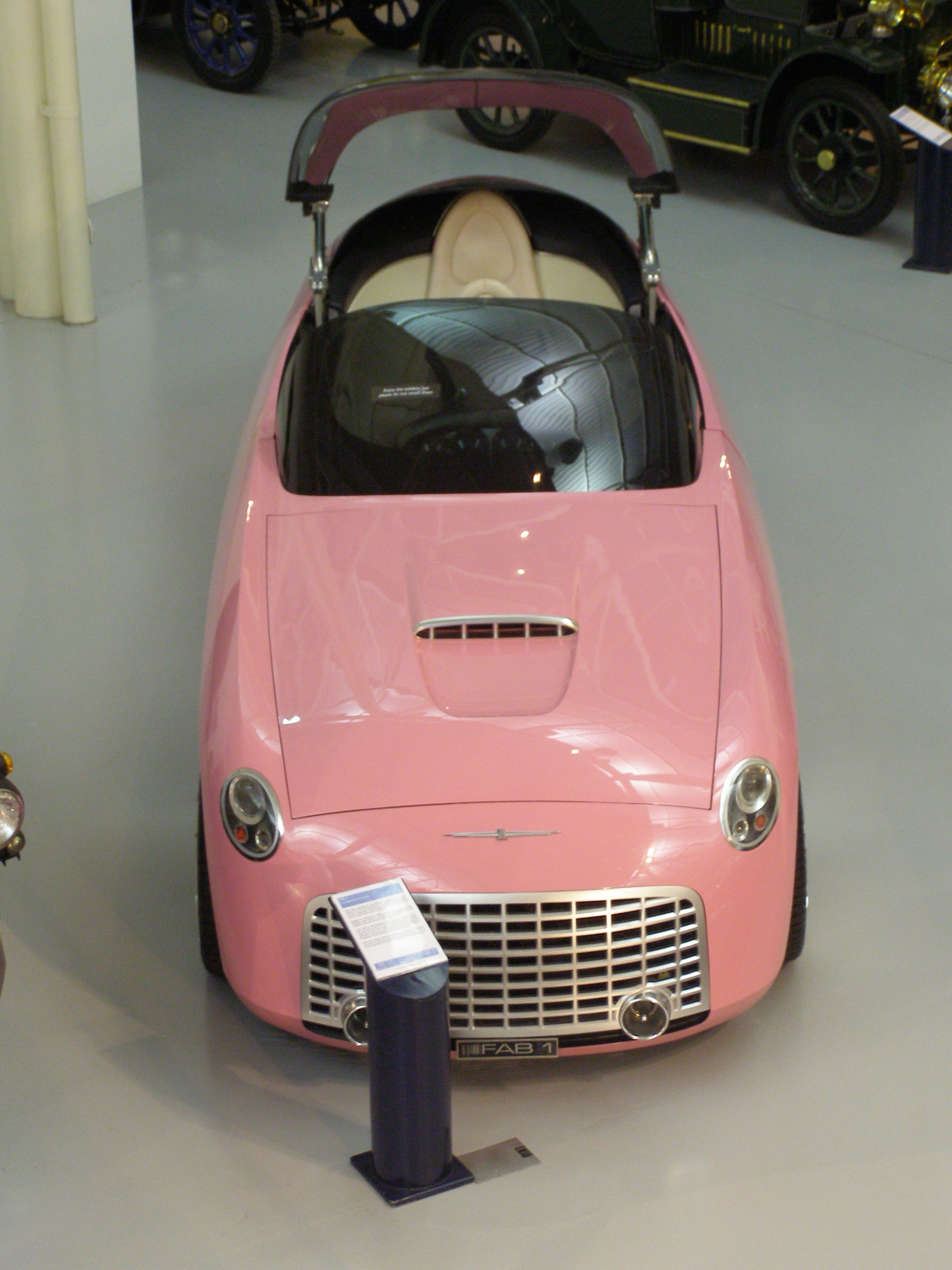
Top view

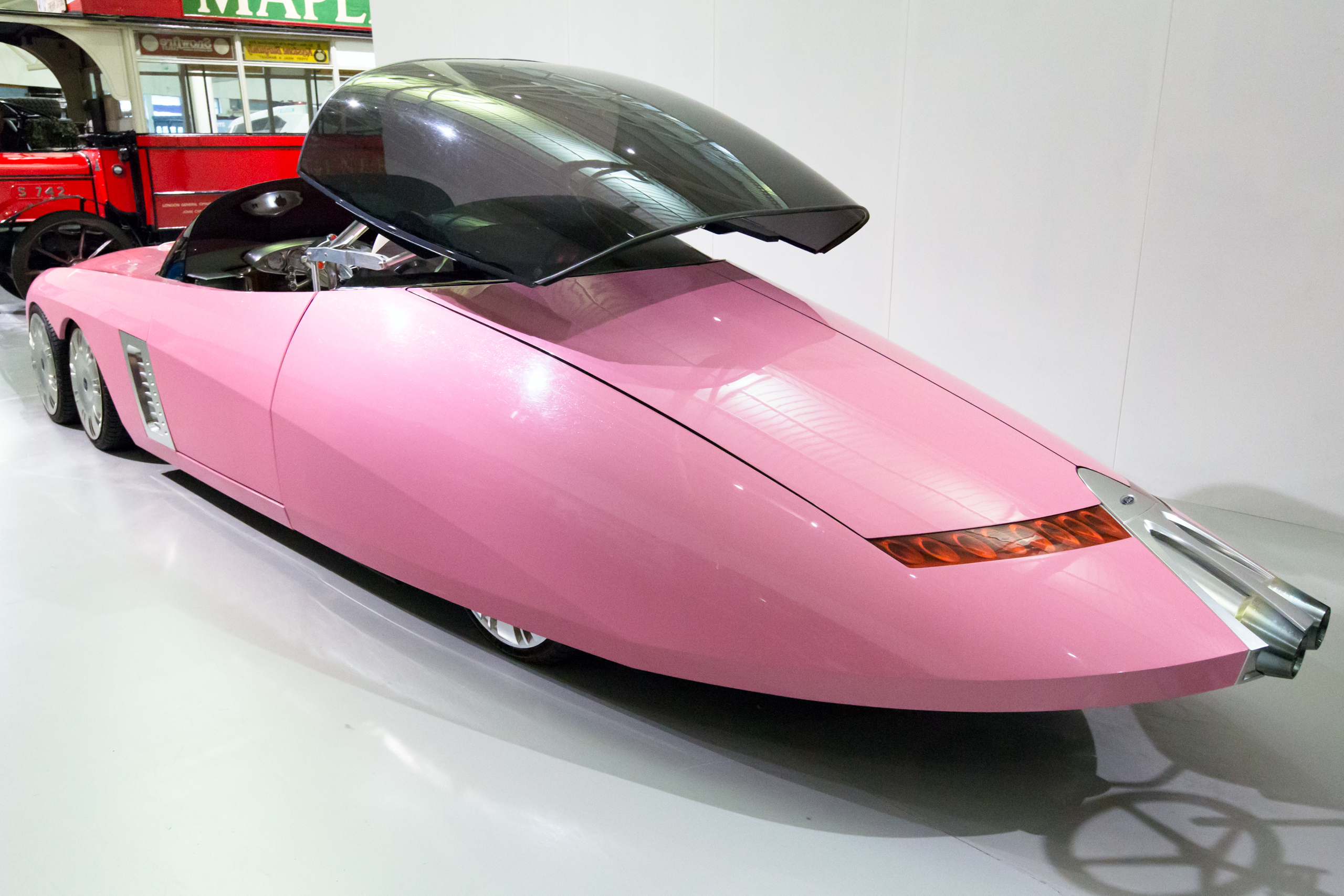
Side-rear view

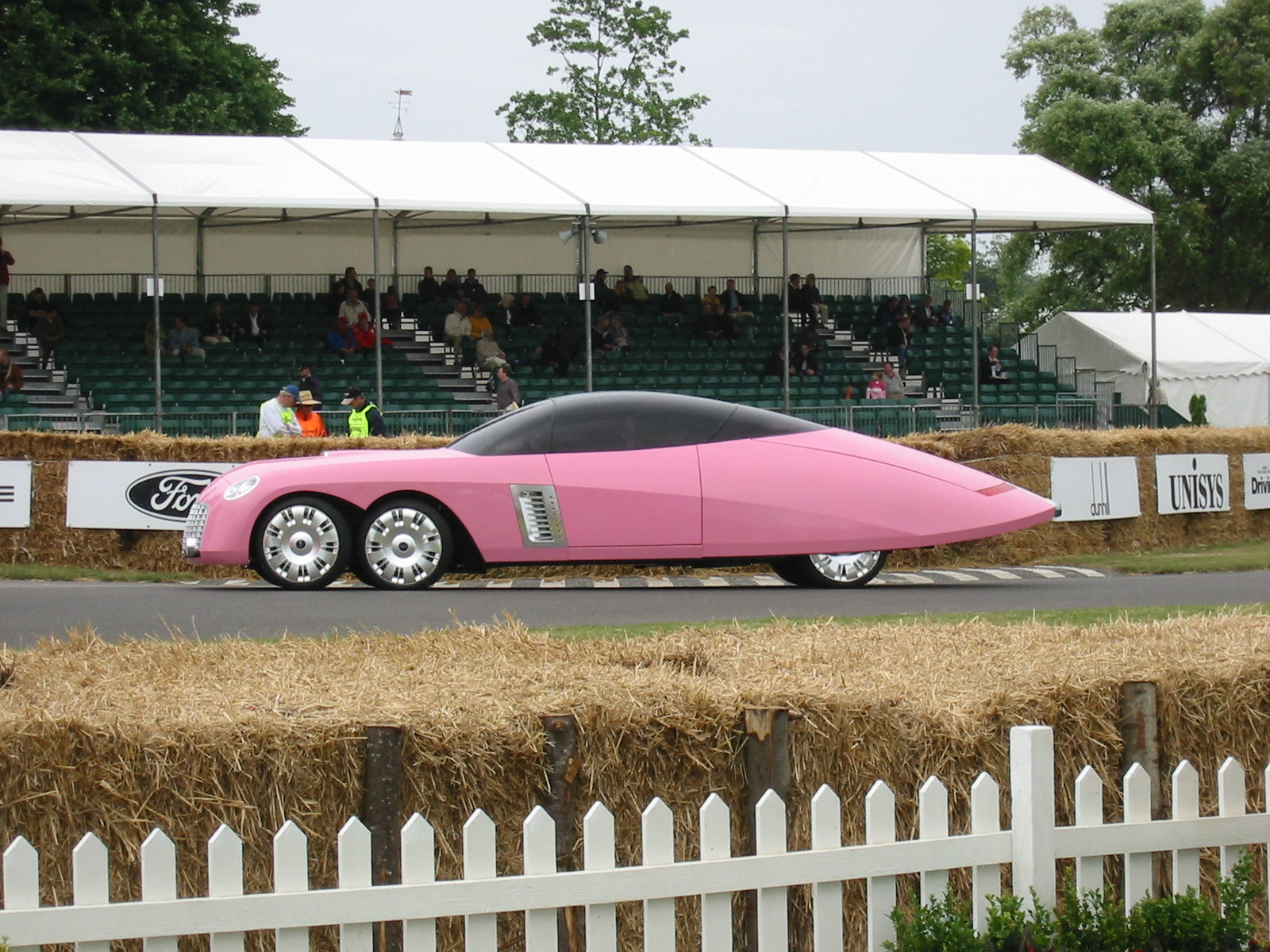
At the Goodwood Festival of Speed, 2004

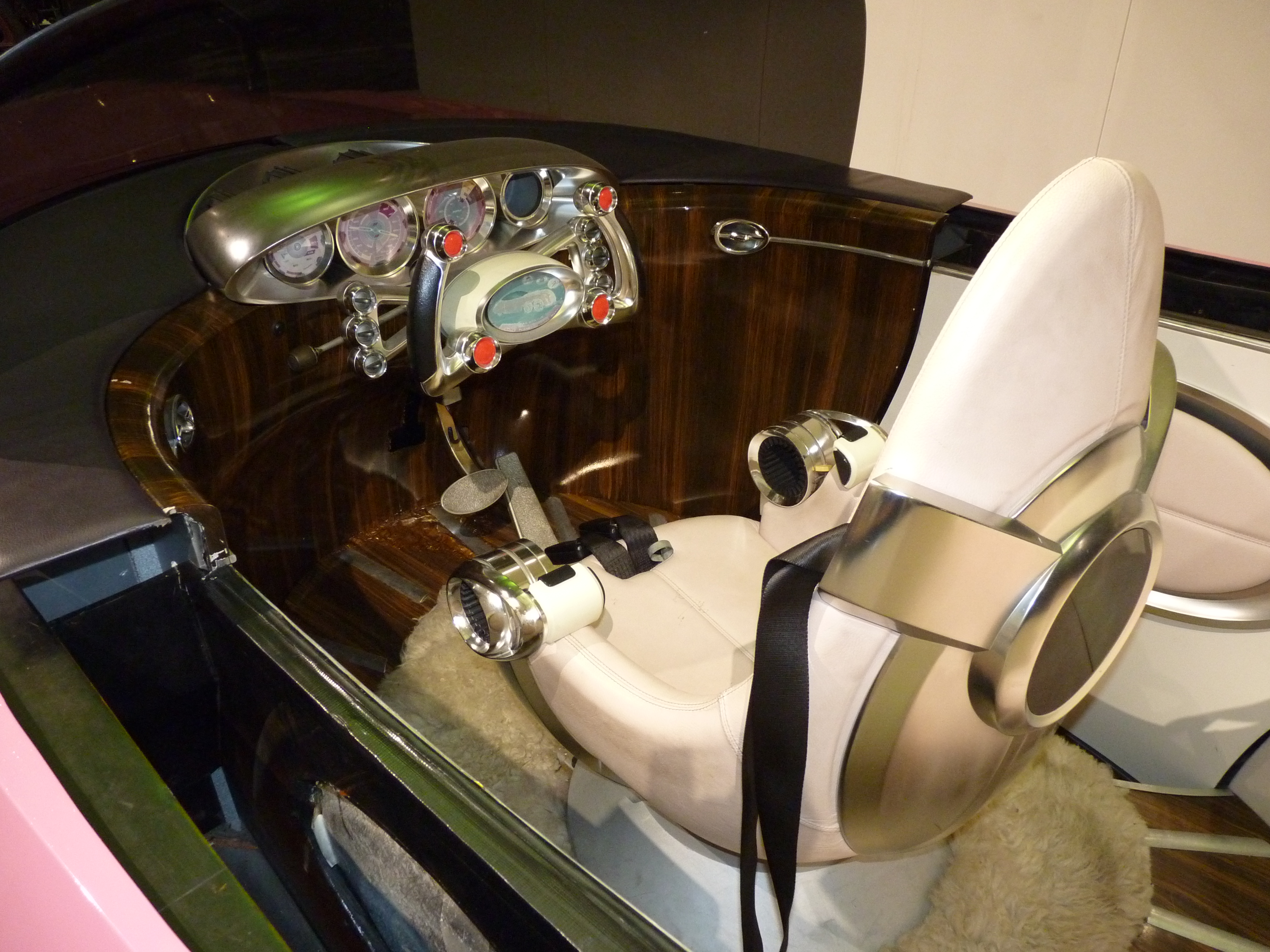
Interior, 2012

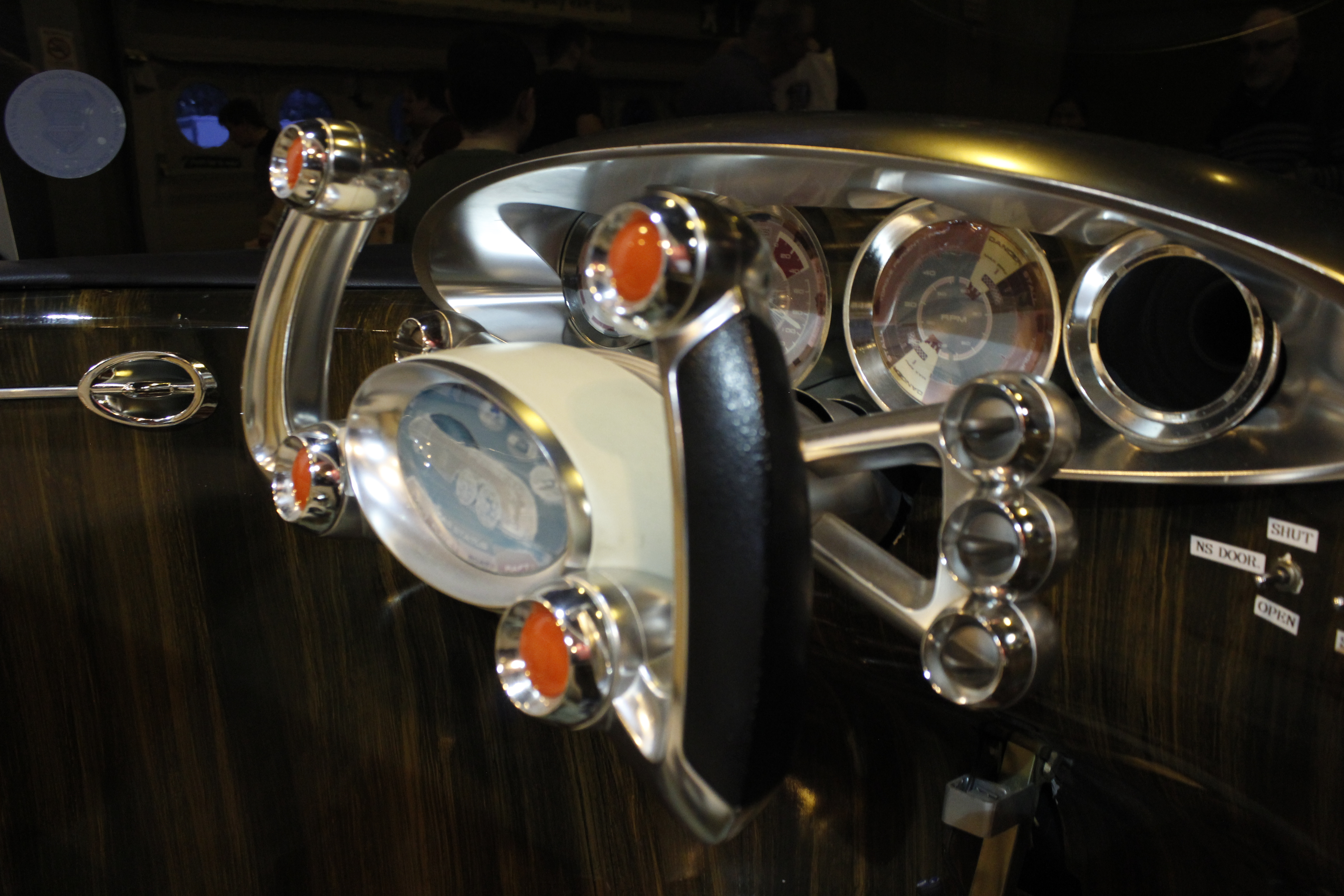
Interior close-up, 2015

=== Remake series ===
In the remake series Thunderbirds Are Go, FAB 1 is given a slightly different design that still retains a Rolls-Royce silhouette and is as close to a Rolls-Royce as possible without actually being one. It has the classic pink colour scheme from the original, but the colour is no longer solid throughout the body, as the hood and trunk covers are now a grey-silver (resembling the real Rolls-Royce Ghost "FAB-1" charity car). The headlights are more streamlined and the wheels are larger, though the tires are thinner. It still retains the same role it has in the original series with new features compared to its original counterpart, being capable of flying much like its live-action counterpart and can also travel under water. All machine guns have been removed, including the one in the grille, and replaced with explosives such as missiles and torpedoes but still retains the smoke screen and oil slick dispensers.

== Replica cars ==
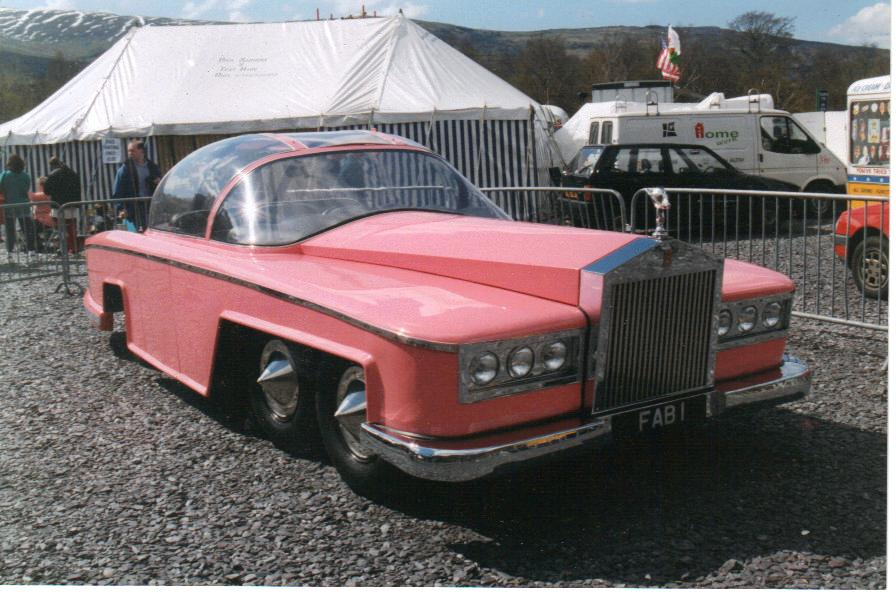
Life-sized replica of the original series FAB 1, photographed in 1998

In 1968 (not 1966, as many mistakenly believe), a 22-foot-long (6.7 m) replica of FAB 1, based on a "Chinese six" (four front, two back) Bedford VAL coach chassis, was built to transport Gerry and Sylvia Anderson to the premiere of Thunderbird Six in London. Costing £10,000 (approximately £235,300 in 2023), it was constructed by the company Toby Baxter Contracts in Biggleswade, Bedfordshire under Sylvia's supervision. The replica had a fibreglass body and a Bedford six-cylinder petrol engine, connected to a two-speed Powerglide gearbox. The axles were widened to fit the width of the body, which was a steel-covered framework "moulded" with filler to simulate the angles of the vehicle as seen in the TV series and films. The wheels were supplied by Land Rover, and the aluminium bumpers by a specialist welding company. The perspex sides lifted up on screws, while the sides of the body folded out and under the vehicle to form a step. The radiator grille, which was not vertical as in standard Rolls-Royce models, was custom-built and inclined forwards at the top, complete with moveable slats and imitation machine gun. As a number plate with the registration "FAB 1" had already been issued, the replica incorporated revolving plates that showed "FAB 1" on one side and the real registration on the other. The car made its first public appearance with model Penny Snow on 29 May 1968 at Woburn Abbey. The following month it appeared on Blue Peter with its many features being demonstrated by the Blue Peter team.

On the night of the premiere, the replica broke down after a few hundred yards and the Andersons were forced to complete the journey by taxi. Rolls-Royce were unimpressed by the car and made several attempts to buy it and have it destroyed. For a time, the company were successful in forcing the removal of the genuine Rolls-Royce grille, which was replaced with a facsimile bearing the initials "LP". After a full restoration, the vehicle was installed at the Cars of the Stars Motor Museum in Keswick, Cumbria in 1989. Concerned that the vehicle could distract motorists and even cause traffic accidents, the local police asked the museum's owner, Peter Nelson, not to drive it on public roads. Nelson described the car as "utterly scary [to drive] at any sort of speed." The car was subsequently sold to the Miami Auto Museum at the Dezer Collection in Florida (now the Orlando Auto Museum).

Gerry Anderson would later commission a second full-sized FAB 1 replica. This vehicle was a modified Rolls-Royce Silver Spirit, with the bonnet line extended to house the six-wheel drive, complemented by double Ackermann steering. It did not have the bubble canopy or centre-mounted steering of the original, and apart from the pink paint job and re-trim, the passenger compartment was stock Rolls-Royce. This model attended Anderson's funeral on 13 January 2013.

The UK vehicle registration "FAB 1" was first issued in July 1946. It was later assigned to a white Jaguar XJ6 before the number was purchased by broadcaster Chris Evans in 2012 for £75,000. In 2013, the registration was temporarily assigned to a bespoke pink Rolls-Royce Ghost that had been donated for use in raising breast cancer awareness.

== FAB 2 and FAB 3 ==
FAB 2, Lady Penelope's private yacht, appears in the Thunderbirds episode "The Man from MI.5". At the end of the episode, it is revealed that Parker has lost the ship in a game of poker. FAB 3, Penelope's racehorse, is kept at the Ascot stables and is the winner of many derby races.

== See also ==
- Covini C6W
- Ferrari 312T6
- Ford Seattle-ite XXI – 1962 concept car
- March 2-4-0 – Formula One racing car
- Panther 6
- Tyrrell P34 – Formula One race car campaigned 1976-1977
