= Dezerland Park Orlando =

Indoor entertainment center in Orlando, Florida

- Location: Orlando, Florida
- Coordinates: 28.4685°N 81.447867°W
- Address: 5250 International Drive
- Opened: 2003 (Festival Bay Mall); 2014 (Artegon Marketplace); 2020 (Dezerland Park Orlando)
- Closed: 2013 (Festival Bay Mall); 2017 (Artegon Marketplace)
- Developer: Belz Enterprises
- Owner: Dezer Development
- Num. of stores: 65
- Num. of anchor tenants: 6 (7 proposed)
- Floor area: 850,000 square feet (79,000 m^{2})
- Floors: 1 (2 in former Vans Skatepark and Bass Pro Shops)
- Public transit: LYNX: 8, 24, 42, 304; I-Ride Trolley: Green, Red
- Website: https://dezerlandpark.com/

Dezerland Park Orlando is an enclosed family entertainment center located on International Drive in Orlando, Florida, United States. The 850,000-square-foot (79,000 m^{2}) complex, opened in 2020, is operated by (and named for) real estate developer Michael Dezer. The park's primary attraction is the Orlando Auto Museum, a collection of over 2,000 vehicles and assorted memorabilia from Dezer's private collection; other attractions include video and pinball arcades, go-karts, bowling, laser tag, and miniature golf.

The building housing the park was originally opened in 2002 as Festival Bay Mall, an entertainment-focused indoor shopping mall anchored by Bass Pro Shops Outdoor World, Cinemark, Ron Jon Surf Shop, Sheplers Western Wear, Steve & Barry's University Sportswear, and Vans Skatepark. After closing in 2013, the mall was reopened in 2014 as Artegon Marketplace, an artisanal craft market, which operated until early 2017. Both Bass Pro Shops and Cinemark remain open under separate ownership, though the former is no longer accessible from Dezerland's interior.

== History ==
=== Festival Bay Mall ===
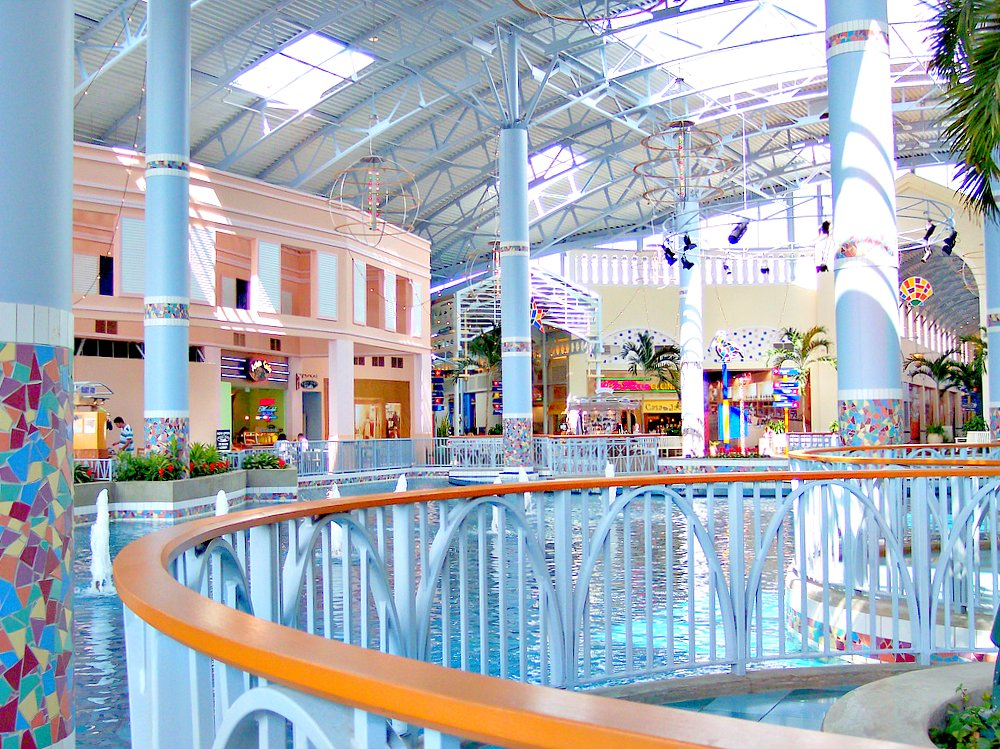
Atrium of Festival Bay Mall, including indoor lake (2006)

In 1998, developer Belz Enterprises announced plans for a 1.1-million-square-foot (100,000 m^{2}) shopping center, which would be built next to the company's existing Factory Outlet World and Designer Outlet Center complexes. Belz billed the mall as an "upscale entertainment complex" that would eschew traditional anchor stores in favor of unique retailers and entertainment venues. The mall was designed with a Caribbean waterfront theme and would feature a large manufactured lake at its front entrance and atrium.

Belz initially claimed that the mall would begin construction in late 1998 and open in 2000. While two anchor stores (namely Cinemark and Bass Pro Shops) opened at that time, construction on the mall proper did not begin until June 2001. The delay was attributed to permitting issues and a difficulty securing tenants amid the early 2000s recession. The mall officially opened on April 3, 2003, though many stores did not open until later in the year. In April 2004, one year after opening, Belz reported that the mall was 80% leased.

By late 2005, business at the mall had stagnated due to competition with The Mall at Millenia and Orlando Premium Outlets, as well poor visibility of the mall from Interstate 4 and a general decline in tourism. Belz contracted the mall's daily management out to General Growth Properties, who planned to target local shoppers.

==== Anchor stores ====
At the time of the mall's announcement, Bass Pro Shops had agreed to build a 162,000-square-foot (0.0151 km^{2}) anchor store. Later that year, Belz announced that Cinemark USA had agreed to build a 20-screen movie theater. Both were the first Central Florida locations for their respective chains. In 1999, Ron Jon Surf Shop and Vans both announced plans for 50,000-square-foot (4,600 m^{2}) stores, with Vans's containing an indoor skatepark. Ron Jon's store would later be downsized to 20,000 square feet (1,900 m^{2}); it opened in June 2003. Closer to opening, Sheplers Western Wear and Steve & Barry's University Sportswear were announced as additional anchors.

In 2000, local architect C.T. Hsu announced plans for Factory Funhouse and Festival Boardwalk, a $60 million amusement park consisting of a 20,000-square-foot (1,900 m^{2}) indoor complex and a 15-acre (6.1 ha) outdoor boardwalk, which would serve as the mall's seventh anchor. However, the project was put on hold in 2002 when an investor pulled out, leaving the anchor plot at the mall's rear undeveloped. In 2004, it was announced that the plot would instead host Ron Jon Surf Park, a complex featuring multiple wave pools, a surfing academy, and a surfing gear shop. However, construction was delayed due to high development costs and was put on indefinite hold in 2008.

The Steve & Barry's store closed in 2009 when the company went bankrupt. In January 2012, Vans Skatepark was closed when the company chose not to renew its lease.

=== Artegon Marketplace ===
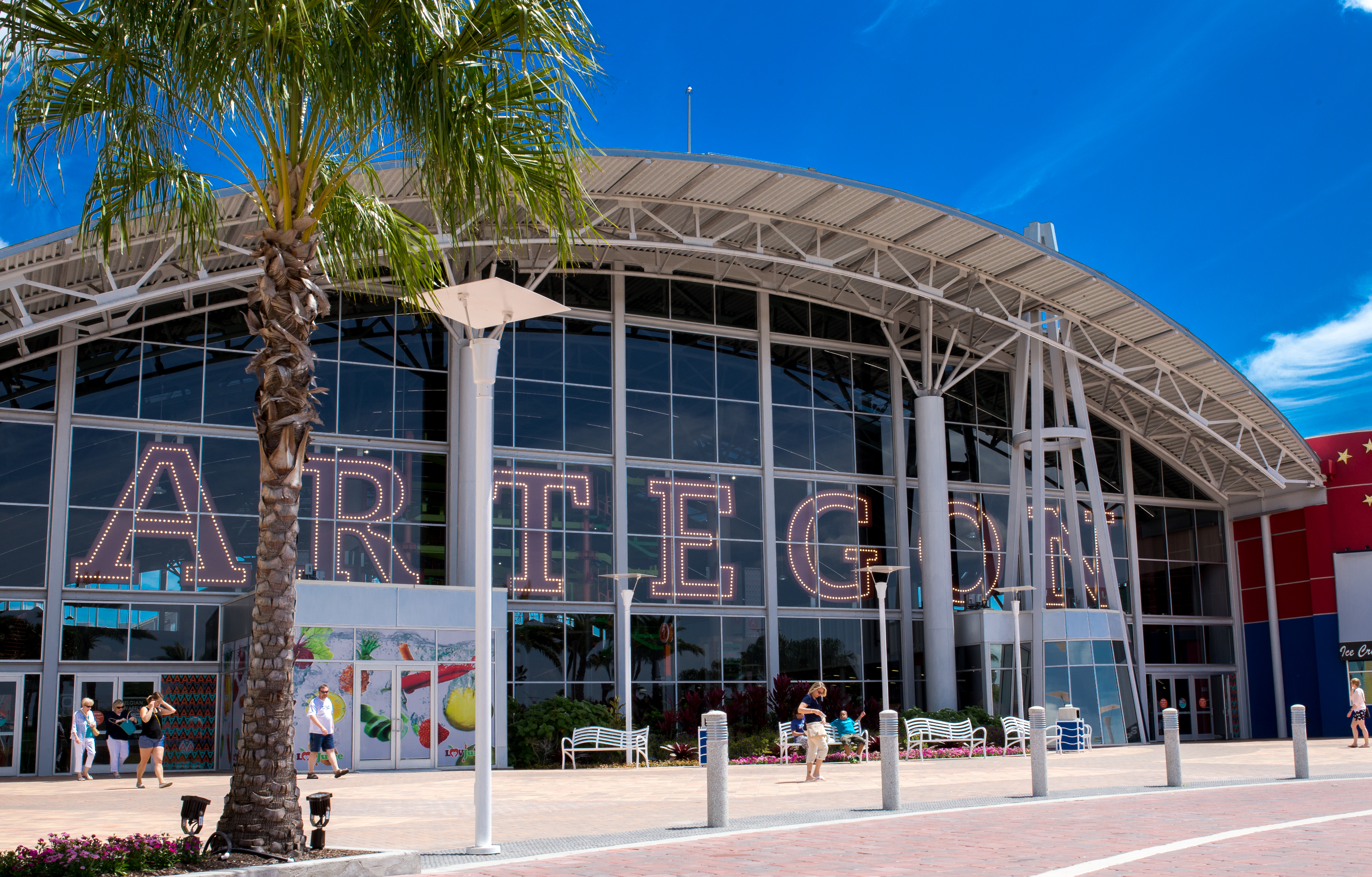
Main entrance to Artegon Marketplace (2016)

In late 2010, the mall was sold to Paragon Outlet Partners, a division of The Lightstone Group, for $25 million, who initially planned to redevelop the site as an open-air center called Paragon Shoppes Orlando. Following three years of planning, Paragon instead announced a $70 million renovation of Festival Bay Mall into Artegon Marketplace, an artisanal craft market similar to Chelsea Market.

Festival Bay's indoor lake and Caribbean theming were removed in favor of a modern industrial theme, and two-thirds of the mall's original retail space was converted into 165 small stalls (40–300 square feet (3.7–27.9 m^{2}) in size) for local artisanal vendors. The mall's existing anchor stores were retained, and several others were planned, including a beer hall, a large comic book shop, a Toby Keith's I Love This Bar & Grill restaurant, and a redesigned skatepark. An expansion, which would renovate the rest of the mall and add a farmer's market in the former Steve & Barry's location, was also planned. Artegon Marketplace opened on November 20, 2014.

In 2015, Gods & Monsters, a 20,000-square-foot (1,900 m^{2}) comic book shop and bar, opened. Toby Keith's I Love This Bar & Grill was also opened, but it closed after seven months due to financial issues with its owner.

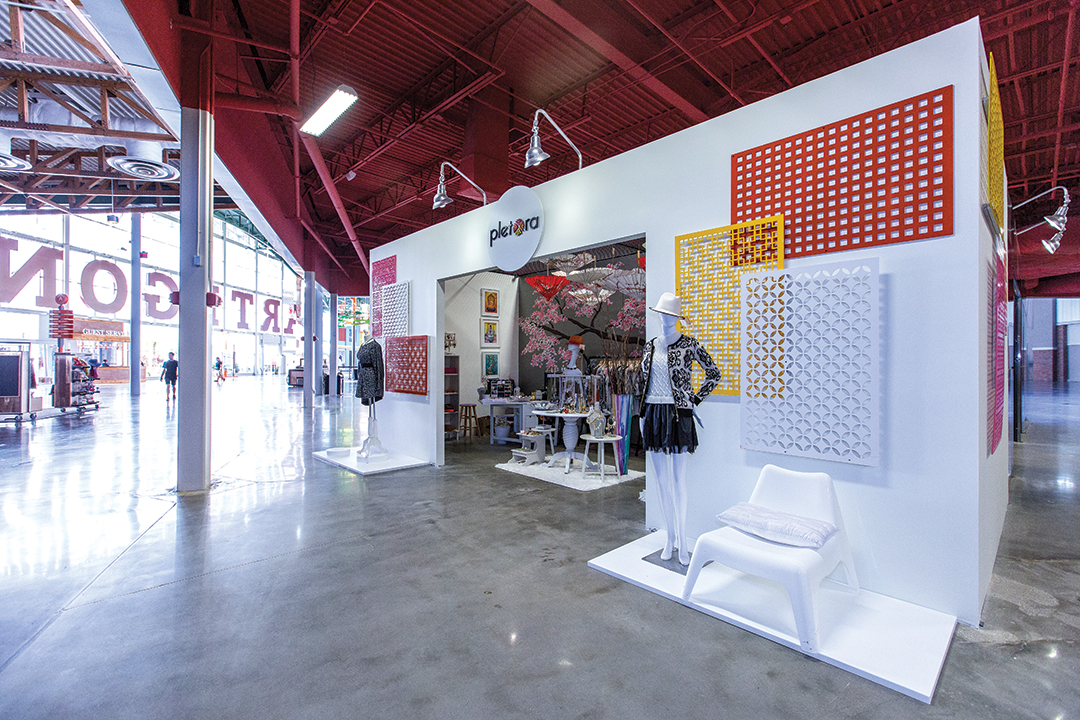
Artisan stall at Artegon Marketplace (2016)

In November 2015, Artegon Marketplace was transferred from Paragon to the direct control of Lightstone and received new management. The new management announced plans for a 25,000-square-foot (2,300 m^{2}) food hall and replaced the original stalls with larger ones that could be decorated by the vendors. At the same time, the company sold off the land parcels containing Bass Pro Shops and Cinemark for a combined $30 million.

In mid-2016, a planned bridge over Interstate 4 caused a spike in developer interest for northern International Drive. Amidst this, Lightstone put the mall property up for potential sale, leading to rumors that the structure would be replaced with a theme park. On January 18, 2017, Lightstone announced that the mall would close two weeks later on January 26. Lightstone only gave vendors at the mall two weeks of notice for the closure, with some having just signed leases. Several vendors filed suit against the company in response. Local competitor Altamonte Mall later opened a smaller-scale artisanal market for former Artegon vendors.

=== Dezerland Park Orlando ===
Following a year of lawsuit-related delays, the property was purchased in January 2018 by Michael Dezer, a South Florida-based developer, for $23.7 million. Dezer planned to convert the structure into Dezerland Action Park, an indoor theme park similar to his Xtreme Action Park in Fort Lauderdale. Two months later, the Miami Auto Museum at the Dezer Collection was closed, with much of its collection being transferred to Dezerland Action Park for a planned auto museum. In 2019, construction was briefly halted due to a permitting issue.

The park, by then renamed to simply Dezerland Park Orlando, held a soft opening on December 14, 2020. At this point, the park featured a bowling alley, a go-kart track and an arcade, as well as a glow-in-the-dark miniature golf course which dated back to Festival Bay. Additional segments of the park, including the 250,000-square-foot (23,000 m^{2}) Orlando Auto Museum, were gradually opened in the following months. Dezer also planned to construct three apartment buildings and a car dealership at the property.

== See also ==
- Volo Auto Museum
- Miami Auto Museum at the Dezer Collection
