= Michael Dezer =

Real estate developer

- מייקל דזר
- Born: Michael Dezertzov; 1 April 1941 (age 85); Tel Aviv, Israel
- Occupation: Real estate developer
- Known for: Real estate developer and car collector
- Spouse: Neomi Kerekes
- Children: 3
- Website: dezerdevelopment.com/about/

Michael Dezer (Hebrew: מייקל דזר), born Michael Dezertzov, is an Israeli-American real estate developer, car collector, and billionaire. He is the founder of Dezer Properties and is known for his investments in New York and Florida real estate in association with Donald Trump.

== Biography ==
Dezer was born in a working-class family in Tel Aviv, Israel , the son of a bus driver. He served in the Israeli Air Force.

In 1962, he migrated from Israel to the U.S. where he went to night school and worked in advertising, before starting a typesetting business.

In 1970, he founded Dezer Properties and started investing in real estate in New York City, focusing on the Chelsea neighborhood, which was then transitioning into an arts community from a manufacturing center. He focused on converting factory buildings into luxury office cooperatives. By 1994, he owned 15 buildings in the area.

Starting in 1985, he purchased as much ocean-front land in Sunny Isles Beach as he could, much of which was old motels. In partnership with Donald Trump, he developed properties there including the $900 million Trump Towers, the $600 million Trump Grande Ocean Resort and Residences, and the $166 million Trump International Hotel and Tower. At Sunny Island Beaches he also developed the Porsche Design Tower which has sunken into the ground already 8 cm since it was completed in 2017.

Dezer is also the landlord of the luxury auto retailer Manhattan Motorcars.

== Personal life ==
=== Family ===
Dezer is Jewish, of Russian descent. He is married to fellow Israeli Neomi (née Kerekes) and has three children: daughters Leslie Dezer Salmon (born 1970) and Estee Dezer Gurwitz (born 1978); and son Gil Dezer (born 1975). All his children participate in the family business. Gil Dezer, also a car collector, developed the 60-story Porsche Design Tower in Sunny Isles Beach.

=== Car collection ===
Dezer collects cars and displays over 1,000 cars from his collection in the Orlando Auto Museum formerly [Miami Auto Museum]]. The collection has diverse types of cars including European and American classic cars, microcars, movie cars, supercars, and military vehicles. He also has motorcycles, scooters, bicycles and the largest collection of Vespas displayed at the museum. He launched 2 outposts of his main Miami Auto Museum. In 2014, he opened the Hollywood Cars Museum in Las Vegas by partnering with classic and exotic car dealer Hot Rod City to display more than 100 cars from movies, TV shows and videos. In 2016, he spent $3.6 million on a space in Xtreme Action Park in Fort Lauderdale to open the second outpost of his main museum to display about 200 cars.

== Political contributions ==
Ahead of the 2016 United States elections, Dezer donated $100,000 to Trump's Make America Great Again PAC and $200,000 to the Trump Victory Committee. Ahead of the 2020 United States elections, he donated $100,000 to the Trump Victory Committee.

Starting in 2017 during Donald Trump's first term as President and continuing during his second term, a Gulfstream IV private jet owned by Dezer was used for more than 50 flights deporting migrants from the United States, including deportations to third countries such as Eswatini where those migrants had no ties, and where they were held in prison indefinitely. Per the Miami Herald in 2020, ICE paid approximately $35,000 for each detainee deported using this aircraft.

== Criminal probe ==
In May 2017, Brazilian Federal Police launched "Operation Miami Connection" to shut down a money laundering scheme it accused Dezer Properties of being involved in. Dezer Properties is behind the Porsche Design Towers Brava, a luxury condominium to open in 2022 that is being marketed to foreigners in Praia Brava on Santa Catarina Island in Brazil. The Brazilian authorities alleged that a contractor laundered more than R$12 million (US$4 million) through Dezer Properties as "licensing fees" paid to Porsche SE. According to Brazilian media, the FBI and the Brazilian federal police are cooperating on the investigation, which involves three businessmen from the United States and Germany.
