= Miami Auto Museum at the Dezer Collection =

Former automobile museum in Miami, Florida

Coordinates: 25.9097°N 80.1589°W

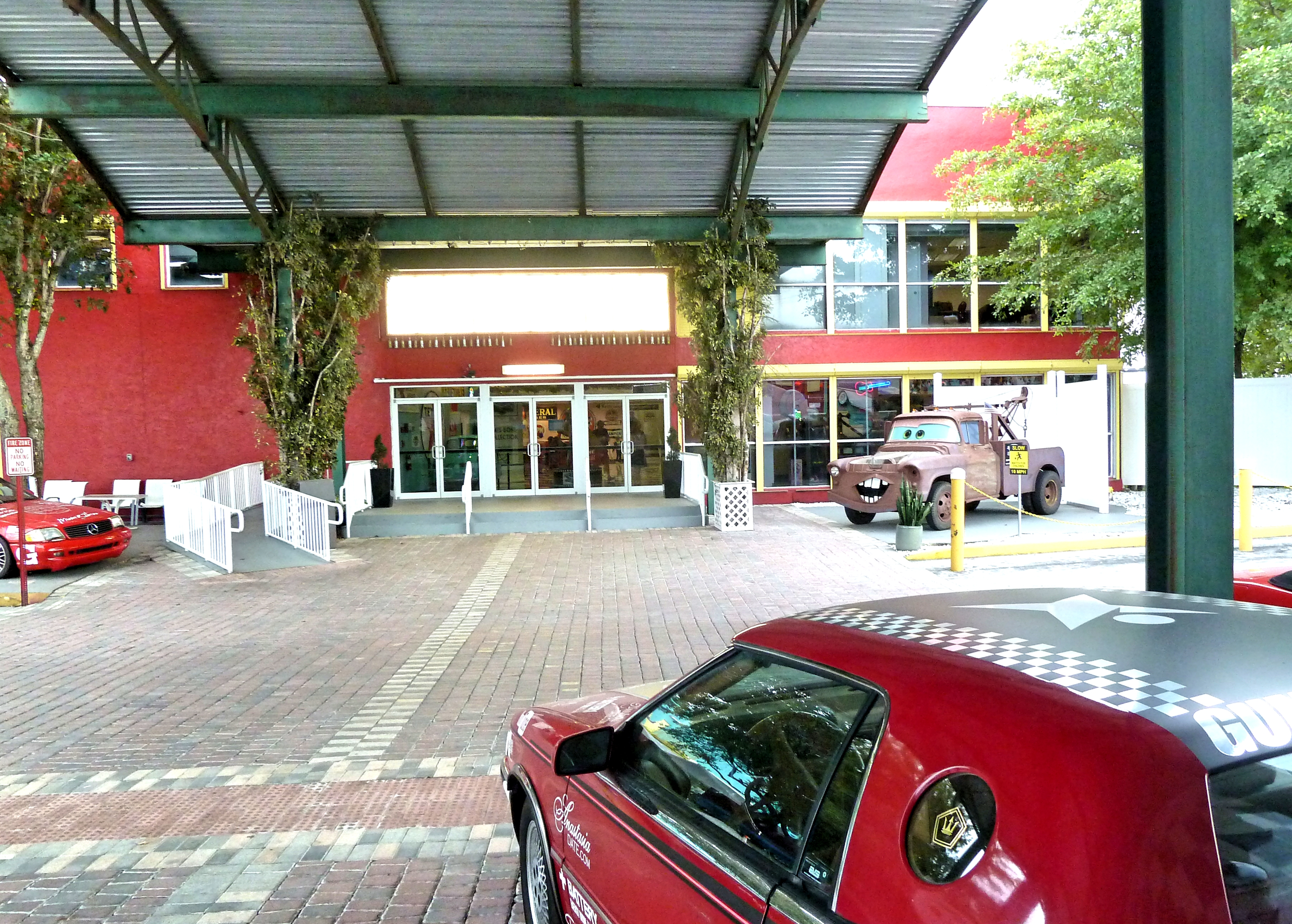
Entrance of the Miami Auto Museum in North Miami, Florida

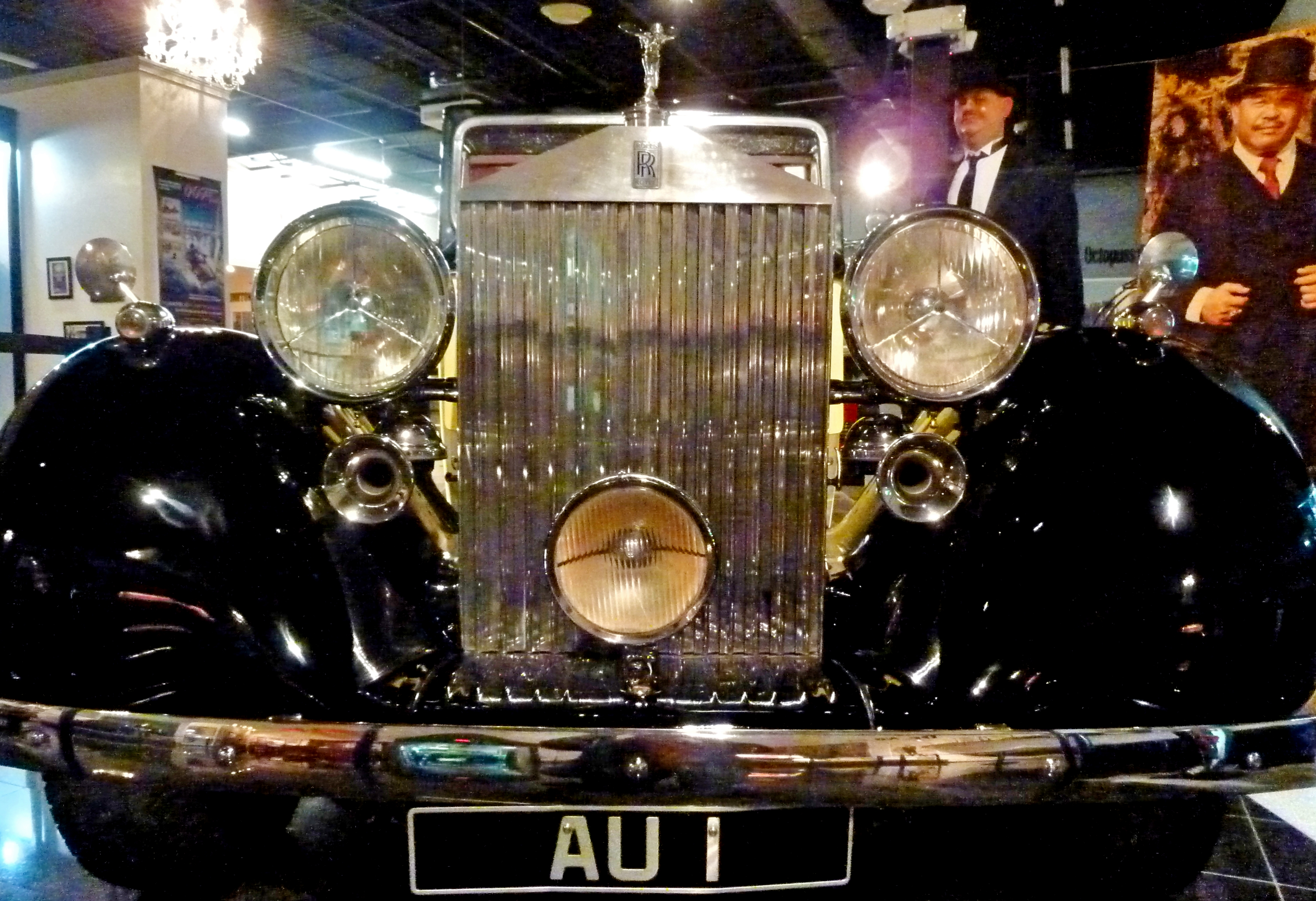
Rolls-Royce Phantom III from the James Bond movie Goldfinger (1964)

The Miami Auto Museum at the Dezer Collection was a privately owned museum in North Miami, Florida, that exhibited automobiles and related memorabilia collected by Michael Dezer. It has closed and is being moved to Orlando, Florida, to be opened as the Orlando Auto Museum within Dezerland Park Orlando.

The museum was housed in two large warehouse buildings, one for the Hollywood Collection, the other for the Classic Car Collection. The Hollywood Collection displayed cars and vehicles used in movies or by the stars, among them a collection of James Bond cars and Batman cars. The other collection showed classic American and European cars, micro-cars, military vehicles, motorcycles, scooters, bicycles, and various related memorabilia. The exhibition areas exceeded 250,000 square feet and was capable of displaying more than 1,000 vehicles.

Cars included in the collection are the 1948 Ford from Grease, the 1959 Cadillac from Ghostbusters (a replica), the 1981 DeLorean from Back to the Future, an original Batmobile, the Land Rover from Skyfall, and a T-55 Soviet tank from GoldenEye. In 2011, the museum acquired the original Pursuit Special driven by Max Rockatansky in Mad Max and Mad Max 2.

The collection was started by Micheal Dezer, an Israeli-born real estate developer, after he got a Vespa scooter at the age of 16. The museum evolved from the holding place for his collection and was opened in 2012 (13 years ago). It incorporated the Cars of the Stars Motor Museum purchased from England.
