= Hopper Academy =

- U.S. National Register of Historic Places
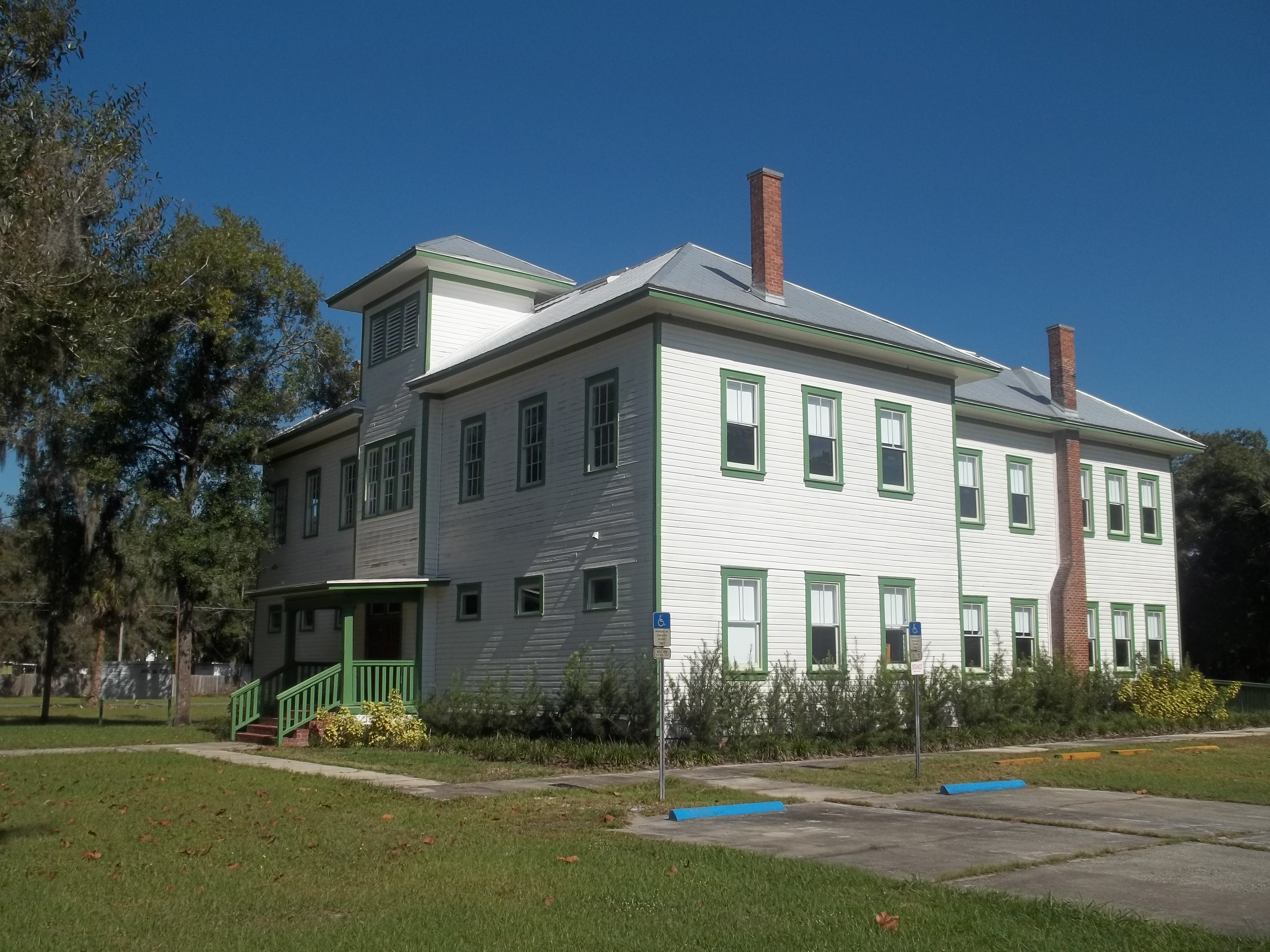

- Location within Florida Location within the United States
- Location: 1101 Pine Ave. Sanford, Florida
- Coordinates: 28.8024°N 81.2624°W
- Built: 1906
- NRHP reference No.: 15000209
- Added to NRHP: May 6, 2015

Hopper Academy is a former school for African Americans in Sanford, Florida. It closed in the early 1960s, was used by the school district, and was then abandoned and fell into disrepair. It has been restored and is now a community center. It is on the Florida Black Heritage Trail and listed on the National Register of Historic Places.

The two-story wooden schoolhouse was built in 1906. William C. McLester was the school's first principal. Joseph N. Crooms also served as one of its principals. Following the completion of Crooms Academy in 1926, Hopper was converted to an elementary and middle school, housing kindergarten through eighth grade. It closed in the 1960s and fell into disrepair.

The building is being restored for use as a community center. It is part of the Florida Black History Heritage Trail. It was added to the National Register of Historic Places in 2015. It is located in the Georgetown section of Sanford.

== See also ==
- National Register of Historic Places listings in Seminole County, Florida
