= Crooms =

Crooms is a surname. Notable people with the surname include:

- Chris Crooms (born 1969), American football player
- Harold Crooms (born 1979), American stock car racing driver
- Joseph N. Crooms (1880–1957), African-American principal and educator

== See also ==
- Crooms Academy of Information Technology
- Croom (name)
