= Lyman High School (Florida) =

School in Longwood, Florida, United States

Location
- 865 South Ronald Reagan Boulevard; Longwood, Florida 32750; United States; 28°41′10.8″N 81°20′41.4″W

Information
- Type: Public
- Motto: "From Promising to Proven"
- Established: 1924
- School district: Seminole County Public Schools
- Principal: Michael Hunter
- Staff: 95.21 (on an FTE basis)
- Grades: 9–12
- Enrollment: 2,084 (2022–23)
- Student to teacher ratio: 21.89
- Colors: Blue and Gold
- Nickname: Greyhounds
- Rival: Lake Brantley High School
- Website: lyman.scps.k12.fl.us

Lyman High School is a public high school located in Longwood, Florida. The school was founded in 1924.

== History ==
The school's namesake, the Lyman twins, arrived in the area upon the invitation of Congressman Charles Delemere Haines. After Seminole County voted to separate from Orange County, in 1920, the Lymans and other citizens of the area voted to incorporate the city of Altamonte Springs. By 1923, it became apparent that the established school houses in the area did not adequately meet the needs of the growing population.

At a board of trustees meeting it was suggested that the cities of Lake Mary, Longwood and Altamonte Springs consolidate and create one school building. Because of its distance from the other two cities, Lake Mary opted to create its own school, while the cities of Longwood and Altamonte Springs consolidated into one school.

Construction of the new school began in 1924. Howard Lyman died a few days before the construction of the school began. In appreciation of his work, the school was named after him. Lyman School opened in September 1924 with Howard Douglas as the principal. By 1926, the school had become an accredited junior high school, and enrollment had increased to a degree where it was necessary to add six rooms to the building. In 1929, Lyman School was accredited through the twelfth grade under the leadership of W.J. Wells, Jr.

Lyman School was renamed Lyman High School in 1963 when it became an accredited institution under the leadership of Carlton D. Henley. Three years later, Lyman High School became fully integrated, admitting its first black students in 1966. In 1969, Lyman High School moved to a newly constructed state-of-the-art campus approximately 1/4 mile to the north, while the former Lyman campus became R. T. Milwee Junior High School, named after Rayburn T. Milwee, Sr., a former Lyman teacher (1939-1949), Lyman principal (1949-1952) and Superintendent of Seminole County Schools (1952-1967). As originally envisioned, Milwee Junior High School was to become a second junior high for grades 7 through 9, feeding into Lyman along with the pre-existing South Seminole Junior High School in Casselberry. Students residing in Milwee's catchment area that were attending South Seminole Junior High were transferred to Milwee. The year before the transfer, students who would attend Milwee were allowed to vote on a new school mascot for the school. They chose the name, Spartans.

In the fall of 1970, Seminole County transitioned to a "middle school" concept and all existing junior high schools were redesignated as middle schools. Under this concept, all elementary schools would now incorporate mandatory kindergarten programs and accommodate students in grades K through 5. Middle schools would incorporate 6th grade students formerly in the elementary schools and accommodate grades 6 through 8. Finally, 9th grade programs previously resident in the junior high schools would transfer to the senior high schools, making all high schools grade 9 through 12 institutions. However, explosive population growth in South Seminole County during the 1960s made such a transition less than optimal. During the 1970-71 academic year, the inclusion of 9th grade students from the former South Seminole Junior High School mandated "double sessions" for the first time in Lyman High School's history. Under double sessions, approximately 50% of Lyman's students began class at 7:00am, finishing at 1:30pm. At 11:30am, the second cohort of students would arrive, finishing at 6:00pm. The comparatively new Lyman campus, originally constructed for approximately 1500 students, now housed well in excess of 2,000, especially during peak loading between 11:30am and 1:30pm, mandating the installation and use of numerous portable classrooms on the campus.

In June 1971, Milwee Middle School was closed and its 7th and 8th grade students for the September 1971 - June 1972 academic year transferred to the newly completed Teague Middle School near Forest City. The former Milwee Middle School, e.g., the original Lyman campus, then became a "satellite campus" of Lyman High School for the 1971-72 academic year, providing additional classroom facilities for primarily 9th and 10th grade students. It was not unusual for students, especially 10th grade, to have classes on both campuses, commuting between both via shuttle bus or on foot in a manner similar to college/university students. The following academic year, 1972–73, all Lyman students returned to the main campus. That same year, Lake Brantley High School was established with 9th and 10th grade students, using the former Milwee-cum-Lyman "satellite campus" until its permanent facility in Forest City was completed in mid-1973. Lyman's last "3 year program" (grades 10-12) class graduated in 1973 and its first "4 year program" (grades 9-12) class graduated in 1974. The 1974 class was also Lyman's then-largest ever graduating class at that time, numbering over 740 students. It was also the last graduating class whose population contained students from nearly all of South Seminole County, to include the entire catchment area for Lake Brantley High School, the entire catchment areas for the later constructed Lake Howell High School and major portions of the catchment areas for the later constructed Lake Mary High School and Winter Springs High School.

As principal from 1963 through 1994, Carlton Henley was primarily responsible for bringing approximately $900,000 in grant money to Lyman High School and Seminole County. Henley also developed one of the most highly technological high schools in the state, as well as the institution of the double-period schedule for students, a dropout prevention program, a staff development program for teachers, and provided leadership for the development of the most comprehensive athletic facility of any high school in the state. In 1984, he was named Florida Principal of the Year. Principal Henley retired in 1994 after more than 30 years at the helm of Lyman High School. Following his time as Principal of Lyman High School Henley was appointed to the Seminole County Commission, elected to the Seminole County School Board, and in 1998 elected to Seminole County Commission where he served for 20 years until retiring at the age of 85.

The end of the Henley years had ushered in a new era for Lyman. This included the 75th Anniversary celebration in 1999 with the creation of the Lyman High School Hall of Fame and, in 2000, the creation of the Lyman High School Academy of Engineering.

== Athletics ==
The Greyhounds participate in over 20 athletic programs of the Florida High School Athletic Association (FHSAA). The school competes in Division 6A and offers programs for both, boys and girls and includes freshman, junior varsity, and varsity sports.

Fall sports offered include football, swimming, golf, girls' volleyball, cross-country, and bowling.

Winter sports offered include basketball, wrestling, and soccer.

Spring sports offered include baseball, track and field, softball, boys' volleyball, tennis, water polo, and lacrosse.

== Performing arts ==
The Lyman High School Marching Greyhounds

Lyman is also host to a high school Color Guard and Winterguard program. Lyman is part of a High School Scholastic A unit competing for Florida Federation of Colorguards Circuit and with Winter Guard International. In the 2012-2013 winter guard season the Diamonds were bumped down to the scholastic a class but placed 1st at the FFCC championships.

The Lyman High School Marching Greyhounds have performed at the Walt Disney World Holiday Parade, the Daytona 500, the Macy's Thanksgiving Day Parade, Chick-fil-A Bowl and the Washington DC Cherry Blossom Festival.

== Notable alumni ==
- James (Jim) Bacchus - Class of 1967; former US Congressman (D-FL)
- Kevin Beary - Class of 1975; Orange County sheriff (1993–2009)
- Chris Brock - Former MLB player
- Lee Constantine - Class of 1970; Florida State Senator for the 22nd district of Florida (2001–present)
- Santiago Espinal - MLB player
- Danielle Fotopoulos - Class of 1994; member of the 1999 US national soccer team
- Tony Jones - Class of 2015; CFL football player for the Edmonton Elks
- Al Latimer - NFL player
- Mark Lewis - Arena Football League player
- Carlos Navarro - Actor on the Walking Dead and local radio host
- Mark Pontius - drummer for Foster the People and Malbec
- Courtney Schulhoff - convicted murderer; non-graduate dropout
- Ian Williams (football player) - Class of 2007; NFL player
