= Forrest Lake =

American politician

- Forrest Lake c. 1910

Personal details
- Born: July 15, 1868 Newberry, South Carolina, US
- Died: January 24, 1939 (aged 70) Sanford, Florida, US
- Resting place: Evergreen Cemetery
- Party: Democratic Party
- Spouse: Mary Maude Anno
- Children: Sarita; Maude
- Occupation: Banker

Forrest Lake (July 15, 1868 – January 24, 1939) was a prominent politician, banker, real estate investor, a mayor of Sanford, Florida and a member of the Florida House of Representatives. Lake had an instrumental role in the formation of Seminole County. In 1928, Lake was convicted of embezzlement and served 3 years of a 14-year sentence.

== Early life ==
Lake was born in Newberry, South Carolina on July 15, 1868. After spending some time in Cuba, he moved to Sanford, Florida in 1886. Seven years later, he became mayor of Sanford. He married Mary Maude Anno in Orlando in 1895.

Lake influenced the Florida state legislature to pass a bill creating Seminole County by splitting off a portion of Orange County in April 1913, furthering his political career. He served in the Florida House of Representatives as the Orange County representative in 1911 and 1913, and as the Seminole County representative in 1915 and 1923.

== Sanford Charter Bill ==
In 1911, the community of Sanford Heights seceded from Sanford, because of discord over municipal services provided by Sanford. This added to concerns that Sanford's ability to expand would be constrained by the surrounding towns of Goldsboro, Georgetown and Sanford Heights, as well as Lake Monroe to the north. Lake led legislative efforts to curtail Sanford Heights ability to incorporate, independent of Sanford. Goldsboro was also a target in Lake's annexation process. On April 6, 1911, the Sanford city council passed a resolution to annex Goldsboro and on April 26, 1911 the Florida legislature passed the Sanford Charter Bill, dissolving the incorporation of both Sanford and Goldsboro, and reorganizing Sanford as a city that included Goldsboro within its boundaries.

== Embezzlement ==
In 1913, Lake sold his icehouse and organized the Seminole County Bank in Sanford's Welbourne building. He was elected president by a board that included some of the new county's most prominent men. His real estate investments faltered during the declining years of the real estate boom period of the 1920s. In 1916, he started construction of the 158-room Hotel Forrest Lake (later named the Mayfair Inn) on the shore of Lake Monroe. The hotel opened in 1925. The posh hotel, built at a cost of one half million dollars resulted in a five million dollar loss for him and his co-investors. Over the next few years, Lake experience similar financial losses. The Seminole Country Bank closed on August 6, 1927, and the following year, Lake and the bank's vice president A. R. Key, were indicted by a grand jury on charges of embezzling $553,000 from the bank.

Key pleaded guilty to two charges, and testified against Lake for the prosecution. After a series of five jury trials, Lake was convicted of five bank fraud charges on May 4, 1928: embezzlement of bank funds, three years; misapplication of bank funds, three years, the two to run concurrently; making a false entry in the bank records, three years; making an overloan to himself, four years; and another misapplication of funds, four years. He was sentenced to a 14 years prison term by Judge Dewitt Gray. He served 16 months of his sentence at Raiford prison before being released on a bond to pursue an appeal. In 1933, he lost the appeal before the state pardon board and was sent back to prison. He would serve six years before he won a pardon from the governor and returned to Sanford. Six months later, he regained his civil rights.

== Later life ==
Lake returned to Sanford—a broken man living on the streets of Sanford with others struggling to get through the Depression years—where he lived for the remainder of his life. Following a two-week-long illness, Lake died on January 24, 1939. He was buried at Evergreen Cemetery in Sanford, next to his wife.
