= Oviedo High School =

Location
- 601 King Street; Oviedo, Florida 32765; United States; 28°40′20″N 81°13′10″W

Information
- Type: Public high school
- Established: 1922
- School district: Seminole County Public Schools
- Principal: Trent Daniel
- Teaching staff: 113.36 (FTE)
- Enrollment: 2,267 (2023-2024)
- Student to teacher ratio: 20.00
- Colors: Orange and Black
- Nickname: Lions
- Information: 407-320-4050
- Website: www.oviedo.scps.k12.fl.us

Oviedo High School is a grade 9–12 public secondary school set on a 52-acre (21 ha) campus in Oviedo, Florida, a community situated in southeastern Seminole County operated by Seminole County Public Schools.

== Academics ==
Oviedo High School has been rated an A-school by the Florida Department of Education 18 out of the 21 years since the Florida school accountability system was introduced in 2000 (exception 2009 [B], 2004 [C], and 2003 [B]).

== Athletics ==
The school's athletic teams are known as the Lions. The school offers bowling, cross country, football, golf, swimming, and volleyball, as fall sports; basketball, soccer, girls weight lifting and wrestling as winter sports; and lacrosse, baseball, softball, tennis, track and field, girl's flag football, beach volleyball, and water polo as spring sports.

Oviedo is classified by the Florida High School Athletic Association as a Class 8A high school. In February 2007 the school's wrestling team won its fourth consecutive state championship, becoming the only team ever in the history of Florida high school wrestling to win four straight titles in the big schools division (2004–2007). The team won eighty-four consecutive dual meet events from 2004 to 2008.

The Oviedo Lions have an in-town rivalry with Hagerty High School. The Lions also have a rivalry with Lake Howell High School since the latter was founded in 1975, as well as with Winter Springs and Lake Brantley high schools.

In May 2011, Oviedo High School was fined $57,000 (the fine was originally $280,000, but was reduced because of their cooperation with the FHSAA) and the school's head volleyball coach and entire wrestling staff were fired after the volleyball and wrestling teams had players who lived outside the district, violating eligibility requirements. The violations involved at least one volleyball player and five wrestlers and include falsifying addresses, athletes transferring to Oviedo and living with assistant coaches in order to circumvent location mandates, and recruiting through a club program run by the volleyball coach. The FHSAA also banned the wrestling team from regional, district, and state competition for three years. The volleyball team was put on probation for two years. The athletic director and assistant athletic director lost their jobs. The fines come out of the athletic fund instead of taxpayer resources. The volleyball and wrestling teams were forced to forfeit all their wins from the 2010–2011 season. The wrestling team was also placed on probation for four years. The fines and sanctions are the harshest in Florida history. In June 2012, the FHSAA removed the remaining two years of Oviedo's postseason ban in wrestling, allowing team members to compete for regional and state honors, while keeping the school on probation for two years. The coaches involved and illegally enrolled students were no longer at the school. In November 2019, football coach Matt Dixion was forced to resign after an investigation into 'code reds'.

== Notable alumni ==
- Mark Bellhorn, starting second baseman for the Boston Red Sox, 2004 World Series championship season
- Blake Bortles, NFL player, Jacksonville Jaguars
- A. J. Cole, MLB, Nippon Professional Baseball, player
- Abigail Cowen, actress, Stranger Things
- Alwyn Cashe, United States Army soldier, received the Medal of Honor for actions in the Iraq War
- Trinity Fatu, wrestler under the ring name Naomi, two-time WWE SmackDown Women's Champion
- Dara Huang, award-winning architect
- Hal King, Major League Baseball, Cincinnati Reds, catcher
- Ronnie Murphy, basketball player, NBA, Portland Trail Blazers
- Tom Rhodes, comedian, Comedy Central
- Jennifer Simpson, runner, Olympic and world championships medalist
- Monty Sopp, wrestler under the ring names "Billy Gunn" and "The Outlaw"; Class of 2019 WWE Hall of Famer – inducted as a member of D-Generation X
