= Joseph N. Crooms =

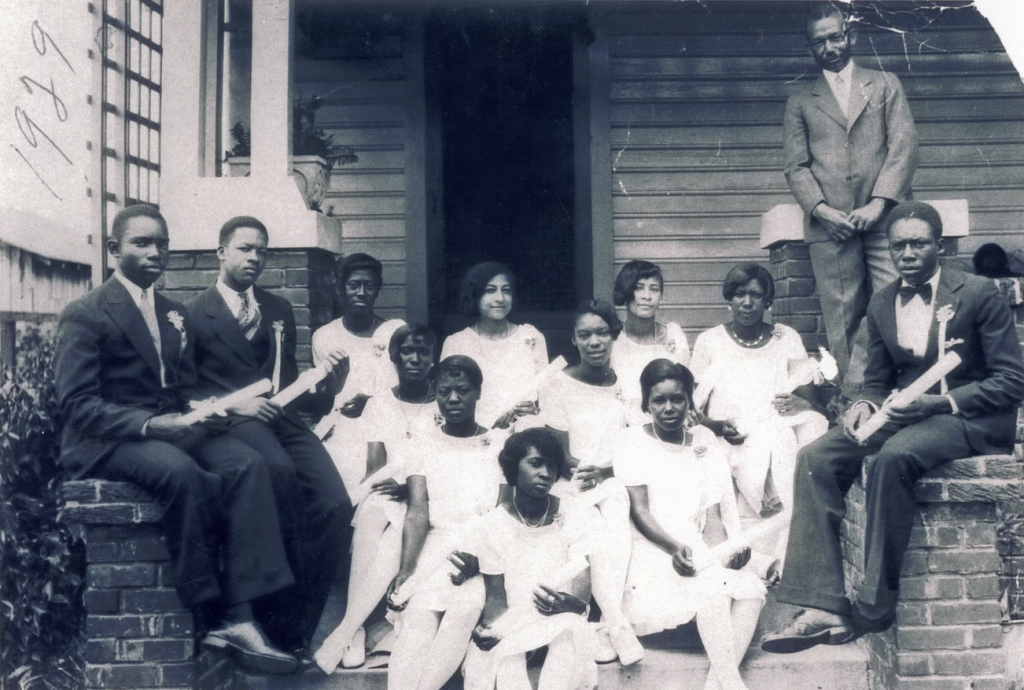
- J.N. Crooms posing with the Crooms Academy Class of 1929, on the front steps of his home at 812 South Sanford Ave.
- Born: June 17, 1880 Orlando, Florida
- Died: March 14, 1957 (77 years old) Sanford, Florida
- Occupation: Founder and Principle of Crooms Academy, Educator
- Spouse: Wealthy Mabel (Richardson) Crooms
- Children: Nathalie (Crooms) Jenkins

Joseph Nathaniel Crooms, also known as J. N. Crooms, (June 17, 1880 - March 14, 1957) was an African American principal and educator in Florida. He established two schools for African American students in Seminole County, the first being Hopper Academy and the second being Crooms Academy in Goldsboro (now part of Sanford), Florida, in 1926. Crooms Academy was the first four-year high school for African Americans in Seminole County, Florida.

== Early life and education ==
Joseph Crooms was the fifth child born to parents Moses and Daphne Crooms in Orlando, Florida, in 1880. Both were freed slaves from the Tallahassee area. Moses was most likely born on the Goodwood Plantation and excelled in carpentry. Daphne was well educated since she was a girl, and emphasized the importance of education to all of her children and grandchildren. Census records show Moses and Daphne living in Monticello for several years, before they moved their family down to Orlando. Moses had worked with a railroad company, and saved up enough money to buy several plots of land of the west side of Orlando in the black community of Jonestown. The Crooms family would become well known in the black community of Central Florida. Many of the Crooms children would succeed in the education field and ministries.

In 1906, Joseph and his wife Wealthy Richardson Crooms moved to Sanford, Florida. Joseph had taken a job as the principal of Hopper Academy, and under his guidance he helped build the school house that still stands today.

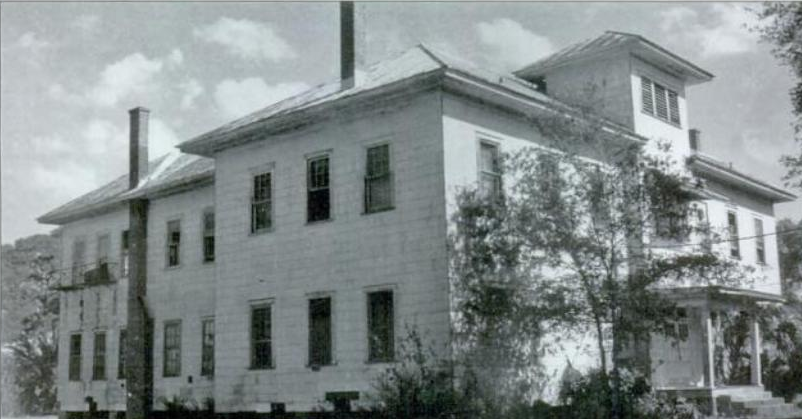
Hopper Academy in the historical black community of Georgetown in Sanford, Florida

== Sanford Legacy and Crooms Academy ==
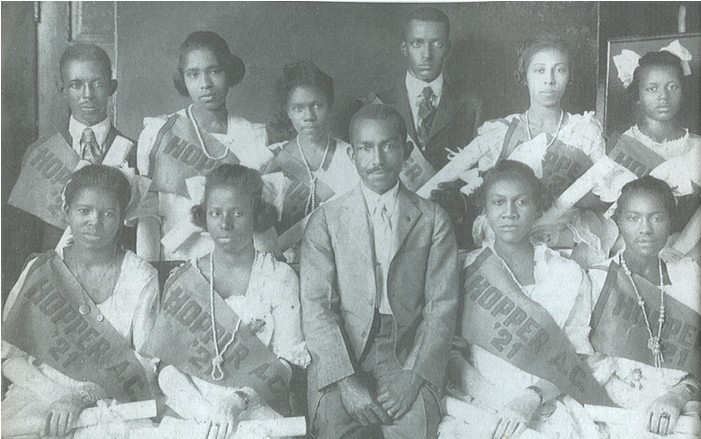
Joseph N. Crooms with the Hopper Academy graduating class of 1921

Hopper Academy, located at 1101 South Pine Avenue, was built in 1906. At this time, it served as the only school for African-American children in what was then Orange County. Structured after Booker T. Washington's Tuskegee Institute, the curriculum was trade and agriculturally based, and classes only went up to the 10th grade. The academic terms reflected the scheduling of the harvest months, allowing the children to still help their parents in the fields. The schools were designed to teach the students basic skills that they could to take back to their rural black communities, and continue to prosper with their learned skills.

Joseph Crooms saw the opportunity to expand the curriculum of Hopper Academy and include a wider range of academic subjects, such as arts and sciences. Joseph and Wealthy Crooms donated 17.5 acres (7.1 ha) of land in Goldsboro and began building their new school. It would become Crooms Academy, a four-year high school dedicated to the enrichment and empowerment of young black lives. The school used a quarter academic term.

Crooms Academy opened in 1926, and Hopper Academy became the elementary-middle school, with levels ranging from kindergarten to eighth grade. Crooms Academy and its founders, Joseph and Wealthy, were pioneers in the education of African American students. Crooms Academy allowed students access to visual, performing, and musical arts and sciences.

== Personal life ==
Joseph and Wealthy were active members in their community. They were known to take in boarders and give them jobs in their school as teachers, librarians or staff. They also took in children who needed somewhere to live. One was Clifford Joel Hurston, the younger brother of the Harlem Renaissance writer Zora Neale Hurston. After their mother died in 1904, the Hurston children were sent to live with family and friends. Clifford Joel would become their unofficial adopted son. In 1920, the Crooms built their home on 812 South Sanford Ave in the neighborhood of Georgetown. It was one of the many buildings designed by a local African American architect named Prince W. Spears. It became a tradition for alumni of Hopper and Crooms Academy to take their graduation class portraits with Joseph on the brick steps of his house. Crooms Academy would also perform yearly parades down South Sanford Avenue, with baton twirlers and marching bands.

Joseph was a talented piano player, and taught choir at the Academy, in addition to giving piano lessons out of his home. He was known to be strict and would smack the knuckles of his students with a ruler if they missed a note.

Joseph was good friends with Mary McLeod Bethune. Together with other black investors, they founded the Bethune Beach Corporation, purchased beach property, and built one of the few motels, "Welricha" motel, named after Joseph's wife Wealthy on the Atlantic Ocean that catered to people of color.

Joseph had one daughter, Nathalie Crooms Jenkins, born October 2, 1912, and after his death, Nathalie adopted 2 sons, Stephen Jenkins and Nathaniel Jenkins, who was killed in Beirut Lebanon in 1983, as part of the United Nations peacekeeping forces.

== Death ==
On March 15, 1957, Joseph Crooms died from a heart attack.
