= Winter Springs High School =

Coordinates: 28°42′13″N 81°15′56″W

- 130 Tuskawilla Road; Winter Springs, Florida; Winter Springs, Seminole County, Florida

Information
- School type: Public
- Established: 1997
- School district: Seminole County Public Schools
- Principal: Peter Gaffney
- Faculty: 99.56 (FTE)
- Grades: 9-12
- Enrollment: 2,038 (2022-23)
- Student to teacher ratio: 20.47
- Colors: Purple and Vegas gold
- Athletics conference: FHSAA
- Mascot: Bears
- Newspaper: The Bear Truth News http://beartruthnews.com/
- Website: www.winterspringshs.scps.k12.fl.us

Winter Springs High School, is a high school in Winter Springs, Florida. It was founded in 1997 as the seventh full-time high school in Seminole County. The school is operated by Seminole County Public Schools.

== History ==
Winter Springs High School opened in 1997 as the latest high school of Seminole County. Plans for the new school began three years earlier as a result of overcrowding at Oviedo, Lake Howell and Lyman high schools. The community of Winter Springs successfully lobbied to have the school built in their town as a way of creating a "town identity and center, and not just be an outgrowth of the surrounding cities."

Although, the school first opened in 1997 as Winter Springs High School, the school had first opened its doors as a temporary home to the student body, faculty and staff of nearby Lake Howell High School the previous year while the Lake Howell campus underwent major renovations.

A.W. Epps was the school's first principal. When the school opened in 1997, it housed only 9th and 10th grade students. The school housed grades 9–11 in 1998–1999, and the first class graduated in 1999–2000. Dr. Elise Gruber became principal in 2000 and was succeeded by Dr. Michael R. Blasewitz in 2004. In 2012 Dr. Blasewitz was named Director of High Schools of Seminole County Public Schools. As a result, Dr. Mickey Reynolds was named the fourth principal of Winter Springs High School the same year. Pete Gaffney became the principal starting in the 2017–2018 school year. The school's bell schedule has been adjusted to a modified block format, to accommodate student needs.

== Sports ==
Winter Springs High School sponsors many interscholastic sports teams including football, cross country, volleyball, golf, bowling, track and field, lacrosse, wrestling, swimming, water polo, bowling, baseball, basketball, soccer, weightlifting, cheerleading, softball and tennis. The Winter Springs teams compete at the A.W. Epps Sports Complex, named after the high school's first principal.

The Girls' Basketball team won state championships back-to-back in 1999 and 2000.

The Girls Cross Country team won the State title in 2019 and 2020.

The volleyball team captured the 2015 FHSAA State Championship.

The Softball team went 31–0 topping the #1 team 3-0 in 2019 capturing the FHSAA State Title, and was named National Champions in Extra Inning Softball's Extra Elite Eighty high school rankings.

In 2023, the Girls Weightlifting team won the 3A State Championships.

== Band ==
In April 2011, the Band of Gold was invited to perform at Stetson University's prestigious band invitational, performing a repertoire that included the finale of Symphony No. 3 (Saint-Saëns). The Band of Gold traveled to Washington, D.C. in January 2009 for the inauguration of President Obama, as well as performing at the President's Park in Williamsburg, Virginia. The band recently went to the University of South Florida to participate in the 2012 Florida Bandmaster's Association State Music Performance Assessment, performing a program of March Grandioso, Armand Russell's Theme and Fantasia, and the Overture to Tannhauser. The band received straight superior ratings.

At the beginning of the 2015–2016 school year the Lord Mayor of London England asked the band program to perform at the London New Year's Day parade. "It will be lit" said Adam McIntyre, the band director for the school

== Chorus ==
The Winter Springs High School Chorus program includes the Combined Women's (which includes the beginner, intermediate, and advanced women), Men's, Mixed Concert (which includes the men and advanced women), and Advanced Women's choirs.

== National prominence ==
In 2004, Winter Springs High School gained national attention for its excellent Safe-School Ambassador program and was featured in a segment on MSNBC. In 2005, Winter Springs High School gained national attention yet again when several Winter Springs students, riding in a limousine to prom, stopped a drunk driver and called the police. This story gained national headlines, and the students were featured on several national talk shows as well as NBC, CBS, and ABC. In 2005, the school was recognized as having the second largest number of National Merit semifinalists (19) in the state of Florida. The story was featured on the front page of the Orlando Sentinel.

== Notable people ==
- Caskey, rapper
- Ocky Clark, track and field Olympian coaches at Winter Springs.
- Zechariah Cartledge, Founder of Running 4 Heroes, NASCAR Regional driver, and track announcer.
