= Tony Jones (linebacker) =

American gridiron football player (born 1995)

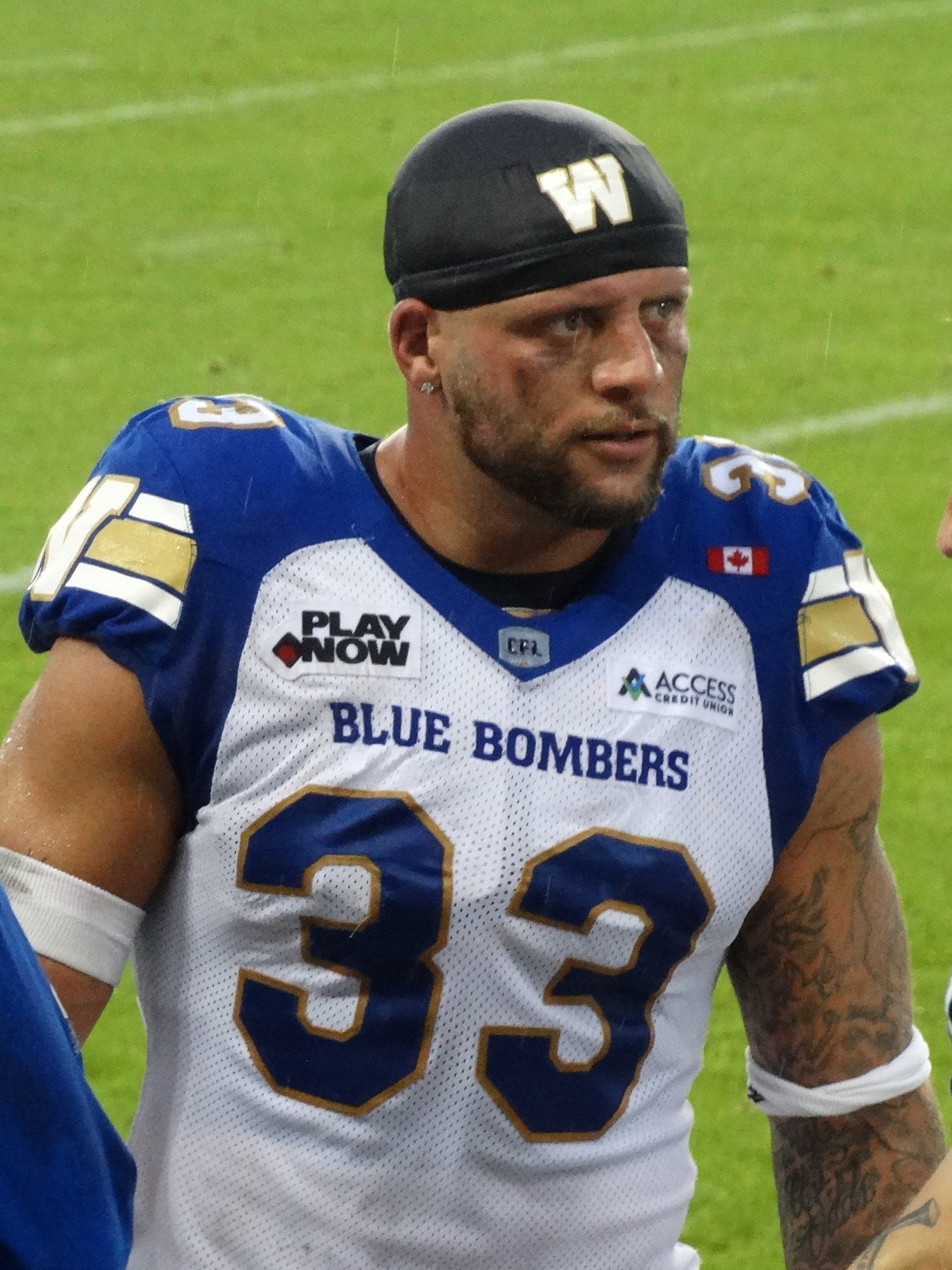
- Jones with the Winnipeg Blue Bombers in 2025

No. 33 – Winnipeg Blue Bombers
- Position: Linebacker
- Roster status: Active
- CFL status: American

Personal information
- Born: August 5, 1995 (age 31); Casselberry, Florida, U.S.
- Listed height: 6 ft 1 in (1.85 m)
- Listed weight: 233 lb (106 kg)

Career information
- High school: Lyman (Longwood, FL)
- College: Butler Community College; Texas Tech

Career history
- 2021: Iowa Barnstormers
- 2022: Toronto Argonauts*
- 2022–2023: Edmonton Elks
- 2024–present: Winnipeg Blue Bombers
- * Offseason or practice squad member only

Awards and highlights
- CFL West All-Star (2025); First-team All-IFL (2021)
- Stats at CFL.ca

Tony Jones (born August 5, 1995) is an American professional football linebacker for the Winnipeg Blue Bombers of the Canadian Football League (CFL). He played college football at Butler Community College and Texas Tech. He has also been a member of the Toronto Argonauts and Edmonton Elks of the CFL, and the Iowa Barnstormers of the Indoor Football League (IFL).

== Early life ==
Jones played high school football at Lyman High School in Longwood, Florida as a running back.

== College career ==
Jones played college football at Butler Community College from 2015 to 2016 as a linebacker. He played in 11 games in 2015, recording 75 tackles, seven sacks, three forced fumbles and four fumble recoveries. He appeared in 11 in 2016, totaling 101 tackles, 5.5 sacks, seven forced fumbles and six fumble recoveries.

Jones transferred to play at Texas Tech from 2017 to 2018. He played in 12 games, starting three, in 2017, accumulating 32 tackles, four sacks and one interception. He appeared in 11 games, starting two, in 2018, recording 44 tackles and four sacks.

== Professional career ==
Pre-draft measurables
Height	Weight	Arm length	Hand span	Wingspan	40-yard dash	10-yard split	20-yard split	20-yard shuttle	Three-cone drill	Vertical jump	Broad jump	Bench press
6 ft 1 in (1.85 m)	232 lb (105 kg)	32 1/8 in (0.82 m)	9 1/4 in (0.23 m)	6 ft 3 in (1.91 m)	4.72 s	1.60 s	2.74 s	4.15 s	7.04 s	35.0 in (0.89 m)	10 ft 0 in (3.05 m)	23 reps
All values from Pro Day

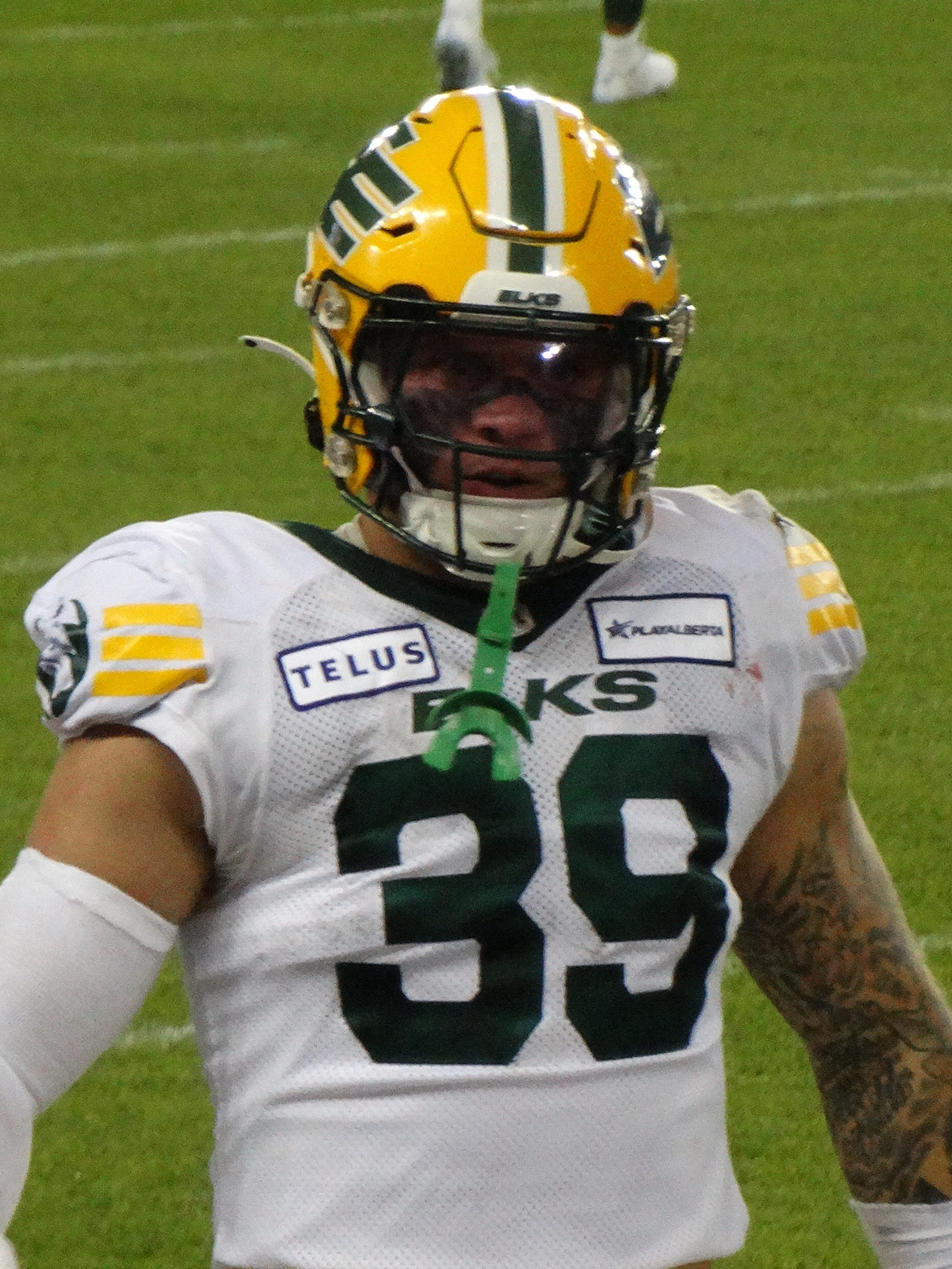
Jones with the Edmonton Elks in 2023

=== Iowa Barnstormers ===
Jones played for the Iowa Barnstormers of the Indoor Football League (IFL) in 2021, earning first-team All-IFL, All-Rookie Team, and Defensive Rookie of the Year honors.

=== Toronto Argonauts ===
Jones signed with the Toronto Argonauts of the Canadian Football League (CFL) on December 13, 2021. He was moved to the practice roster on June 5, 2022 and released on July 2, 2022.

=== Edmonton Elks ===
Jones was signed to the practice roster of the Edmonton Elks of the CFL on September 12, 2022 and promoted to the active roster on October 11, 2022. Overall, he dressed in four games in 2022, accumulating two tackles on defense and two special teams tackles.

Jones dressed for 18 games, starting four, in 2023, recording 41 tackles on defense, 11 special teams tackles, one sack and one forced fumble. He re-signed with the team on February 2, 2024. However, he was part of the final training camp cuts on June 1, 2024.

=== Winnipeg Blue Bombers ===
On June 9, 2024, it was announced that Jones had signed with the CFL's Winnipeg Blue Bombers. After being placed on the practice roster, he played in 12 regular season games, starting in 11, where he had 49 defensive tackles, 11 special teams tackles, one sack, one interception, six pass knockdowns, one forced fumble, and one fumble recovery. He played in the 111th Grey Cup where he recorded four defensive tackles in the Blue Bombers' loss to the Toronto Argonauts.
