= Sanford, Florida =

City in Florida, United States

- City
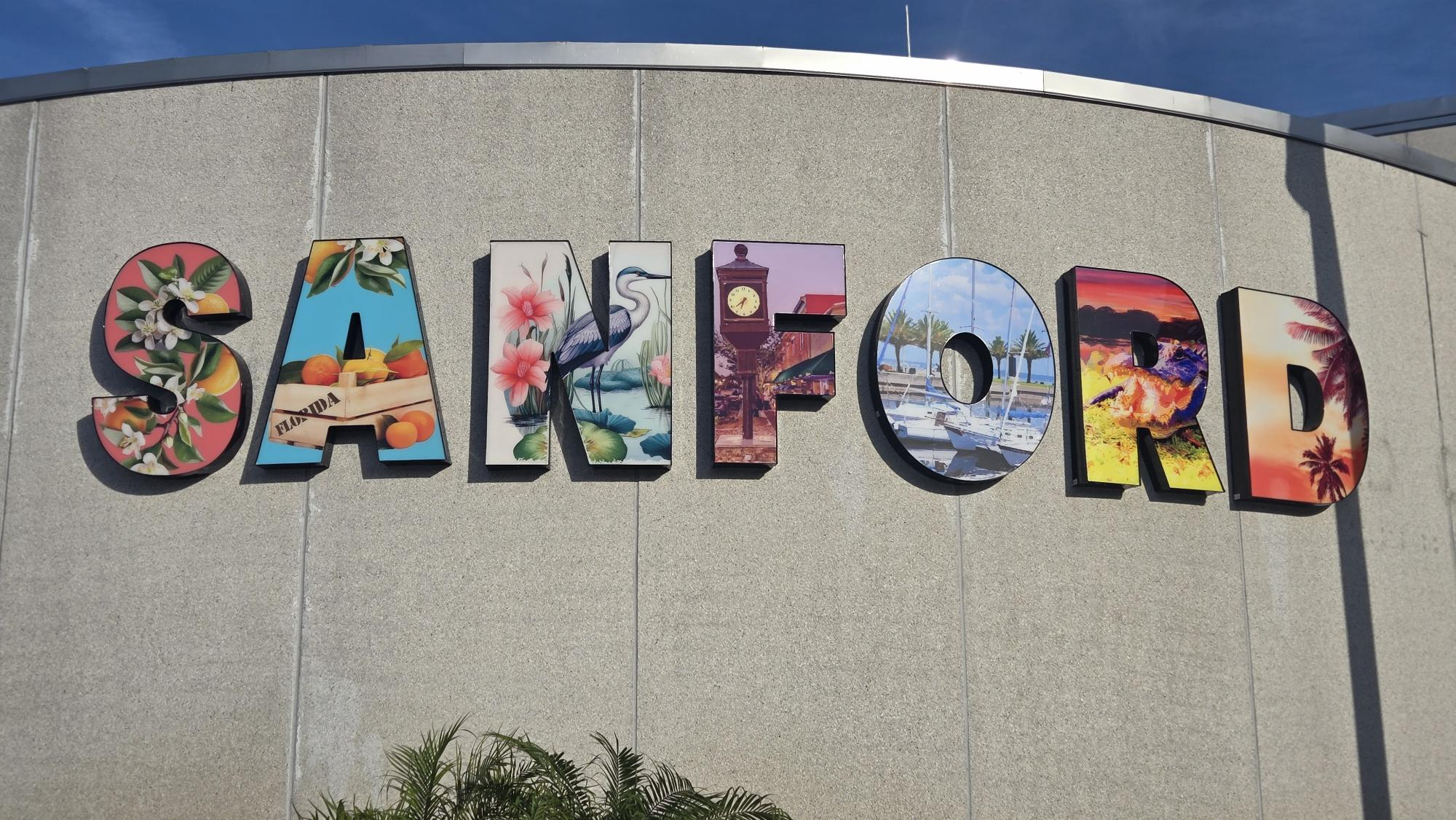
- Sanford City Hall

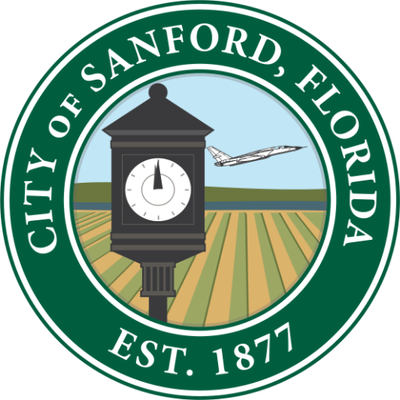
- Seal Wordmark
- Nickname: "Celery City"
- Location in Seminole County and the U.S. state of Florida

- Location in the United States
- Coordinates: 28°46′10″N 81°16′33″W
- Country: United States
- State: Florida
- County: Seminole
- Incorporated: September 29, 1877
- Founder: Henry Shelton Sanford

Government
  - Type: Commission–Manager

Area
  - City: 27.18 sq mi (70.39 km^{2})
  - Land: 23.58 sq mi (61.07 km^{2})
  - Water: 3.60 sq mi (9.32 km^{2})
- Elevation: 39 ft (12 m)

Population (2020)
  - City: 61,051
  - Estimate (2024): 66,919 ▲
  - Density: 2,589.2/sq mi (999.68/km^{2})
  - Urban: 1,510,516 (32nd U.S.)
  - Metro: 2,267,846 (26th U.S.)
- Time zone: UTC-05:00 (EST)
  - Summer (DST): UTC-04:00 (EDT)
- ZIP codes: 32771, 32773
- Area codes: 321, 407, 689
- FIPS code: 12-63650
- GNIS feature ID: 2405418
- Website: sanfordfl.gov

Sanford is a city in and the county seat of Seminole County, Florida, United States. It is located in Central Florida and its population was 61,051 as of the 2020 census. It is part of the Orlando–Kissimmee–Sanford Metropolitan Statistical Area.

Known as the "Historic Waterfront Gateway City", Sanford sits on the southern shore of Lake Monroe at the head of navigation on the St. Johns River. Native Americans first settled the area thousands of years before the city was formed. The Seminoles arrived in the area in the 18th century. During the Second Seminole War in 1836, the United States Army established Camp Monroe and built a road now known as Mellonville Avenue. Sanford is about 20 miles (32 km) northeast of Orlando.

Sanford is home to Seminole State College of Florida and the Central Florida Zoo and Botanical Gardens. Its downtown attracts tourists with shops, restaurants, a marina, and a lakefront walking trail called the Sanford Riverwalk. The Orlando Sanford International Airport, in the heart of the town, functions as the secondary commercial airport for international and domestic carriers in the Orlando metropolitan area.

== History ==
=== Early history ===
The Mayaca or Jororo Indians inhabited the shores of Lake Monroe at the time of European contact. By 1760, war and disease had decimated the tribe, which would be replaced by the Seminole. Florida was acquired by the United States from Spain in 1821, but the Seminole Wars would delay settlement.

In 1835, during the Second Seminole War the port of Palatka on the St. Johns River, then the major artery into Central Florida from the East Coast, was burned. Consequently, a U.S. Army garrison was established upstream, on the southern side of Lake Monroe near a trading post. Established as Camp Monroe in 1836, the site was enclosed by log breastwork on three sides but open to the river, with approximately 300 men based there. The camp was attacked by allied Seminoles on February 8, 1837. It would be strengthened and renamed Fort Mellon in honor of Captain Charles Mellon, the sole American casualty of the attack. During the war, General Zachary Taylor had a road built connecting a string of military defenses from Lake Monroe to Fort Brooke (now Tampa).

The town of Mellonville was founded around Fort Mellon in 1842 by Daniel Stewart. In 1845, Florida became a U.S. state. That same year, Mosquito County was renamed Orange County and the county seat was moved from Enterprise to Mellonville. Orange groves were planted, with the first fruit packing plant built in 1869.

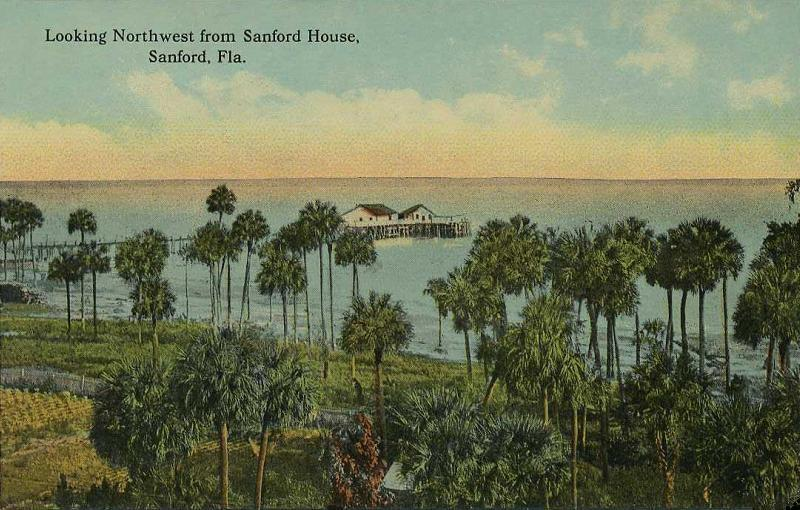
Lake Monroe, circa 1912

=== Early years as Sanford ===
In 1870, Henry Shelton Sanford bought 12,548 acres (50.78 km^{2}) to the west of Mellonville and laid out the community of Sanford. Believing it would become a transportation hub, he called it "The Gateway City to South Florida." Sanford imported two colonies of Swedes (totaling about 150 adults) as indentured servants to labor a year for their travel expenses. The Swedes would do the back-breaking work of establishing a new town and clearing the sub-tropical wilderness in advance of creating a citrus empire, arriving by steamboat in 1871.

Incorporated in 1877 with a population of 100, Sanford absorbed Mellonville in 1883. In April of that year, President Chester A. Arthur arrived by steamer to vacation for a week at the Sanford House, a lakeside hotel built in 1875 and expanded in 1882.

Meanwhile, Sanford was becoming a hub of rail transportation. The South Florida Railroad opened a narrow-gauge route from Sanford to Orlando in 1880, and eventually built a connection to the Port of Tampa by the end of 1883. The standard-gauge Jacksonville, Tampa and Key West Railroad opened a route from Sanford to Jacksonville in 1886, completing a rail link across the peninsula. The Orange Belt Railway, another narrow-gauge line, was established in 1885 and reached St. Petersburg in 1888. (All three of these railroads would become part of the Plant System in the 1890s, and the narrow-gauge lines were standardized.) Easy access to transportation soon made the area the largest shipper of oranges in the world.

In 1887, the city suffered a devastating fire, followed the next year by a statewide epidemic of yellow fever. When the Great Freeze of 1894 and 1895 ruined the citrus industry, farmers diversified by growing vegetables as well. Celery was first planted in 1896, and because of this Sanford is nicknamed the "Celery City."

On December 1, 1891, merchant William Clark and registered African American voters of Goldsboro incorporated as a town just to the southwest of Sanford.

In 1878, Mrs. Henry Sanford created the first library for public use in Sanford. A room was provided with a few books and a paid librarian. The initial library failed. In 1889, Mrs. Thrasher and Mrs. A.M. Deforest attempted to revive the library project with the aid of the Wednesday Club, the president, Mrs. Brown encouraged the women to begin fundraising efforts. The effort's fundraising progress was slow and sporadic. A Subscription library was established in a storefront on First Street. Mrs. Duver was the librarian at this location. The library later moved to Magnolia Avenue next to the theatre at this location the library was run by volunteers. The library grew at this location, until it moved in 1914 to the Women's Club on Oak Avenue. An official Public Library was built and opened in 1924 on 5th Street. This library was supported by the City of Sanford.

=== 20th century ===
In 1911, the community of Sanford Heights seceded from Sanford, because of discord over municipal services provided by Sanford. This added to concerns that Sanford's ability to expand would be constrained by the surrounding towns of Goldsboro, Georgetown and Sanford Heights, as well as Lake Monroe to the west. Florida State Representative and former Sanford mayor Forrest Lake led legislative efforts to curtail Sanford Heights' ability to incorporate as an independent entity. Goldsboro was also a target in Forrest Lake's annexation process, prompting Goldsboro's leaders to start a letter writing campaign to local newspapers. On April 6, 1911, the Sanford city council passed a resolution to annex Goldsboro and on April 26, 1911, the Florida legislature passed the Sanford Charter Bill, dissolving the incorporation of both Sanford and Goldsboro, and reorganizing Sanford as a city that included Goldsboro within its boundaries.

In 1913, Sanford became the county seat of Seminole County, created from Orange County. Agriculture continued to dominate the economy until 1940, when it proved cheaper to cultivate produce in frost-free South Florida.

==== Naval aviation ====
In 1942, Naval Air Station Sanford was established, which conducted operational training in the Lockheed PV-1 Ventura, Lockheed PBO Hudson, Grumman F4F/General Motors FM-1 Wildcat and the Grumman F6F Hellcat. At its peak in 1943–45, NAS Sanford was home to approximately 360 officers, 1500 enlisted men and 150 WAVES and included an auxiliary airfield to the east near Lake Harney known as Outlying Field Osceola. The base was inactivated and reduced to caretaker status in 1946, but was reactivated in 1950 in response to the Korean War and the Cold War. A major construction program ensued, with NAS Sanford redeveloped as a Master Jet Base for carrier-based Douglas A-3 Skywarrior and later North American A-5A and RA-5C Vigilante aircraft. At its peak in the mid-1960s, the base was home to nearly 4000 military personnel, comprising the air station personnel complement, an Aircraft Intermediate Maintenance Department, the Navy Dispensary, the Marine Barracks, a Replacement Air Group/Fleet Replacement Squadron for the RA-5C, and nine deployable Fleet RA-5C squadrons that routinely deployed aboard large aircraft carriers to the Mediterranean and the Pacific. The latter were heavily engaged in combat operations during the Vietnam War.

As a result of the increasing costs of the Vietnam War and concurrent federal domestic spending related to President Lyndon Johnson's Great Society social programs, NAS Sanford was one of several stateside military installations identified for closure by the Department of Defense in 1967. Flight operations were rapidly scaled down during 1968 as the squadrons of Reconnaissance Attack Wing ONE transferred to the former Turner AFB, renamed Naval Air Station Albany, Georgia. This resulted in a significant economic downturn for the City of Sanford and Seminole County with the departure of all military personnel and their families. The airfield was conveyed to the City of Sanford via quitclaim deed by the General Services Administration (GSA) in 1969, renamed Sanford Airport and redeveloped as a general aviation facility. Subsequently renamed Sanford Regional Airport, then Central Florida Regional Airport, the airport commenced commercial airline service in 1995 and was renamed Orlando Sanford International Airport the following year. The Navy's presence is commemorated at the airport by two historical markers and the NAS Sanford Memorial Park, which was dedicated on Memorial Day in May 2003 and includes a restored RA-5C Vigilante on loan from the National Naval Aviation Museum that was placed on permanent static display at the entrance to the commercial airline terminal.

==== Tourism ====
The opening of Walt Disney World Resort in October 1971 shifted the economy of Central Florida away from agriculture, military installations, defense/aerospace industries, and the NASA crewed and uncrewed space programs, and further towards tourism, service industries and residential development, the center of which is Orlando. But because of Sanford's former preeminence as a trade center, the city retains a significant collection of older commercial and residential architecture, on streets shaded by live oaks hung with Spanish moss. Its location on Lake Monroe and access to the navigable waterway of the St. Johns River has made it Central Florida's additional center for numerous marinas, allowing access for pleasure boats and commercial vessels to and from the Atlantic Ocean and the Intracoastal Waterway via Jacksonville and Mayport to the north.

==== Jackie Robinson ====
Sanford Field, built in 1926, was the location where Jackie Robinson first took the field to play as a member of a racially-integrated baseball team. Robinson arrived at Daytona Beach, Florida in early 1946 for spring training with the Montreal Royals of the Class AAA International League, a minor league affiliate of the Brooklyn Dodgers. Since the Dodgers organization did not own a spring training facility, training took place at several local baseball stadiums, including Sanford Field.

Robinson's presence on the team was controversial in racially charged Florida. He was not allowed to stay with his white teammates at the team hotel, and many other local towns prevented the team from playing while he was part of the roster. The police chief in Sanford had threatened to cancel the game there if Robinson was to play. Robinson joined his team despite the threat, but the uproar from the mainly white audience in the stands caused him to be escorted off the field and he was not able to play.

Historic Sanford Memorial Stadium was built in 1951 near the site of the old Sanford Field as the Spring Training Facility of the New York Giants. The ballpark is located just south of Lake Monroe on Mellonville Avenue, less than a mile from Historic Downtown Sanford. Other Major League stars have played in the Sanford stadiums, including Babe Ruth, Willie Mays, Tim Raines, and David Eckstein.

=== 21st century ===
Sanford received national attention in 2012 following the killing of Trayvon Martin and the response of the Sanford Police Department.

A city streetscaping project began in 2004 as city leaders sought to attract new businesses and visitors to downtown. By 2016, downtown Sanford was becoming known as a center for craft beer production in Central Florida, with two microbreweries, a home brewing supplier, and at least five other pubs focused on craft beers.

== Geography ==
According to the United States Census Bureau, the city has a total area of 26.5 square miles (68.63 km^{2}), 22.96 square miles (59.47 km^{2}) of which is land and 3.54 square miles (9.17 km^{2}) of which is water. Sanford is bordered by Lake Mary to the southwest and to the north by Lake Monroe and DeBary.

=== Climate ===
Like the rest of Central Florida, Sanford experiences a warm humid subtropical climate with dry warm winters and wet hot summers. The dry season lasts from October to May, while the wet season is from June to September.

Climate data for Sanford, Florida (Orlando Sanford International Airport), 1991–2020 normals, extremes 1948–present
Month	Jan	Feb	Mar	Apr	May	Jun	Jul	Aug	Sep	Oct	Nov	Dec	Year
Record high °F (°C)	89 (32)	89 (32)	94 (34)	97 (36)	100 (38)	102 (39)	103 (39)	100 (38)	97 (36)	95 (35)	92 (33)	89 (32)	103 (39)
Mean maximum °F (°C)	83.2 (28.4)	85.3 (29.6)	88.3 (31.3)	91.4 (33.0)	95.3 (35.2)	96.8 (36.0)	96.8 (36.0)	96.7 (35.9)	94.4 (34.7)	91.0 (32.8)	87.1 (30.6)	83.9 (28.8)	98.2 (36.8)
Mean daily maximum °F (°C)	71.3 (21.8)	74.2 (23.4)	78.3 (25.7)	83.4 (28.6)	88.5 (31.4)	91.0 (32.8)	92.7 (33.7)	92.5 (33.6)	89.7 (32.1)	84.6 (29.2)	78.2 (25.7)	73.4 (23.0)	83.1 (28.4)
Daily mean °F (°C)	60.4 (15.8)	63.1 (17.3)	67.1 (19.5)	72.3 (22.4)	77.7 (25.4)	81.9 (27.7)	83.6 (28.7)	83.6 (28.7)	81.4 (27.4)	75.5 (24.2)	68.2 (20.1)	63.1 (17.3)	73.2 (22.9)
Mean daily minimum °F (°C)	49.6 (9.8)	52.1 (11.2)	55.9 (13.3)	61.2 (16.2)	67.0 (19.4)	72.7 (22.6)	74.4 (23.6)	74.6 (23.7)	73.1 (22.8)	66.5 (19.2)	58.2 (14.6)	52.7 (11.5)	63.2 (17.3)
Mean minimum °F (°C)	32.4 (0.2)	35.6 (2.0)	40.2 (4.6)	47.6 (8.7)	56.6 (13.7)	66.7 (19.3)	70.1 (21.2)	70.5 (21.4)	67.2 (19.6)	52.8 (11.6)	43.4 (6.3)	36.4 (2.4)	30.2 (−1.0)
Record low °F (°C)	19 (−7)	23 (−5)	27 (−3)	36 (2)	45 (7)	52 (11)	60 (16)	64 (18)	52 (11)	39 (4)	27 (−3)	19 (−7)	19 (−7)
Average precipitation inches (mm)	2.36 (60)	2.25 (57)	2.85 (72)	2.35 (60)	3.31 (84)	8.19 (208)	7.29 (185)	6.77 (172)	6.24 (158)	3.90 (99)	1.88 (48)	2.24 (57)	49.63 (1,261)
Average precipitation days (≥ 0.01 in)	8.1	8.0	7.9	7.1	8.3	17.0	16.7	17.2	15.7	9.9	8.4	8.3	132.6
Source: NOAA

== Demographics ==
Historical population
Census	Pop.	Note	%±
1890	2,016		—
1900	1,450		−28.1%
1910	3,570		146.2%
1920	5,588		56.5%
1930	10,100		80.7%
1940	10,217		1.2%
1950	11,935		16.8%
1960	19,175		60.7%
1970	17,393		−9.3%
1980	23,176		33.2%
1990	32,387		39.7%
2000	38,291		18.2%
2010	53,570		39.9%
2020	61,051		14.0%
2025 (est.)	67,483	▲	10.5%
U.S. Decennial Census

=== Racial and ethnic composition ===
Sanford city, Florida – Racial and ethnic composition Note: the US Census treats Hispanic/Latino as an ethnic category. This table excludes Latinos from the racial categories and assigns them to a separate category. Hispanics/Latinos may be of any race.
Race / Ethnicity (NH = Non-Hispanic)	Pop 2000	Pop 2010	Pop 2020	% 2000	% 2010	% 2020
White alone (NH)	20,911	24,096	22,437	54.61%	44.98%	36.75%
Black or African American alone (NH)	12,167	15,660	15,495	31.78%	29.23%	25.38%
Native American or Alaska Native alone (NH)	131	204	138	0.34%	0.38%	0.23%
Asian alone (NH)	396	1,473	3,031	1.03%	2.75%	4.96%
Native Hawaiian or Pacific Islander alone (NH)	20	22	33	0.05%	0.04%	0.05%
Other race alone (NH)	79	198	415	0.21%	0.37%	0.68%
Mixed race or Multiracial (NH)	613	1,073	2,672	1.60%	2.00%	4.38%
Hispanic or Latino (any race)	3,974	10,844	16,830	10.38%	20.24%	27.57%
Total	38,291	53,570	61,051	100.00%	100.00%	100.00%

=== 2020 census ===
As of the 2020 census, Sanford had a population of 61,051 and a population density of 2,589.21 people per square mile. The median age was 35.2 years, including 6.4% of residents under age 5, 24.0% under the age of 18, and 12.1% who were 65 years of age or older. For every 100 females there were 92.3 males, and for every 100 females age 18 and over there were 89.5 males age 18 and over. Females made up 49.2% of the population.

99.7% of residents lived in urban areas, while 0.3% lived in rural areas.

There were 23,041 households, of which 34.8% had children under the age of 18 living in them. Of all households, 36.4% were married-couple households, 19.7% had a male householder with no spouse or partner present, and 35.0% had a female householder with no spouse or partner present. About 26.9% of all households were made up of individuals, and 8.5% had someone living alone who was 65 years of age or older. The average household size was 2.66 persons.

There were 25,176 housing units, of which 8.5% were vacant. The homeowner vacancy rate was 1.8%, and the rental vacancy rate was 8.1%.

In 2020, the median value of owner-occupied housing units was $196,100 and the median gross rent was $1,255. 94.7% of households had a computer and 86.9% had a broadband internet subscription.

In 2020, 89.3% of residents 25 years and older were high school graduates or higher, and 25.9% held a bachelor's degree or higher.

Racial composition as of the 2020 census
Race	Number	Percent
White	26,252	43.0%
Black or African American	16,247	26.6%
American Indian and Alaska Native	314	0.5%
Asian	3,117	5.1%
Native Hawaiian and Other Pacific Islander	39	0.1%
Some other race	6,022	9.9%
Two or more races	9,060	14.8%

=== 2010 census ===
As of the 2010 United States census, there were 53,570 people, 18,911 households, and 11,379 families residing in the city.

== Transportation and infrastructure ==
=== Aviation ===
The Orlando Sanford International Airport (SFB) provides some international and commuter airline service for central Florida. Approximately 2.9 million passengers used SFB in 2017.

=== Bicycling ===
The Sanford Riverwalk is a multi-use trail including 26 miles (42 km) around Lake Monroe and a 3.4 miles (5.5 km) connector to the Florida's Coast to Coast connector—linking the west and east coasts of central Florida.

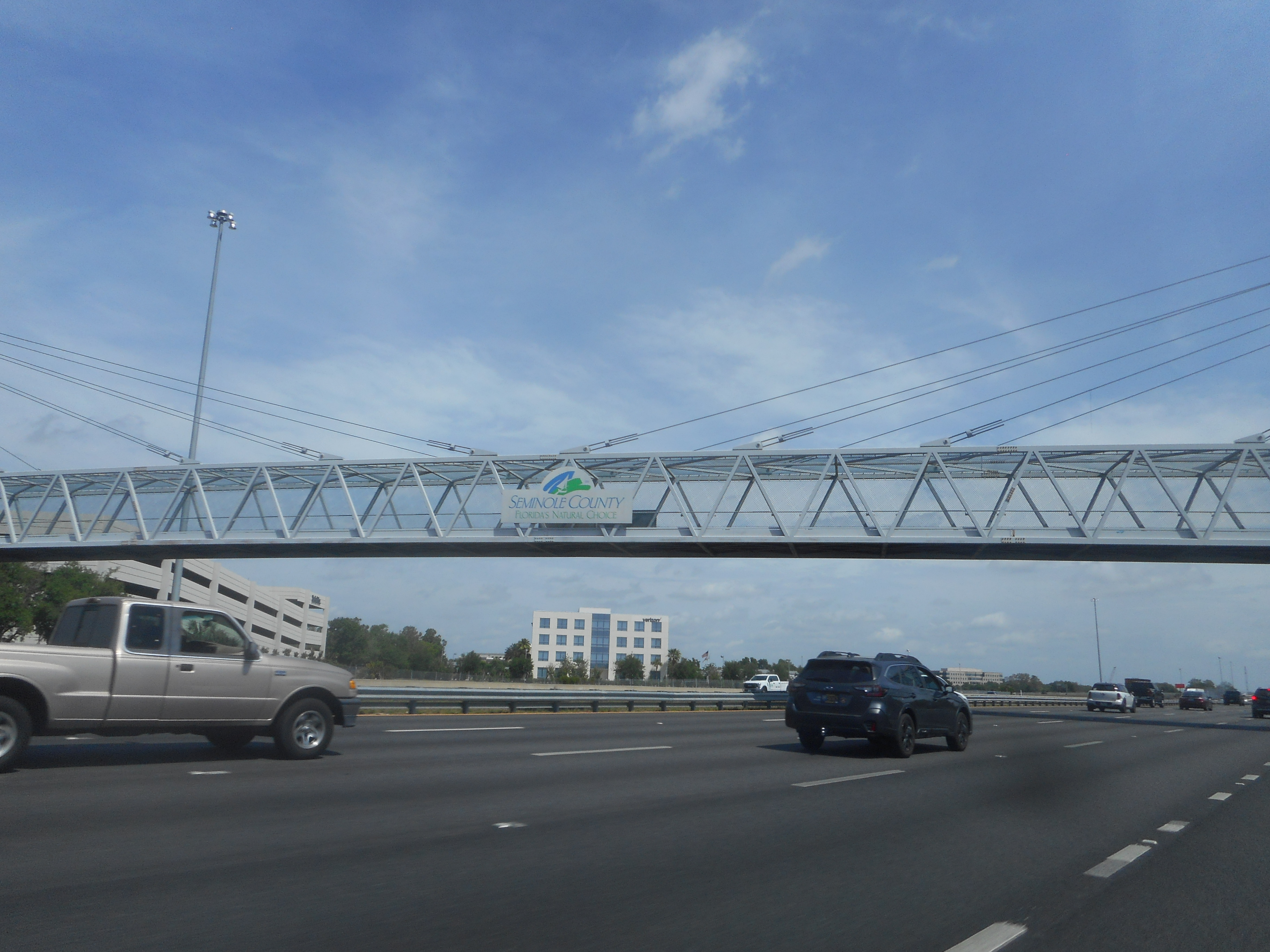
The overpass over I-4 That connects the Cross Seminole Trail to the Seminole Wekiva Trail

=== Bus ===
Historically, Sanford was served by multiple Lynx bus lines, including routes such as, Link 34 (U.S. 17-92/Sanford) Link 45 (Lake Mary), and Link 46E(Downtown Sanford). However, most of these fixed routes in Sanford were eliminated to be replaced by Scout, an on-demand microtransit regional program.

=== Rail ===
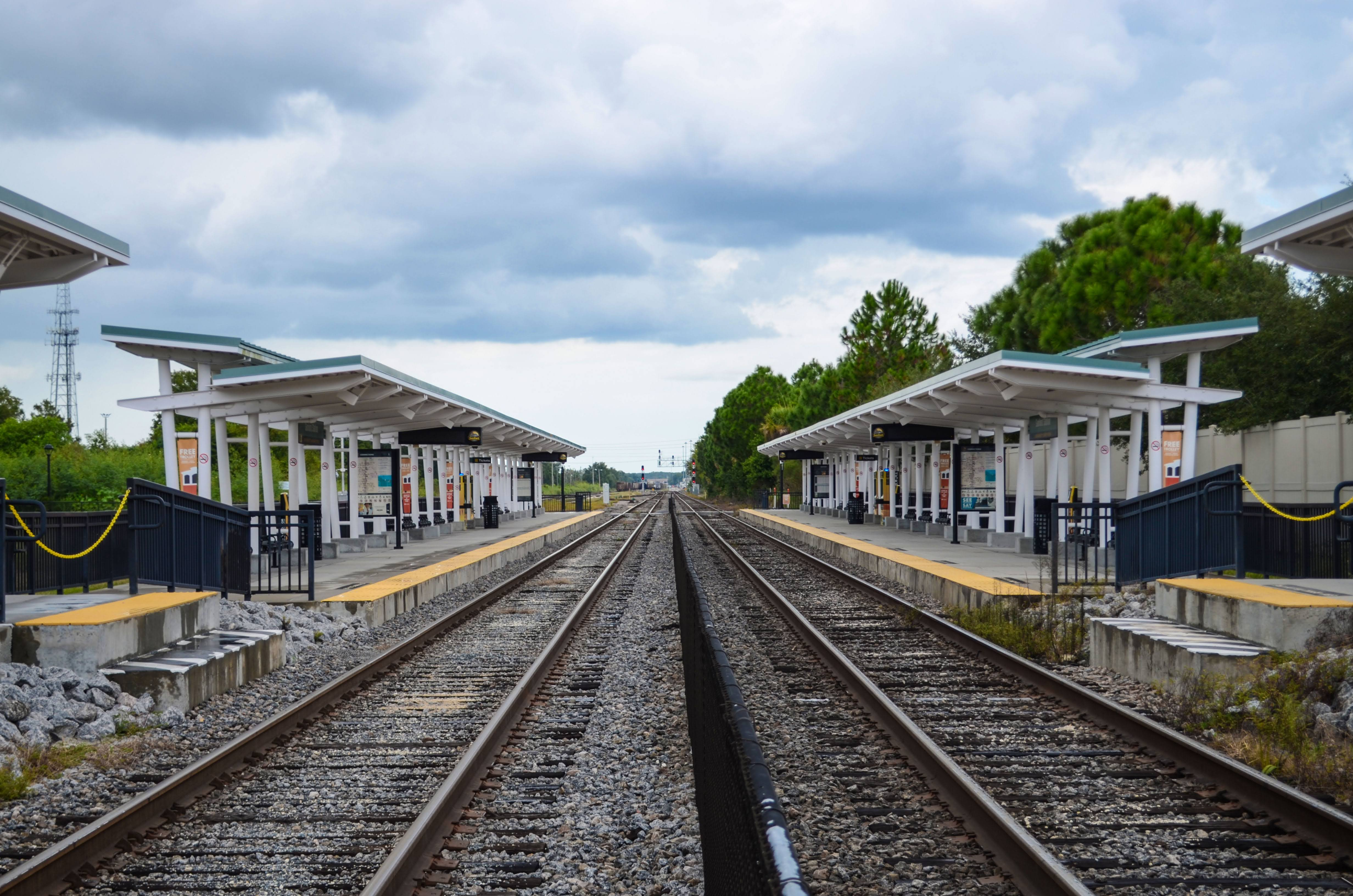
Sanford SunRail Station

Sanford is the southern terminus of Amtrak's Auto Train which conveys Eastern Seaboard travelers and their vehicles to Lorton, Virginia, about 25 miles (40 km) south of Washington, D.C. The nearest passenger-only Amtrak stations are in nearby Winter Park, FL and Deland, FL.

SunRail, the Central Florida commuter rail system, serves the city out of a new station off State Road 46. A new trolleybus (route and schedule) provides service between Sunrail and the historic downtown.

=== Scout (microtransit) ===
Scout is an on-demand microtransit service operating in Seminole County, Florida, including the City of Sanford, designed to replace the former fixed-route LYNX bus services.

=== Roads ===
Sanford is near the northeastern end of the I-4 Corridor between Daytona Beach and Orlando. The State Road 417, also known as Seminole Expressway, begins in Sanford at Interstate 4 and forms the Eastern Beltway around Orlando ending near the Walt Disney World Resort area.

==== Major routes ====
- I-4
- US 17 / US 92 (French Avenue)
- SR 417 (Seminole Expressway)
- SR 46 (25th Street)
- CR 46A (H.E. Thomas Jr Parkway)
- SR 429 / SR 429

The interchange of SR 417 and SR-429 is located midwest of Sanford in Seminole County, Florida.

=== Water ===
Sanford was historically a hub for Central Florida transportation as a port on the St. Johns River. Today, it has a downtown marina that includes free day slips for boaters visiting the downtown.

== Education ==
The Sanford public school district is served by Seminole County Public Schools.

=== Higher education ===
- Seminole State College of Florida

=== High schools ===
- Crooms Academy of Information Technology
- Seminole High School

=== Middle schools ===
- Millennium Middle School
- Sanford Middle School

=== Elementary schools ===
- All Souls Catholic School (K–8)
- Bentley Elementary School
- Galileo School for Gifted Learning (K-8)
- Goldsboro Elementary Magnet School
- Hamilton Elementary School of Engineering & Technology
- Idyllwilde Elementary Future Ready Academy
- Midway Elementary School of the Arts
- Pine Crest Elementary School of Innovation
- Wicklow Elementary School for Global Pathways
- Wilson Elementary School

== Public Library ==
Sanford is served by the North Branch Library of the Seminole County Public Library. It is located at 150 N. Palmetto Avenue, Sanford, Florida 32771.

== Attractions in Sanford ==
- The Central Florida Zoo and Botanical Gardens
- Local Parks
  - Fort Mellon Park
  - The Paw Park Sanford
  - Park on Park
- The Wayne Densch performing arts center
- Annual Oktoberfest (second weekend of October)
- Alive After Five (second Thursday of every month in downtown)
- Sanford Museum
- Central Florida Soapbox Derby
- Historic Sanford Memorial Stadium
- Theater West End
- Sanford Riverwalk

== City initiatives ==
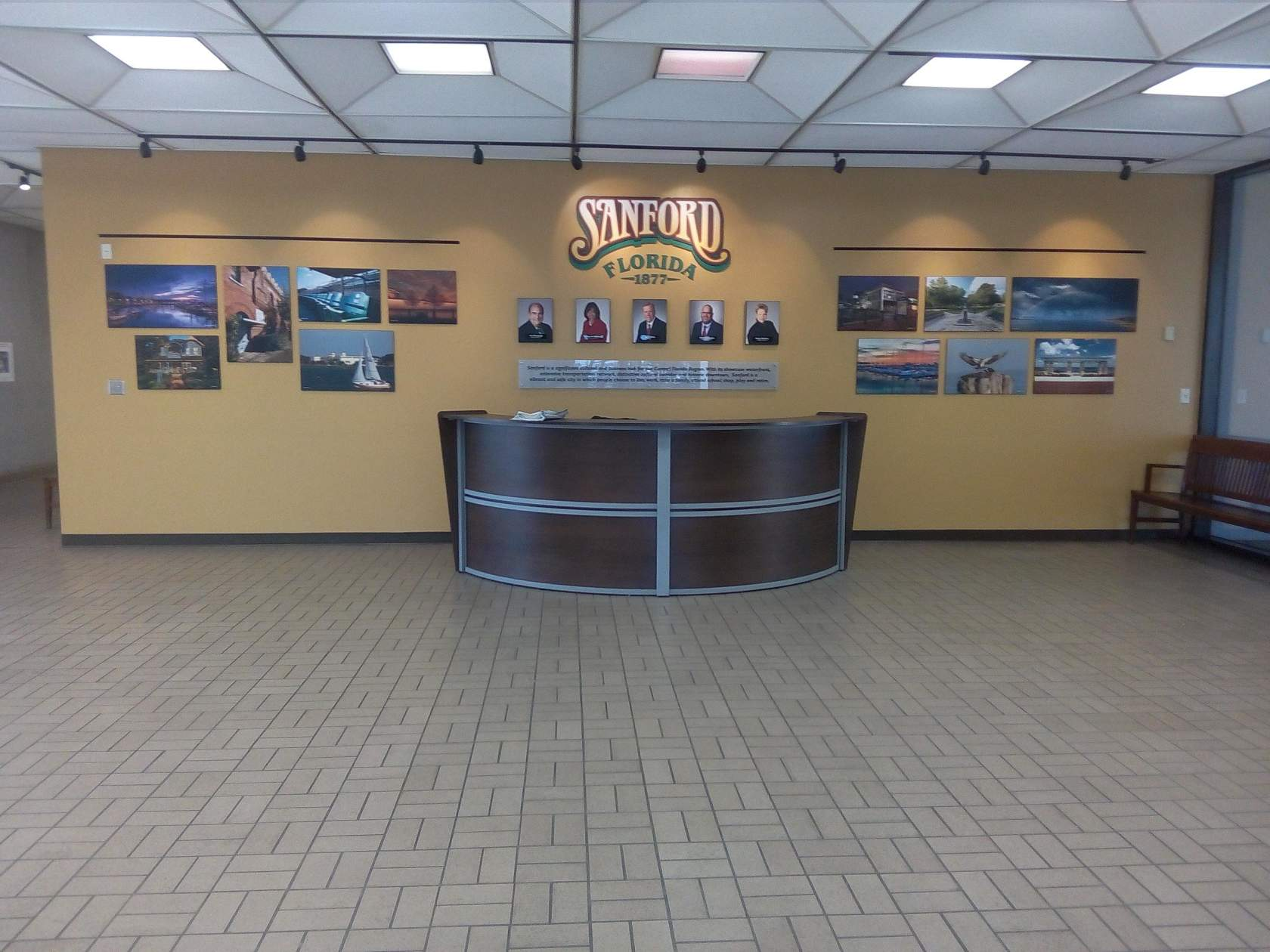
City Hall, 2017

The city's RiverWalk trail is a bike/walk/run trail that was completed in 2004. The ten-foot wide paved walkway spans a distance of several miles in Sanford's downtown area along the waterfront of Lake Monroe. Phase 2, which adds over 3000 feet to the trail, was completed in 2014. Phase 3 is expected to be complete by 2020.

The city completed multimillion-dollar streetscapes of 1st Street and Sanford Avenue in its historic downtown, using brick pavers, creating wider sidewalks, and adding trees, flowers, and benches.

Sanford is connected to the central Florida commuter railway SunRail, with the station 2 miles from the downtown.

To support green initiatives, Sanford has added five electric car charging stations. The city is proposing to replace streetlamp bulbs with LED lights.

In 2012, the city launched the "Imagine Sanford" initiative, which asks all Sanford residents to get involved in city planning by submitting and voting on improvement ideas via the city's Imagine Sanford website. The city of Sanford also launched a redesigned city government website in 2012.

== Notable people ==
- Ray-Ray Armstrong (b. 1991) – National Football League (NFL) player
- Red Barber (1908–1992) – Major League Baseball (MLB) sports commentator
- Zinn Beck (1885–1981) – MLB player
- Georgia Black (1906-1951) - community leader and trans woman
- Jeff Blake (b. 1970) – NFL player
- Reggie Branch (b. 1962) – NFL player
- Serderius Bryant (b. 1991) - CFL player
- Alwyn Cashe (1970–2005) – U.S. Army sergeant first class posthumously awarded the Medal of Honor
- Jim Courier (b. 1970) – tennis player
- Gabe Davis (b. 1999) – NFL player
- David Eckstein (b. 1975) – MLB player
- Rick Eckstein (b. 1973) – MLB hitting coach
- Kadeem Edwards (b. 1991) - NFL Player
- Trinity Fatu (b. 1987) – professional wrestler
- Elvira Garner (1886–1956) – author and illustrator
- Jimmy Horn Jr. (b. 2002) - NFL player
- Joseph C. Hutchinson (1894–1982) – U.S. Army lieutenant general
- Trayvon Martin (1995–2012) – murder victim
- Logan Misuraca (b. 1999) – stock car racer
- Tim Raines (b. 1959) – MLB player and coach
- Marty Raybon (b. 1959) – singer and co-founder of the Shenandoah and Raybon Brothers bands
- Bill Swaggerty (b. 1956) – MLB player
- Mary Lou Zoback (b. 1952) – geophysicist and seismologist

== Gallery ==
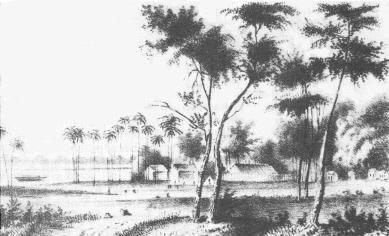
Fort Mellon, c. 1837

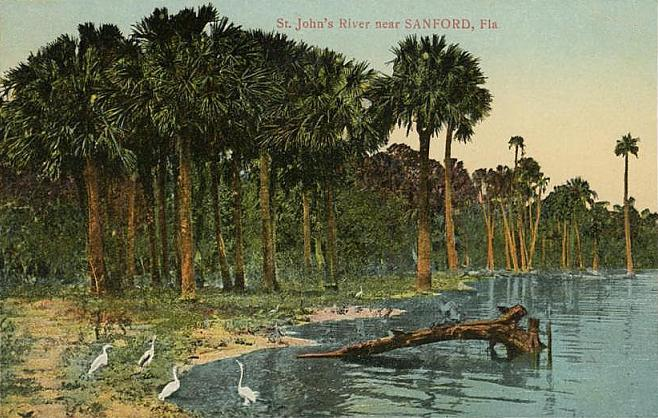
St. Johns River, c. 1910

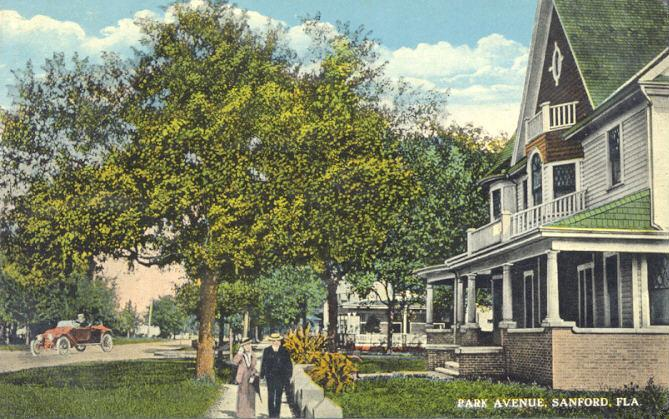
Park Avenue, c. 1910

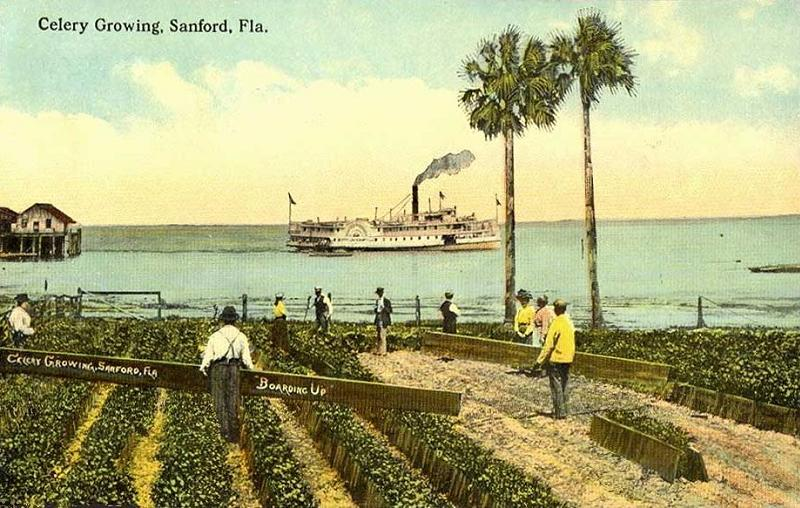
Celery growing, c. 1912

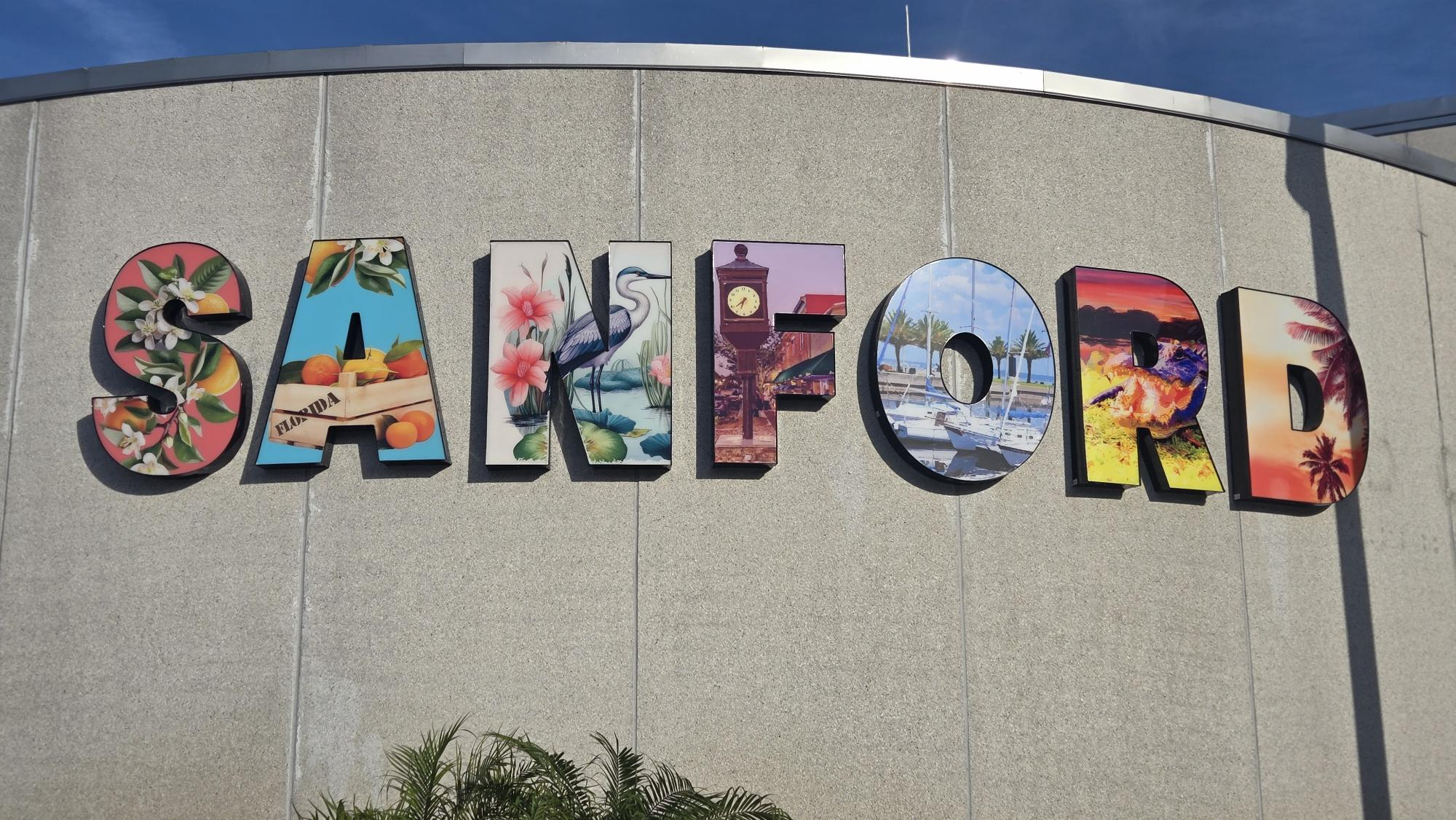
New City Hall Sign 2025
