= Goldsboro, Florida =

Goldsboro Goldsborough
- Town
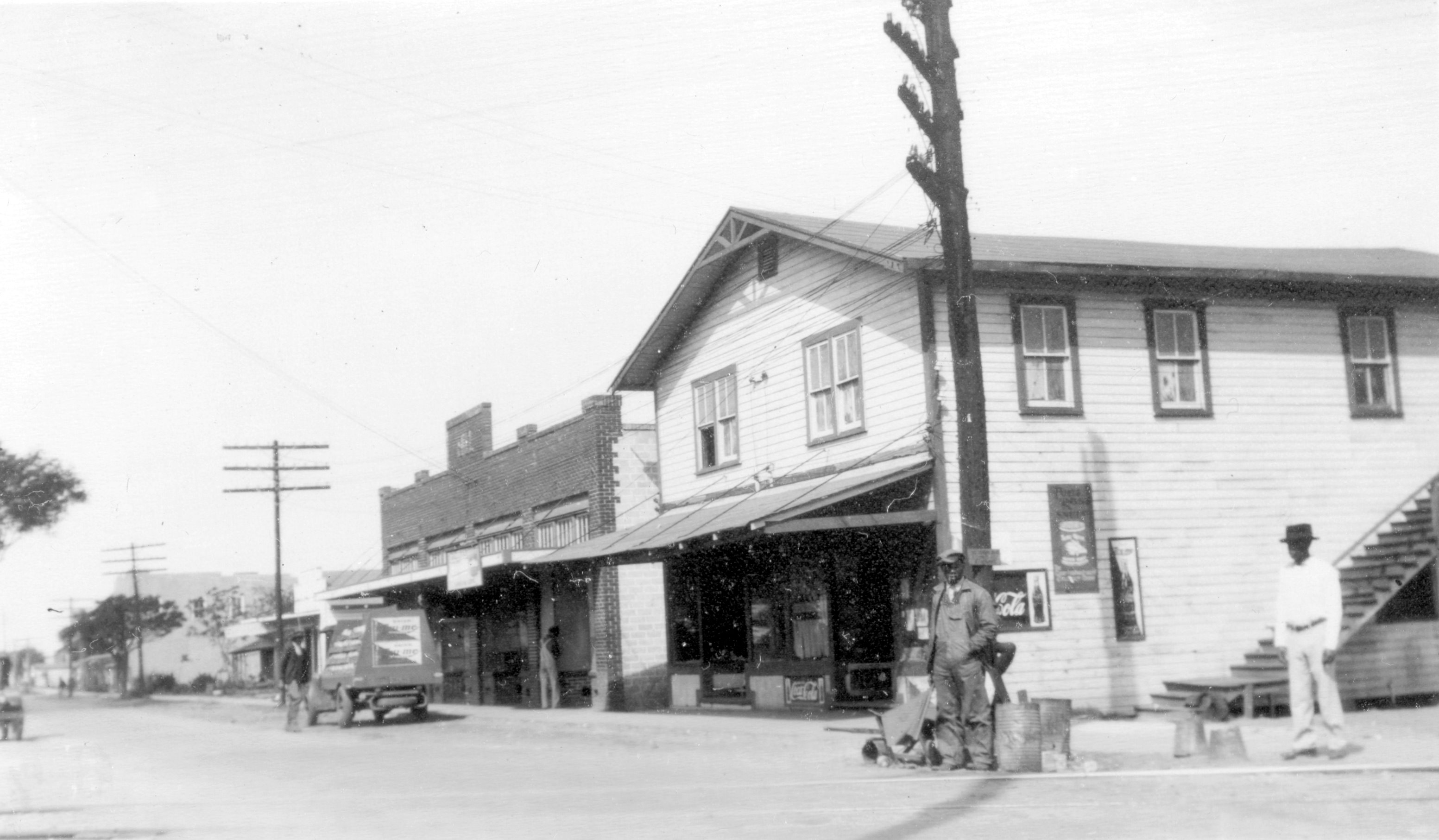
- Goldsborough c.1920

- Location of Goldsboro, Florida
- Coordinates: 28.8007°N 81.2798°W
- Country: United States
- State: Florida
- County: Seminole
- Incorporated: December 1, 1891
- Dissolved: April 26, 1911
- Founded by: William Clark

Area
  - Total: 1.018 sq mi (2.64 km^{2})
- Elevation: 35 ft (10.7 m)

Population
  - Total: 2,537
  - Density: 2,751/sq mi (1,062/km^{2})
- Time zone: UTC-5 (Eastern (EST))
  - Summer (DST): UTC-4 (EDT)
- ZIP code: 32772
- Area code: 321/407

Goldsboro is a community and former town in Seminole County, Florida. It was founded by the Freedmen's Bureau and later incorporated in 1891. One of the oldest African-American founded communities in the United States, it was established only a few years after nearby Eatonville. In 1911, the community was annexed into Sanford, Florida.

== History ==
The Freedmen's Bureau established Goldsboro during the Reconstruction Era for African Americans who worked at local railroad yards, farms, produce house and ice houses. In 1891, residents of Goldbsoro pursued incorporation of the town, publishing notices in the Sanford Journal as early as October 24, 1891. The town was incorporated at noon on December 1, 1891 by merchant William Clark and 19 registered African American voters. Walter Williams served as Goldsboro's first mayor until 1892. In 1900, the population of Goldsboro was 71. By 1905, the population had increased to 100 people. Morris Benjamin Bellamy Sr. was Goldsboro's mayor in 1911.

In 1911, the community of Sanford Heights seceded from Sanford, because of discord over municipal services provided by Sanford. This added to concerns that Sanford's ability to expand would be constrained by the surrounding towns of Goldsboro, Georgetown and Sanford Heights, as well as Lake Monroe to the north. Florida State Representative and former Sanford mayor Forrest Lake led legislative efforts to curtail Sanford Heights ability to incorporate, independent of Sanford. Goldsboro was also a target in Forrest Lake's annexation process, prompting Goldsboro's leaders to start a letter writing campaign to local newspapers. On April 6, 1911, the Sanford city council passed a resolution to annex Goldsboro and on April 26, 1911 the Florida legislature passed the Sanford Charter Bill, dissolving the incorporation of both Sanford and Goldsboro, and reorganizing Sanford as a city that included Goldsboro within its boundaries.

Goldsboro's identity slowly eroded after it lost its charter and was annexed. Sanford renamed several of Goldsboro's historically-named streets. Clark Street, named for the town's founder, was renamed Lake Street after Forrest Lake, the man responsible for the loss of Goldboro's status as a town.

=== Recent history ===
In 2007, a Public Safety Complex was slated for construction in Goldsboro as part of Sanford's efforts to revitalize the area. In November 2010, the Sanford Police Department was relocated to the new $20 million, 76,000 square feet (7,100 m^{2}) complex on 13th Street, which it shares with the Sanford Fire Department and a five-bay fire station.

A historical museum opened in Goldsboro in 2011, at the site of the original post office. The museum exhibits photographs, historic documents and furniture donated by local residents.

On February 28, 2013, Lake Avenue was renamed William Clark Avenue, to honor the town's founding father.

== Demographics ==
Historical population
Census	Pop.	Note	%±
1900	71		—
1910	286		302.8%
U.S. Decennial Census

== See also ==
- Angola, Florida, settlement of escaped slaves
- Zora Neale Hurston
