= Ian Williams (American football) =

American football player (born 1989)

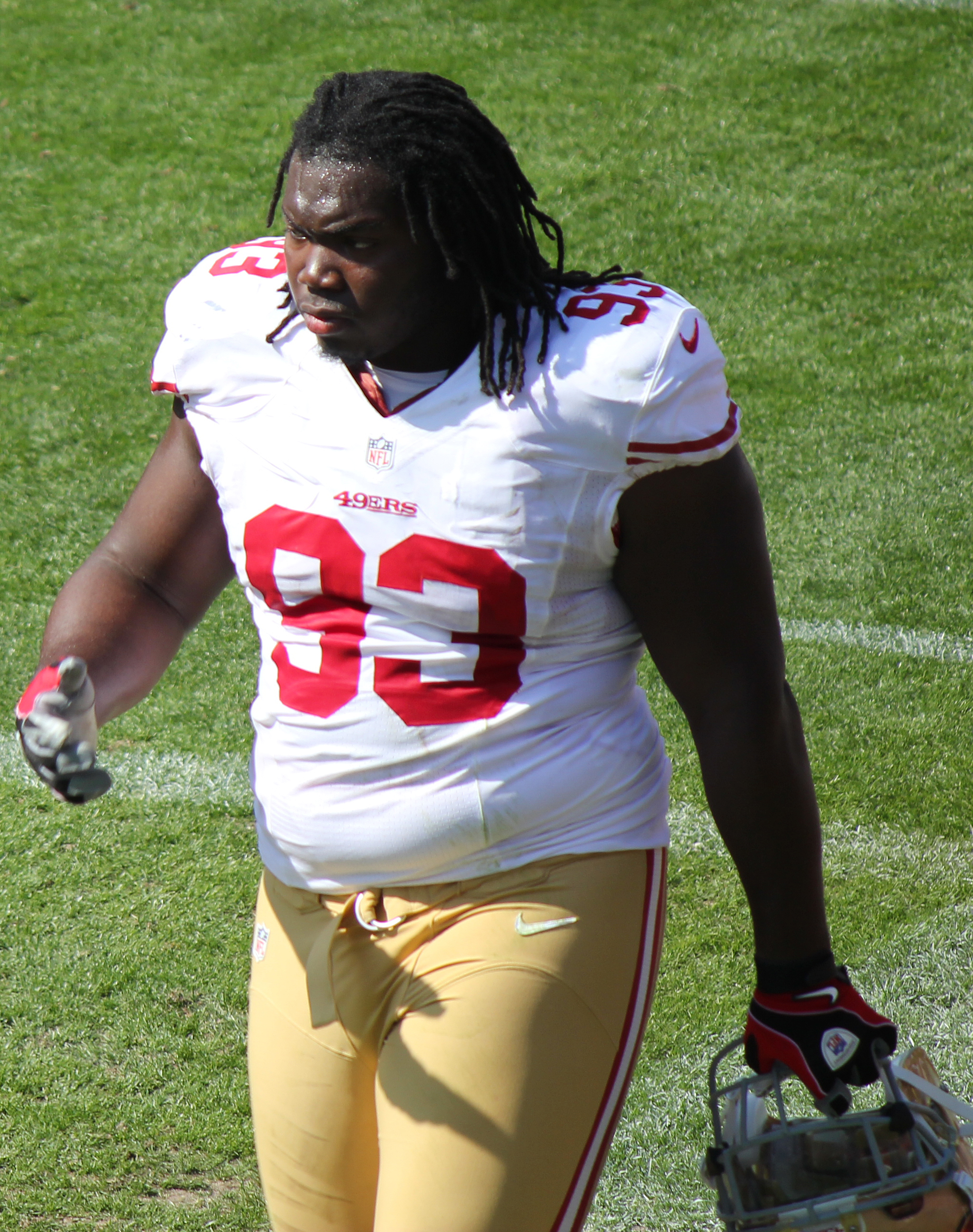
- Williams with the San Francisco 49ers in 2012

No. 93
- Position: Nose tackle

Personal information
- Born: August 31, 1989 (age 37); Altamonte Springs, Florida, U.S.
- Listed height: 6 ft 1 in (1.85 m)
- Listed weight: 305 lb (138 kg)

Career information
- High school: Longwood (FL) Lyman
- College: Notre Dame
- NFL draft: 2011: undrafted

Career history
- San Francisco 49ers (2011–2016)

Career NFL statistics
- Total tackles: 91
- Sacks: 2
- Forced fumbles: 1
- Fumble recoveries: 1
- Stats at Pro Football Reference

Ian Williams (born August 31, 1989) is an American former professional football player who was a nose tackle for the San Francisco 49ers of the National Football League (NFL). He played college football for the Notre Dame Fighting Irish and was signed by the 49ers as an undrafted free agent in 2011.

== Early life ==
Williams grew up in Altamonte Springs, Florida, and attended Lyman High School, where he played football for coach Bill Caughell. In his junior year, Ian was responsible for 83 tackles, 23 tackles for loss (TFL), 12 hurries, 4 forced fumbles, 2 sacks, 4 fumble recoveries and 4 passes broken up, as the Greyhounds won their third straight 5A district title and beat Melbourne High School (Melbourne, Florida) for Lyman’s first Florida playoff win in school history. Williams continued his dominance from the defensive tackle position in 2006, recording over 40 tackles, 18 TFL, and 12 sacks. He was recognized as the 120th rated prep player nationally on ESPN 150's listing and 30th on the South Florida Sun-Sentinel list of top 50 Florida prospects.

Williams was heavily recruited, receiving scholarship offers from Notre Dame as well as most of the top southern programs in the country, including by Alabama, Auburn, Clemson, Florida, Mississippi, and South Carolina. Before her death in 1995, Ian's maternal grandmother, Lily May Green, had told Ian's mother Natalie Williams that her grandson would one day play for the University of Notre Dame. Not wanting to influence his decision, Natalie waited until after Ian signed with Notre Dame to tell her son of his grandmother's prescient forecast.

== College career ==
=== Freshman year ===
Recruited to play nose tackle in then-defensive coordinator Corwin Brown's 3–4 system, Williams played in all 12 games his freshman year, starting two. He totaled 45 tackles, 19 solo stops, 1.5 TFL on the year and was named a Freshman All-American. His 45 tackles were the third most for any freshman defensive lineman in Notre Dame history. He ranked sixth on the team in tackles and was the only player ranked in the top 12 in tackles on the team who did not start at least four games.

=== Sophomore year ===
Williams appeared in all 13 games for the Irish, making 7 starts. He had 40 total tackles including 2 TFL, in addition to a pass break up. Williams anchored the defense against Pittsburgh amassing 6 tackles and 2 TFL. He recorded 7 tackles against Navy, 8 against Syracuse, and 3 tackles and a pass break up against the USC Trojans.

=== Junior year ===
The Irish made a switch to the 4-3 defense under Jon Tenuta. Williams shifted from a 3–4 nose tackle to a 4–3 defensive tackle. Williams played in all 12 games, starting 8. He recorded 39 tackles, 6 TFL, a pass breakup and his first career interception.

=== Senior year ===
New Irish defensive coordinator, Bob Diaco, switched the defense back to a 3–4 scheme. Williams thrived in a return to his natural position at nose tackle, anchoring the middle of the Irish defensive front and recording 37 tackles, 2 sacks and an interception in 7.5 games. Williams suffered an MCL sprain against Navy on October 23, 2010. The injury did not require surgery, but it did force Williams to miss the last four games of his senior season. Prior to the injury, he was one of only two players to appear in every game of his four-year Notre Dame career (Kerry Neal is the other). Williams returned to practice in early December healthy enough to play for Notre Dame in the Hyundai Sun Bowl against the Miami Hurricanes on December 31, 2010.

== Professional career ==
Williams was signed by the San Francisco 49ers as an undrafted free agent following the 2011 NFL draft on July 25, 2011.

On March 11, 2013, Williams signed a two-year contract extension with the 49ers.

On September 15, 2013, Williams broke his left ankle in a game against the Seattle Seahawks and was subsequently placed on injured reserve, effectively ending his season.

On September 9, 2015, Williams was named a defensive team captain by head coach Jim Tomsula.

Williams originally signed a five-year $27.5 million contract with the 49ers on March 9, 2016. However, on March 21, 2016, the deal was reduced to one–year, $3 million after Williams failed his physical following ankle surgery.

On October 27, 2016, Williams was released with an injury settlement.
