= Paul J. Hagerty High School =

Location
- 3225 Lockwood Boulevard; Oviedo, Florida 32765; United States; 28°37′32″N 81°10′39″W

Information
- Type: Public high school
- Established: 2005
- School district: Seminole County Public Schools
- Principal: Robert Frasca
- Teaching staff: 109.21 (FTE)
- Enrollment: 2,566 (2023-2024)
- Student to teacher ratio: 23.50
- Colors: Black, silver and blue
- Nickname: Huskies
- Website: HHS School website

Hagerty High School is a public secondary school in Oviedo, Florida, United States. It is part of Seminole County Public Schools. It is the academic and athletic rival school of Oviedo High School. In 2015, Hagerty High School was ranked 1st of 18 high schools in the Seminole County Public Schools by U.S. News & World Report.

== History ==
In 2000, the site of Hagerty High School was Lawton Chiles Middle School. In the fall of 2004, the school moved to its current location at Sanctuary Drive, and construction started on Hagerty, and the school opened a year later in 2005, to help the influx of students at Oviedo High School.

== Extracurricular activities ==
Hagerty High School has athletic programs in lacrosse, volleyball, tennis, swimming, golf, football, cheerleading, cross country, bowling, weightlifting, track and field, basketball, water polo, soccer, softball, wrestling, robotics and baseball. Hagerty is in the Seminole Athletic Conference.

== Demographics ==
2,419 students attend HHS. The student body is 64.4% White, 20.3% Hispanic, 6% Asian, 5.9% Black, 2.6% multi-racial, 0.6% Pacific Islander, and 0.2% Native American. 51% are female, and 49% are male. 11.3% are gifted.

== Notable alumni ==
- Garrett Baumann, MLB pitcher
- Jeff Driskel, National Football League (NFL) quarterback
- Zach Eflin, Major League Baseball (MLB) pitcher
- Riley Greene, MLB outfielder
- Vaughn Grissom, MLB infielder
- Matt Lee, college football center
- Ryan Mountcastle, MLB infielder
