= Zechariah Cartledge =

American first responder advocate (born 2008)

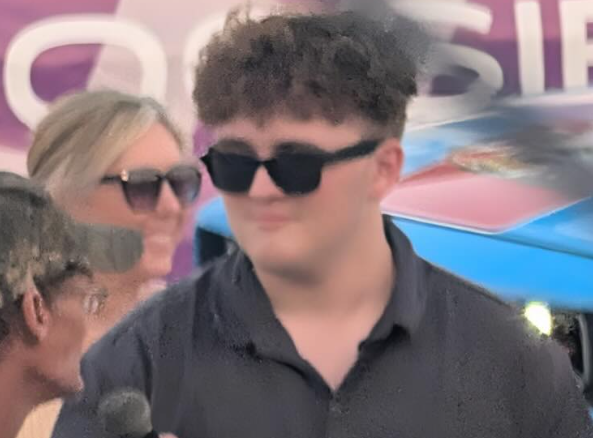
- Cartledge interviewing drivers at a local NASCAR Regional event, 2026
- Born: Zechariah Christian Cartledge; October 21, 2008 (age 18); Winter Springs, Florida
- Known for: Founder of Running 4 Heroes, Inc. NASCAR Regional Driver and Track Announcer
- Height: 5 ft 7 in (170 cm)
- Website: https://running4heroes.org

Zechariah Christian Cartledge (born October 21, 2008) is the founder of the non-profit organization Running 4 Heroes, Inc. His nonprofit runs and raises money to honor fallen, injured, retired, or serving First Responders.

Following the endeavors of Running 4 Heroes, Cartledge began racing in a NASCAR Regional series at New Smyrna Speedway. As of August 2026, Cartledge also acts as the PA Announcer for Citrus County Speedway.

== Running 4 Heroes & Early Advocacy ==
In his youth, Cartledge greatly appreciated First Responders and the work that they provided for their communities. In 2019, at age 9, he founded Running 4 Heroes with the goal to honor First Responders that have lost their life while serving their country. His father, Chad Cartledge, is President of the organization.

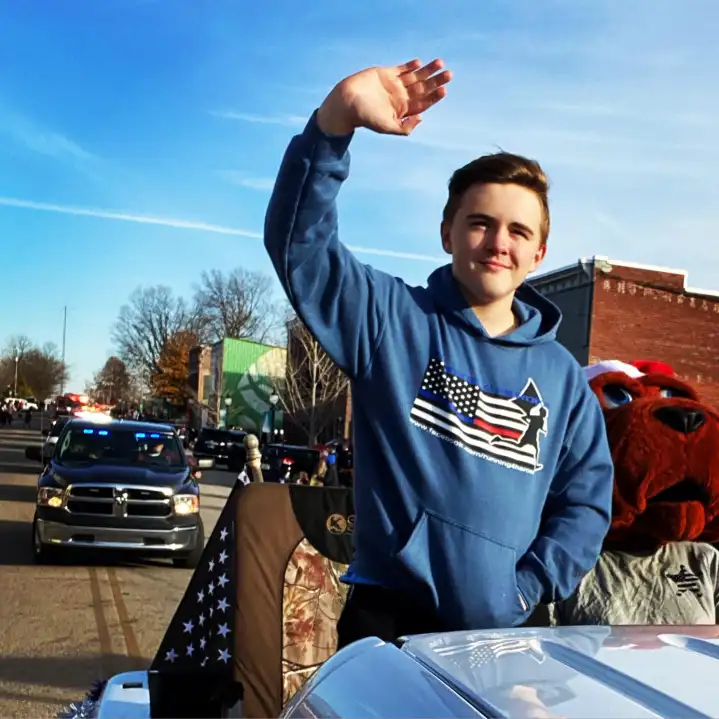
Cartledge at a Running 4 Heroes event in Spencer County Tennessee.

In 2019, Cartledge announced that he would run 1 mile for every police officer lost in the line of duty during 2018, amounting to 148 miles. His ambition was recognized by Attorney General Ashley Moody, who awarded him her first ever 'Back the Blue Award'. Moody later commented, “Zechariah’s unique and passionate support for the law enforcement community Is admirable. That is why he is the perfect first award recipient for our Back the Blue Campaign. I look forward to following his mission this year and praise him for bringing attention to the ultimate sacrifice these officers made.”

In February 2021, Cartledge and Running 4 Heroes sponsored Mike Harmon Racing's Bayley Currey for the NASCAR Xfinity Series opener race at Daytona International Speedway.

In December 2024, at age 16, he ran his 1,572nd mile, the final one he would run for Running 4 Heroes, as he was no longer eligible to participate as a Youth Runner due to his age. Cartledge later referred to this run as "the end of an era"

== Racing & Announcing Career ==
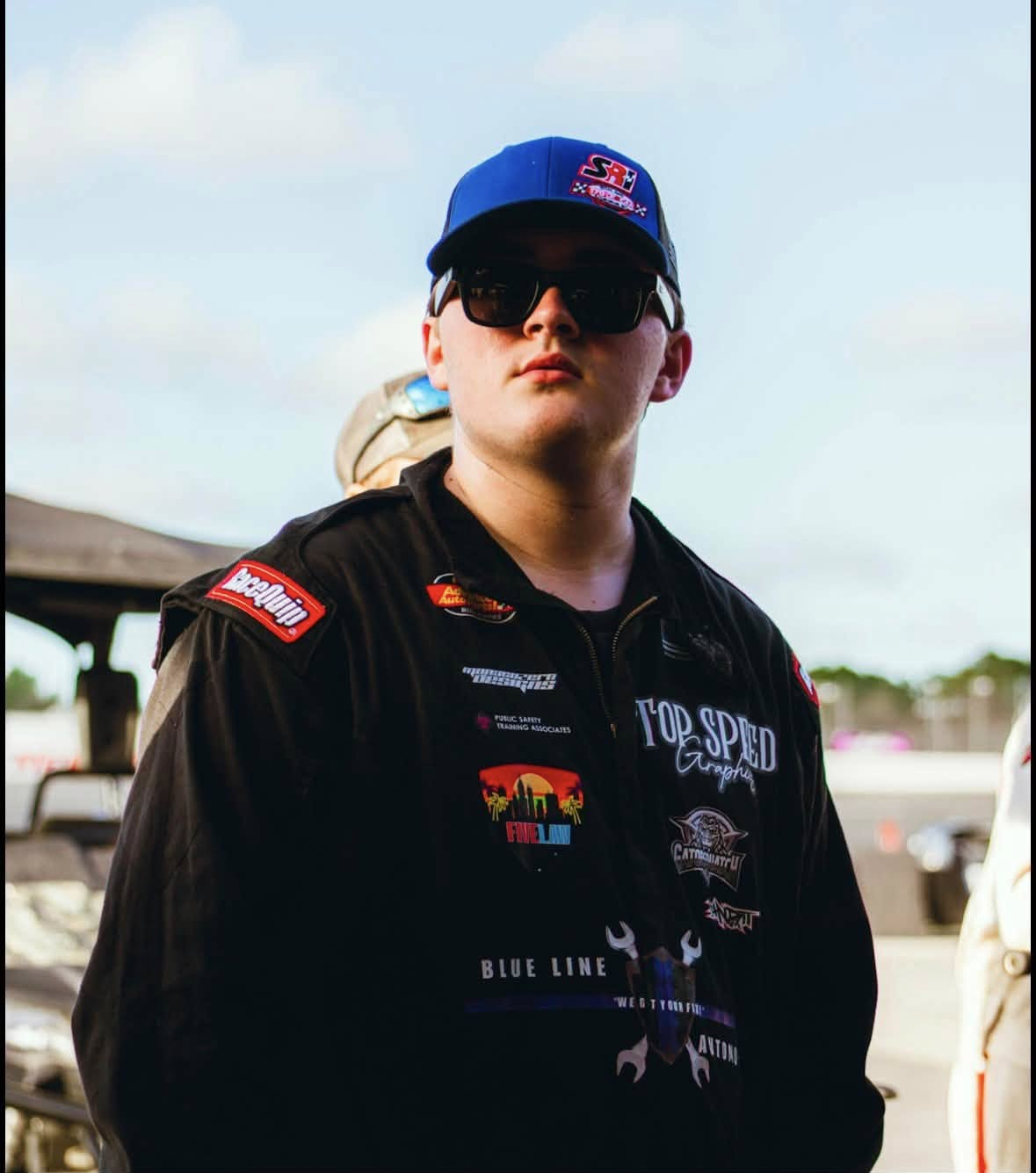
Cartledge at a NASCAR Regional event at New Smyrna Speedway.

In February 2026, Cartledge began his NASCAR Regional rookie season at New Smyrna Speedway while also starting a track announcing career, becoming “The Voice” of Citrus County Speedway until October 2026.
