= Seminole County Public Schools =

School district in Florida

Address
- 400 East Lake Mary Boulevard Sanford, Seminole county, Florida, 32773-7127; United States

District information
- Type: Public
- Grades: PK-12
- Superintendent: Serita D. Beamon
- NCES District ID: 1201710

Students and staff
- Students: 62,211
- Teachers: 3,872
- Student–teacher ratio: 16.1:1

Other information
- Website: www.scps.k12.fl.us

Seminole County Public Schools (SCPS) is a public school district that covers Seminole County, Florida. The district is the 12th biggest school district in Florida. As of the 2025-2026 school year, the district has 62,211 students and 3,872 teachers; the district is graded "A", according to the Florida Department of Education. The district was ranked #1 in Florida for STEM education in Florida, as well as being the top district in Florida for Calculus & Physics enrollment.

== History ==
During the COVID-19 pandemic in Florida, Seminole County allowed parents to opt out of their children wearing masks, but if there was no parental opt-out, students had to wear masks. In August 2021, 17% of students were exempted.

== School board ==
The district school board is elected on a non-partisan basis. Members serve four year terms.

Seminole County School Board
Position	Incumbent	Next election
District 1	Kristine Kraus	2030
District 2	Kelley Davis	2030
District 3	Abby Sanchez	2028
District 4	Robin Dehlinger	2028
District 5	Autumn Garick	2030

After the 2026 elections, members Kristine Kraus and Autumn Garick are re-elected, while Holton Mills won the open race for District 2. Their term begins on November 17th, 2026.

== Schools ==
The district operates 57 traditional schools. This includes nine high schools, 12 middle schools, and 36 elementary schools.

=== High schools (9) ===
- Crooms Academy of Information Technology (Panther)
- Hagerty High School (Husky)
- Lake Brantley High School (Patriot)
- Lake Howell High School (Silverhawk)
- Lake Mary High School (Ram)
- Lyman High School (Greyhound)
- Oviedo High School (Lion)
- Seminole High School (Seminole)
- Winter Springs High School (Bear)

Out of the nine high schools, Seminole High School and Winter Springs High School has an active IB program available for students.

=== Middle schools (12) ===
- Greenwood Lakes Middle School (Soaring Eagles)
- Indian Trails Middle School (Trailblazer)
- Jackson Heights Middle School (Bobcat)
- Lawton Chiles Middle School (Panther)
- Markham Woods Middle School (Mustang)
- Millennium Middle School (Falcon)
- Milwee Middle School (Spartan)
- Rock Lake Middle School (Raider)
- Sanford Middle School (Warrior)
- South Seminole Academy (Lighthouse, Hurricanes)
- Teague Middle School (Tiger)
- Tuskawilla Middle School (Titan)

=== Elementary schools (37) ===
- Altamonte Elementary School
- Bear Lake Elementary School
- Bentley Elementary School
- Carillon Elementary School
- Casselberry Elementary School
- Crystal Lake Elementary School
- Eastbrook Elementary School
- English Estates Elementary School
- Evans Elementary School
- Forest City Elementary School
- Geneva Elementary School
- Goldsboro Elementary School
- Hamilton Elementary School
- Heathrow Elementary School
- Highlands Elementary School
- Idyllwilde Elementary School
- Keeth Elementary School
- Lake Mary Elementary School
- Lake Orienta Elementary School
- Lawton Elementary School
- Layer Elementary School
- Longwood Elementary School
- Midway Elementary School
- Partin Elementary School
- Pine Crest Elementary School
- Rainbow Elementary School
- Red Bug Elementary School
- Sabal Point Elementary School
- Spring Lake Elementary School
- Stenstrom Elementary School
- Sterling Park Elementary School
- Walker Elementary School
- Wekiva Elementary School
- Wicklow Elementary School
- Wilson Elementary School
- Winter Springs Elementary School
- Woodlands Elementary School

=== Charter schools (4) ===
There are the four charter schools that are accountable to SCPS.

- Choices in Learning Elementary Charter School
- Galileo School for Gifted Learning
- United Cerebral Palsy School
- Seminole Science Charter School

=== Home schools and virtual schools ===
The district operates home school and virtual school programs.

=== Voluntary Pre-K ===
The district operates voluntary pre-K at selected locations within the District.
