= Lake Brantley High School =

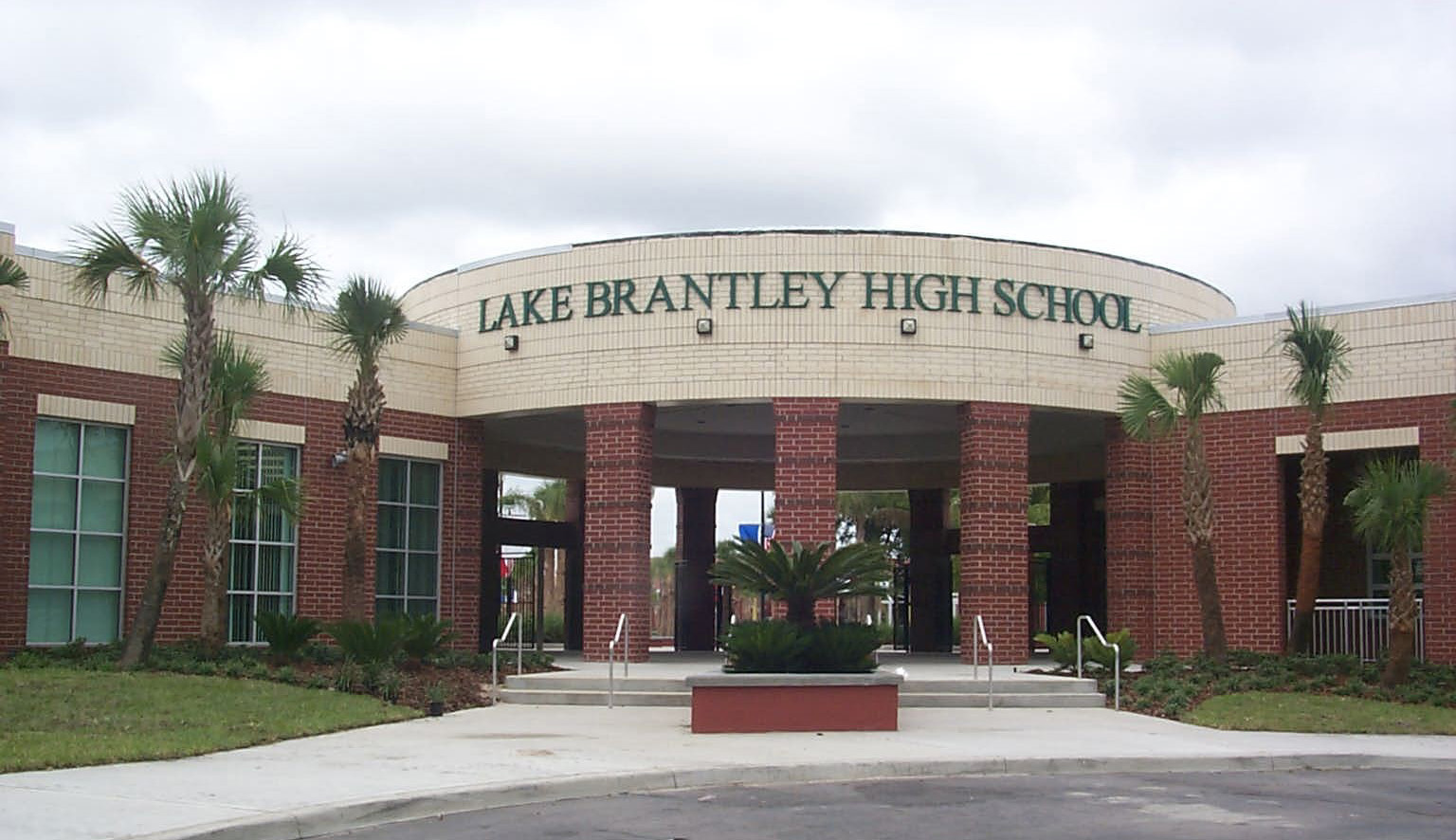

Location
- 991 Sand Lake Road; Altamonte Springs, Florida 32714; United States; 28°40′53.0466″N 81°25′22.50″W

Information
- Other name: LBHS
- Type: Public
- Established: 1972; 54 years ago
- Principal: Jacob Jarzynka
- Teaching staff: 121.33 (FTE)
- Enrollment: 2,815 (2023–24)
- Student to teacher ratio: 23.20
- Colors: Red, White, and Blue
- Mascot: Patriot
- Website: www.lakebrantley.com

Lake Brantley High School (LBHS) is located in Altamonte Springs, Florida, a suburban community approximately 13 miles (20 km) north of Orlando. It is a public high school serving grade levels 9–12 in Seminole County, FL, operated by Seminole County Public Schools. The school, which opened in 1972, is ranked 79th on Newsweek magazine's 2005 list of the top 100 high schools in the United States and 424th in the 2009 Newsweek list.

== Academics ==
- Offers 27 Advanced Placement courses in a wide variety of academic subjects as well as in elective interests
- Received an "A" rating from the Florida Department of Education in 2006
- Had 7 National Merit Scholar finalists in the class of 2006 and had 2 in 2007
- Highest ACT and SAT scores within the district for 2002 and significantly higher than the state average
- Over 2008 AP tests administered in 2017.
- 1,212 students scored 3 or higher on the 2017 AP tests
- In the class of 2017, there were 22 AP National Scholars, 76 Scholars w/Distinction, 45 Scholars w/Honors, 129 AP Scholars.
