= Crooms Academy of Information Technology =

Public High School in Seminole County, Florida

Coordinates: 28.801858°N 81.290172°W

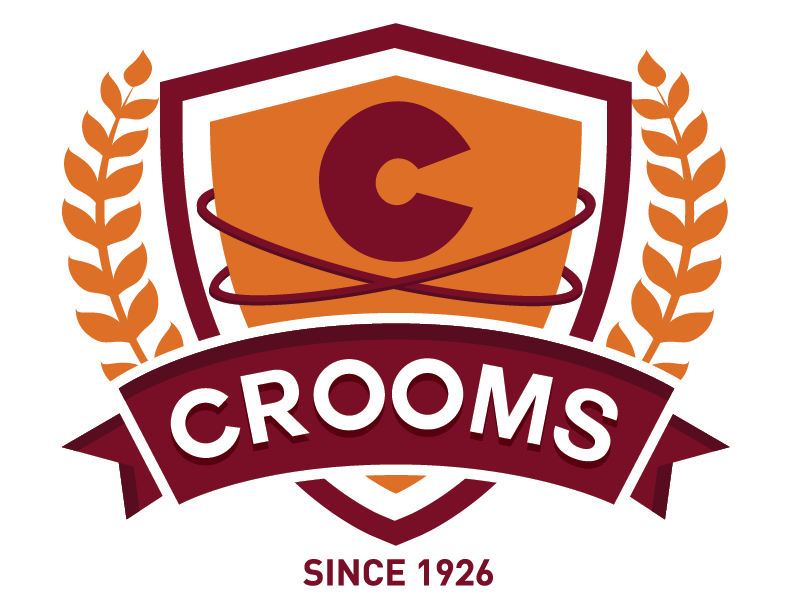

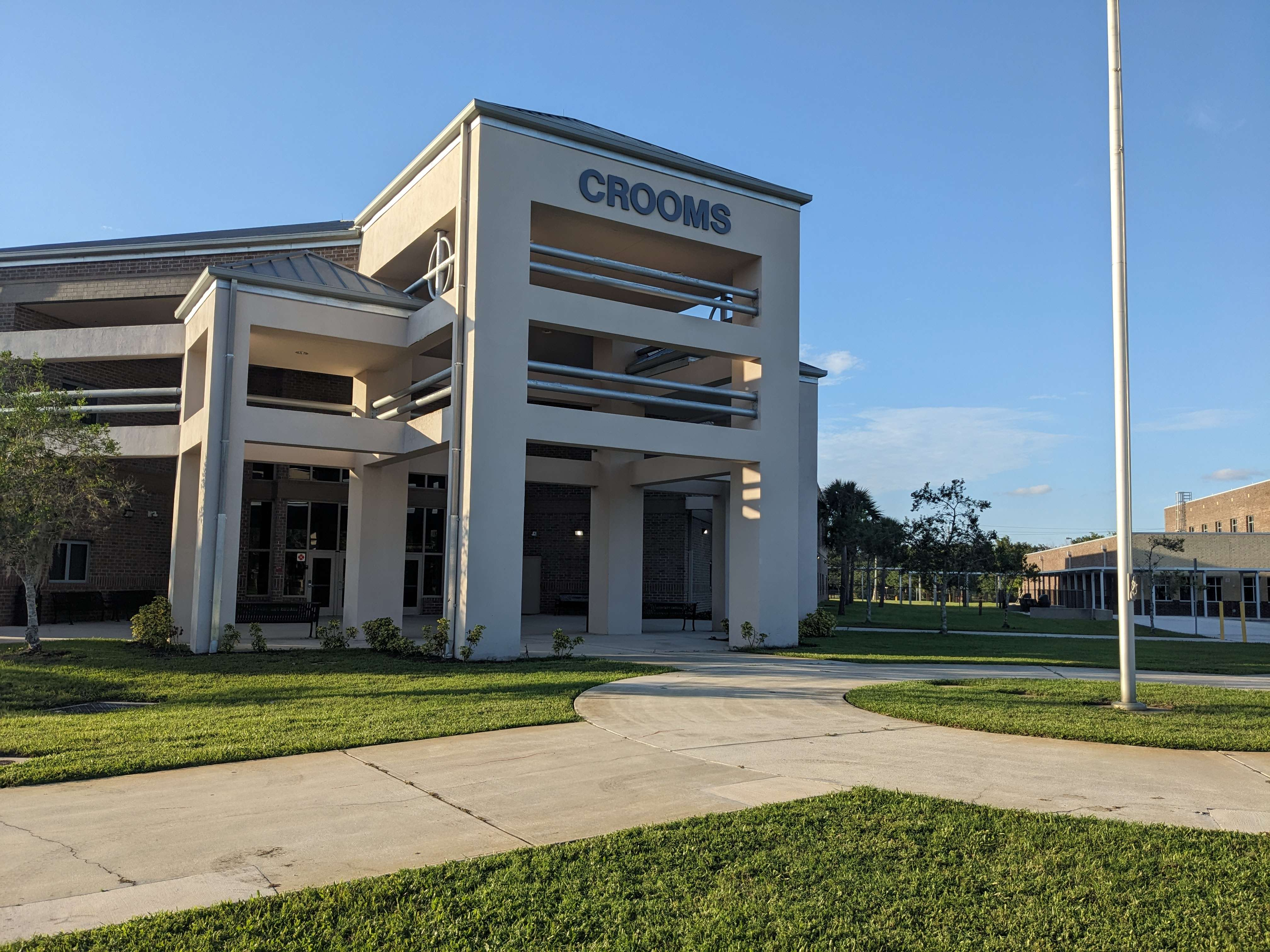
- Front of Crooms Academy in 2023

Information
- Type: Public Magnet School
- Motto: Rich in Tradition, Pride, and Vision
- Established: 1926, 2001 in present form
- Founder: Joseph N. Crooms
- School district: Seminole County Public Schools
- Principal: Brandon Hanshaw
- Teaching staff: 26.00 (on an FTE basis)
- Grades: 9-12
- Enrollment: 738 (2024–2025)
- Student to teacher ratio: 20.50
- Colors: Orange & Maroon
- Mascot: Panther
- Nickname: Croomies
- Website: https://www.cait.scps.k12.fl.us/

Crooms Academy of Information Technology (Crooms AoIT), locally called Crooms, is a technology magnet school located in Sanford, Florida, known for being one of the few schools in the United States that issues laptops to every student. Crooms is much smaller than many U.S. high schools, having around 700 students. The school is operated by Seminole County Public Schools.

== History ==
Crooms Academy was founded in 1926 by Joseph N. Crooms as the county's first high school for African-American students.

In 1970 Seminole County was desegregated and for several years Crooms served as the 9th Grade Center for Seminole High School. In 1973 the original building burned and in the past years the other school buildings have deteriorated. In the early 1980s, the 9th Grade Center was discontinued and the school lost its identity as a community high school. Its role changed several times and has included an administrative center, a school for students with behavior problems, and a place for pregnant teenagers. Most recently, it was a school for academically struggling students. In 2000, the U.S. Justice Department agreed to lift Seminole's desegregation order by 2003 if the county met certain conditions. Included in this is rebuilding Crooms Academy and turning it into an academy of information technology.

In 2009, Crooms began to offer college credits from Seminole State College through the dual enrollment program. In 2015, Crooms began to offer A.A. degrees from Seminole State College, becoming the first collegiate high school in Seminole County, and the only SCPS high school to offer a college degree.

== Buildings ==
The campus consists of a two story building consisting mostly of classrooms and computers in labs (Building 1), a gymnasium (Building 3), and a cafeteria (Building 2). The cafeteria building also houses four classrooms and a computer lab. The small size of the campus allows for a capacity of approximately 700 students. A new gymnasium was finished during the 2020-2021 school year.

== Technology ==
Dell is the number one supplier of the technology at Crooms. Each student is issued a laptop based on grade level and return condition of previously issued laptops. In addition, every student is provided with a protective laptop case and a charger. Laptops, laptop cases, and chargers are to be returned to the school at the end of the school year. Most classrooms at Crooms are equipped with a laptop or desktop computer for the student to use in case their laptop is being repaired.

The school's cyber center bears resemblance to a standard high school library, complete with sofas, books, and numerous tables. Attention is given to providing locations for students to utilize their laptops in a quiet, studious environment. Charging stations are located in numerous areas around the room.

The school features a large TV or projector in each classroom. Most lessons and assignments are uploaded to eCampus, the online education system used by Seminole County Public Schools, and can subsequently be accessed by students both in school and at home.

== Awards ==
For the 2005-2006, 2006–2007, 2007–2008, and 2008-2009 school years, Crooms was rated an A.

Crooms Academy was also ranked as one of U.S. News' Top 100 Best High Schools in the country for 2008, moving from a bronze to silver medal.

In August 2010, Crooms was awarded the 2010 Business-Education Partnership Award for being recognized for the educational programs they provides to their students.

In October 2011, Crooms was ranked #1 in a survey done by U.S. News for the 2012 Most Connected Classrooms in the United States.

Crooms has been recognized by NAF as a Distinguished Academy, the highest honor given by NAF, for eight consecutive years.

Crooms is recognized by Magnet Schools of America as an academy of excellence, the highest honor given by the organization.
