= Georgetown, Florida =

- Unincorporated community
- Location of Georgetown in Florida
- Coordinates: 29°23′29″N 81°38′19″W
- Country: United States
- State: Florida
- County: Putnam
- Elevation: 23 ft (7.0 m)
- Time zone: UTC-5 (Eastern (EST))
  - Summer (DST): UTC-4 (EDT)
- ZIP code: 32139
- Area code: 386
- FIPS code: 12-12107
- GNIS feature ID: 305723

Georgetown is an unincorporated community in Putnam County, Florida, United States, located on the shores of Lake George. The community can be found south of the Welaka State Forest and north of the Lake George Conservation Area.

== Geography ==
Georgetown is located at 29°23′29″N 81°38′19″W (29.391362, -81.638689). Its elevation in 23 feet (7 m).

== Notable people ==
- Red Causey, was a right-handed Major League Baseball pitcher who played for the New York Giants.
