= Bob Sindler =

American politician

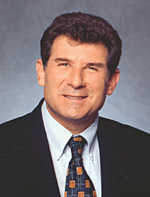

Member of the Orange County Commission from the 2nd district
- In office November 17, 1998 – November 21, 2006
- Preceded by: Tom Staley
- Succeeded by: Fred Brummer

Member of the Florida House of Representatives
- In office November 8, 1988 – November 3, 1998
- Preceded by: Fran Carlton
- Succeeded by: Fred Brummer
- Constituency: 39th district (1988–1992); 38th district (1992–1998)

Personal details
- Born: August 1, 1952 (age 73) Sumter, South Carolina
- Party: Democratic
- Children: Julie Elizabeth, Amy Joyce, David McLeod, Sean Edgar, Derek Sven
- Education: Clemson University (B.S.); University of Georgia College of Veterinary Medicine (D.V.M.)
- Profession: Veterinarian

Robert B. "Bob" Sindler (born August 1, 1952) is a Democratic politician who served in the Florida House of Representatives from 1988 to 1998, and who served on the Orange County Commission from 1998 to 2006.

== History ==
Sindler was born in Sumter, South Carolina, and attended Clemson University, graduating with his bachelor's degree in 1973. He then attended the College of Veterinary Medicine at the University of Georgia, receiving his Doctorate in Veterinary Medicine in 1977, and moved to Florida later that year. In 1980, Sindler unsuccessfully ran for a seat on the Orange County School Board

== Florida House of Representatives ==
In 1988, incumbent State Representative Fran Carlton declined to seek re-election, instead opting to run for Orange County Clerk of the Courts. Sindler ran to succeed her in the 39th District, which included Apopka and College Park in northwestern Orange County. Sindler faced retired firefighter Will Campbell in the Democratic primary. He was endorsed by the Orlando Sentinel, which praised his "intelligence, interest and energy," noting that his "scientific background should help him tackle complex environmental issues." Sindler defeated Campbell by a wide margin, winning 64% of the vote to Campbell's 36%, and advanced to the general election, where he faced Roger Williams, the Republican nominee. During the campaign, both Sindler and Williams identified themselves as "conservatives," though Sindler campaigned on his support for an increase in the minimum wage and stricter growth management laws, while Williams focused on education and the environment. The Sentinel once again endorsed Sindler, noting, "He shows promise of being a champion of excellent schools, environmental protection and other good causes." Sindler ended up narrowly defeating Williams, receiving 51% of the vote to Williams' 49%. During his first term in the legislative, Sindler was pushed by Republican legislators and statewide anti-abortion groups to switch parties due to his conservative voting record and opposition to abortion, but declined to do so.

Sindler was re-elected without opposition in 1990. In 1992, following the reconfiguration of the state's legislative districts, Sindler ran for re-election in the 38th District, which contained most of the territory that he had previously represented, and expanded slightly to include several Mount Dora precincts in Lake County. He faced Republican nominee Mike Birdsong, a former legislative aide, and Libertarian nominee Mike Miller, a military veteran, in the general election. Sindler campaigned on his legislative record, in which he passed legislation to improve the state's prison system and to help address water quality in lakes. During the campaign, Birdsong criticized Sindler for working to create the Lake Apopka Habitat Restoration and Management Board, which critics argued "would add an unneeded level of bureaucracy." The Sentinel once again endorsed Sindler, criticizing Birdsong as "disappointing" and Miller as "way-out." The Sentinel, while noting that Sindler had been "too low key," praised him for his "worthwhile contributions" in the legislature. Sindler won his third term by a wide margin, receiving 53% of the vote to Birdsong's 43% and Miller's 4%. In 1994, Sindler was challenged for re-election by Republican nominee Sunny Rinker, a businesswoman and the widow of a television anchor. He was endorsed by the Sentinel, which praised him as a "legislative mechanic...working industriously to make the engine of government run properly." Ultimately, Sindler secured a fourth term against Rinker by a wide margin, winning 54% of the vote to her 46%.

When Sindler ran for re-election to his fifth and final term in the legislature in 1996, he was opposed in the Democratic primary by Carl Neidhart, a computer science instructor at the University of Central Florida. Sindler emphasized his legislative record and campaigned on his support for public education, criminal justice reform, and economic development, while Neidhart focused on his support for environmental protection. The Sentinel endorsed Sindler for re-election, noting that while he took some "disappointing" positions in the legislature, he "ably represented his constituents," and his opponent was "not a viable option for voters." He won the Democratic primary in a landslide, receiving 84% of the vote to Neidhart's 16%.

At the start of Sindler's final term in the legislature, he voted for the Republican nominee for Speaker of the Florida House of Representatives, Daniel Webster (Florida politician), over the Democratic nominee, Buzz Ritchie, joining two other Democrats, George Crady and Bud Bronson, in doing so. In response, the House Democrats expelled Bronson, Crady, and Sindler from their caucus in a 42-6 vote.

== Orange County Commission ==
In 1998, rather than seek re-election to the House, Sindler opted to run for District 2 on the Orange County Commission. He faced former County Commissioner Tom Dorman, a Republican, and Glennie Mills, a Democrat, in the nonpartisan election. The Sentinel endorsed Sindler over Dorman and Mills, citing his "track record of political experience" and his "ability to work with lawmakers in both parties," while noting that his opponents "can't claim the same resume." Sindler ended up winning in a landslide, receiving 57% of the vote to Dorman's 29% and Mills' 13%.

Following Sindler's unopposed re-election in 2002, he was deployed to Afghanistan as an officer in the United States Army Reserve, where he first worked as a veterinary officer before serving as a liaison between the military and Afghan government officials. Sindler declined to ask the Governor to appoint a temporary replacement during his service, instead opting to run his office by using his aides as proxies and through email.

In 2006, Sindler initially announced that he would run once again for the State House in the 38th District, but ultimately withdrew from the race after failing to resign from his County Commission post under Florida's resign-to-run law.

== 2016 State Senate campaign ==
In 2016, Sindler announced that he would run for the Florida Senate in the 11th District, following incumbent State Senator Geraldine Thompson's decision to run for Congress. Sindler faced State Representative Randolph Bracy, environmental activist Chuck O'Neal, and former State Senator Gary Siplin in the Democratic primary, and placed fourth, receiving 8 percent of the vote.

== Controversy ==
In 2004, Sindler and his wife were arrested and charged with domestic battery. During an argument about their lawn, Sindler allegedly "made a rude comment to his wife," who threw a water bottle at him, prompting Sindler to punch her in the chest. Ultimately, charges were dropped against Sindler and his wife.
