= Seminole County Public Library System =

Public library system in Florida, United States

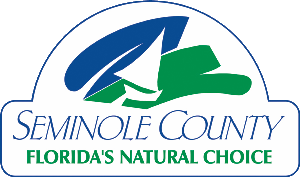
- Location: 215 N Oxford Rd, Casselberry, FL 32707
- Established: 1978
- Branches: 5

Collection
- Size: 500,000 volumes

Access and use
- Population served: 470,000 citizens

Other information
- Website: http://www.seminolecountyfl.gov/departments-services/leisure-services/seminole-county-library/

The Seminole County Public Library System is a public library system with five branches located in the cities of Casselberry, Sanford, Oviedo, Lake Mary, and Longwood, Florida. The Jean Rhein Central Branch (Casselberry) is located at 215 N Oxford Rd, Casselberry, FL 32707.

Each year, circulation approaches 2.5 million. All five branches are open 7 days a week and digital content is also accessible through their Virtual Library on the computer or mobile devices.

As of 2026, Seminole County Library has a seven-member Library Advisory Board that is appointed by the Board of County Commissioners who serve as a "general citizens' advisory board" and meet monthly to discuss issues relating to the Seminole County Public Library System.

== History ==
The League of Women Voters initiated the movement for a public library service in Seminole County. In 1974, a straw poll took place and citizens voted in favor of a countywide library system. The following year, Seminole County made a contract with the Orlando Public Library to operate the Casselberry and Sanford branches and start a bookmobile service. Seminole County residents had access to other services provided by the Orlando Public Library as well.

But in 1978, the Seminole County Public Library System was established through the Seminole County Board of Commissioners. They developed their own bookmobile program, expanded the Casselberry branch, and established administrative and technical support units.

Between 1979 and 1980, a library advisory board was created so citizens had a way to give input and feedback on library services and development. The Friends of the Library, a non-profit organization, was also established to provide support, financially or otherwise, to the library system. Volunteers from the Friends group operate a bookstore on the ground floor of the Casselberry branch. Items for sale, including books, DVDs, and magazines, are donated, and profits benefit the library system.

In 1982, a referendum vote was held that approved the expansion of the library system "by issuance of $7,000,000 in Library Bonds" which was used in part to build the North Branch in Sandford and the construction of other branches. It was believed this was possible because of the county's population growth as a result of Disney World and Epcot Center.

The same year, a books-by-mail program began, serving citizens over the age of 65 and those unable to travel to the library. The program was federally funded due to the Library Services and Construction Act. Today it is called the Homebound Mail Service. An application must be submitted with a physician's signature before service takes place.

In 1983, the Library Automation Project begins with the cataloging and interlibrary loan of materials by the Southeastern Library Network and the Online Computer Library Consortium.

In 1986, the construction of five new facilities and the renovation of the branch in Sanford commences. They are completed within the next couple years.

Seminole County Public Library implemented the Library/Day Care Connection program in 1991. This program was created to promote reading and library usage in children who were enrolled in day care. It received the National Association of Counties (NACo) Library Achievement Award in 1994.

The final phase of the Library Automation Project is completed in 1993, with the installation of the new library catalog that patrons can access.

In 1994, the magazines and periodicals indexes and inventory are added to the library catalog and the Library is awarded a Spanish Language Collection Development Grant for the purpose of acquiring children and adult books in Spanish. Library hours increased from 58 to 64 hours per week due to efficiency gains from automation program.

The Seminole County Homepage was created on the World Wide Web in 1996.

On March 5, 1998, the Casselberry branch was renamed the Jean Rhein Central Branch Library in honor of the founding director of the Seminole County Library System, who retired in December 1997.

== Awards ==
The SCPL was selected as the winner of the 2025 Florida Library Association's (FLA) Library of the Year Award. The FLA cited that the decision was made from taking into consideration the library's STEAM-related youth programs, high summer participation during the Summer Reading Program with young patrons, and various adult programs.

They were also selected as the winner of the 2025 Florida Library Association's Innovative Program or Service Award from their "'“Amazing Race'-style challenge" called The Great Seminole County Adventure where the library system partnered with various museums throughout Seminole County to encourage community engagement with local museums.

== Plans for the Future ==
The SCPL System has a four-year strategic plan and a ten-year long-range plan. Their mission, as stated in the long-range plan, is "Enriching Lives, Engaging Minds, Empowering Community." This plan is approved and supported by both the Library Advisory Board and the local Friends of the Library chapter.

A new Long Range Master Plan was released in 2023 that discussed current library plans for the next ten years from 2023 - 2033. Some of the contents discussed included adding new 35,000 square foot library branches to help with the growing population of the county and close some of the gaps between branches and populated areas, creating more staffing opportunities and be staffed at full strength, building upon their Spanish language collection to meet the needs of the Spanish-speaking community, consider adding makerspaces, and gaining more access to state-of-the-market technology that is commonplace in other library systems of this size. This plan was prepared by Godfrey’s Associates, Inc., a library consulting firm who have created similar plans for other libraries.

== Branches ==
Seminole County Public Library branches

Jean Rhein Central Branch
215 N. Oxford Road, Casselberry, Florida 32707
East Branch
310 N. Division Street, Oviedo, Florida 32765
North Branch
150 N. Palmetto Avenue, Sanford, Florida 32771
Northwest Branch
580 Green Way Boulevard, Lake Mary, Florida 32746
West Branch
245 N. Hunt Club Boulevard, Longwood, Florida 32779

All branches schedule children, adult and family programs, including storytimes, Library Explorers, tween and teen events, book clubs, and arts and crafts. Events vary from branch to branch. Current programs can be viewed by visiting the library events calendar .

3D printing services are offered at all five branches for all library card holders. Submit 3D printing requests here.

== See also ==
- Altamonte Springs City Library, a non-SCPL municipal library in Altamonte Springs, Seminole County, Florida
