= Bryan Nelson =

American politician (born 1958)

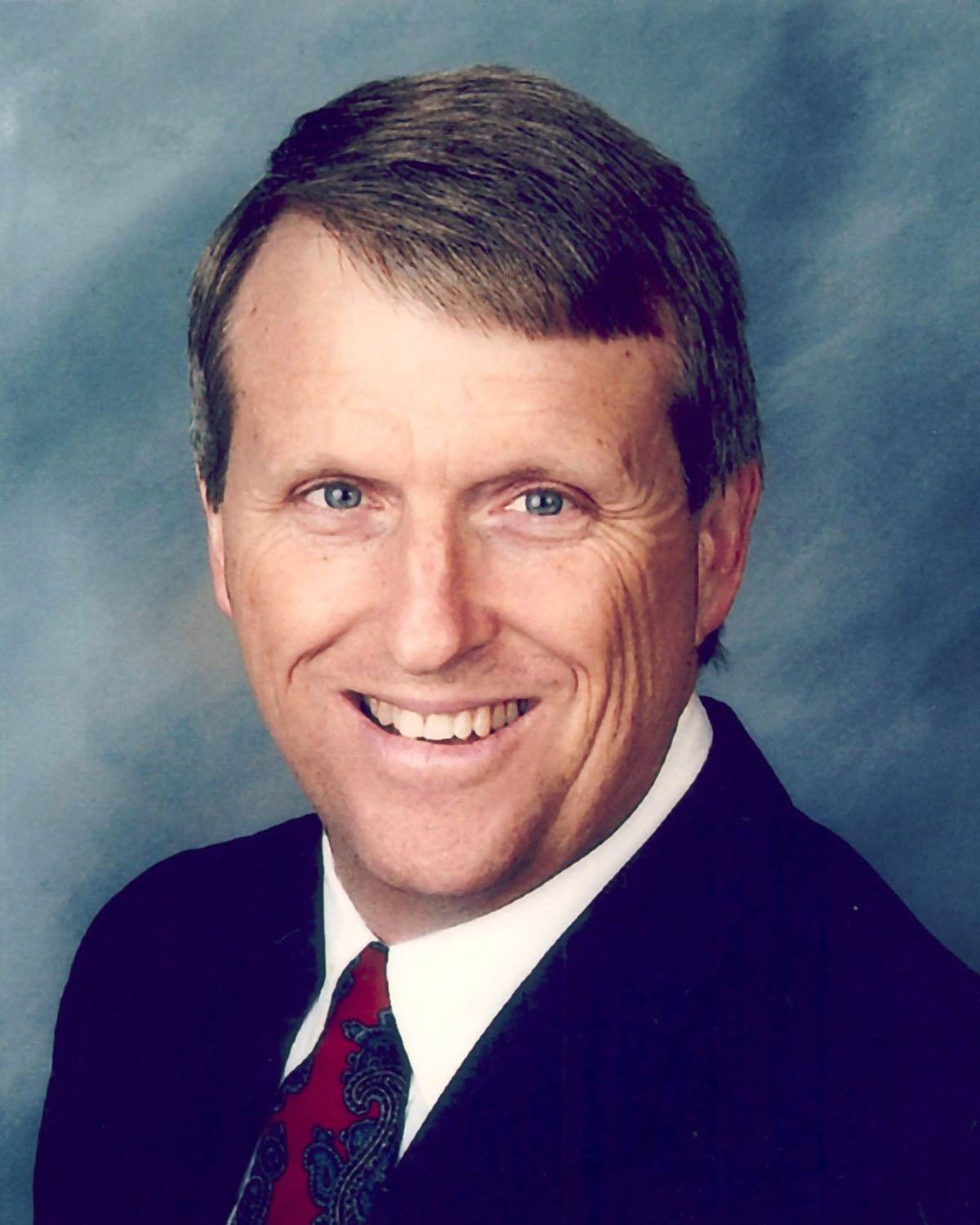

Mayor of Apopka
- Incumbent
- Assumed office April 24, 2018
- Preceded by: Joe Kilsheimer

Member of the Orange County Commission from the 2nd district
- In office November 18, 2014 – April 24, 2018
- Preceded by: Fred Brummer
- Succeeded by: Rod Love

Member of the Florida House of Representatives
- In office November 7, 2006 – November 4, 2014
- Preceded by: Fred Brummer
- Succeeded by: Jennifer Sullivan
- Constituency: 38th district (2006–2012); 31st district (2012–2014)

Personal details
- Born: September 14, 1958 (age 67) Orlando, Florida
- Party: Republican
- Education: University of Florida (BS)
- Profession: Insurance agent

Bryan Nelson (born September 14, 1958) is a Florida-based politician, serving as Mayor of Apopka since 2018. A Republican, he was a member of the Florida House of Representatives, representing the 31st District, which includes the cities of Apopka, Eustis, Mount Dora, Tavares, and Umatilla in northern Lake County and northern Orange County, since 2012. He served on the Orange County Commission for District 2 from 2014 until March 2018 when he won election for mayor of Apopka after support for the previous mayor deteriorated.

== History ==
Nelson was born in Orlando and attended the University of Florida, where he graduated with a degree in ornamental horticulture in 1979. After graduation, he returned to Central Florida, where he worked in his family's business, Nelson's Florida Roses. Nelson then started Nelson Insurance Services in 1995 as a means of providing his family's business with insurance, and it expanded from there. In 2002, he was appointed to the Orange County Planning and Zoning Commission, and served as its chairman in 2006.

== Florida House of Representatives ==
When incumbent State Representative Fred Brummer was unable to seek another term in the legislature and instead opted to run for the Orange County Commission, Nelson ran to succeed him in the 38th District, which was based in northern Orange County, stretching from Apopka to Ocoee, Orlando, and Maitland. He won the Republican primary and the general election entirely uncontested. In 2008, he faced his first opponents: Lonnie Thompson, the Democratic nominee, and Lawrence Fisher, an independent candidate. The Orlando Sentinel endorsed Thompson over Nelson, observing, "[H]e better appreciates the important issues facing the district than does his opponent," and criticizing Nelson for not protecting the Wekiva River and for not supporting property-insurance reforms. Despite this fact, Nelson won his second term over Thompson by a solid margin of victory, winning 54% of the vote to Thompson's 43% and Fisher's 3%. When Nelson ran for a third term in 2010, he did not face a Democratic opponent, but instead a member of the Florida Tea Party, James Heinzelman. Nelson ran on a platform of "repealing parts of SB 550, which would impose a five-year inspection schedule on septic tanks," which he said would lead to a "bureaucratic and costly nightmare" and on supporting SunRail, which Heinzeilman vocally opposed. Ultimately, Heinzelman did not prove to be a significant challenge for Nelson, and he won re-election with 82% of the vote. In 2012, when the legislative districts were redrawn, Nelson was moved into the 31st District, which, like his previous district, was based in Apopka, but unlike his previous district, stretched into northern Lake County and won re-election to his fourth term entirely unopposed.

== Orange County Commission ==
In 2013, Nelson announced that he would run for the Orange County Commission in District 2 to replace term-limited Commissioner Fred Brummer, whom he previously replaced in the legislature. He defeated his Democratic opponent, Eatonville Vice Mayor Alvin Moore, in the general election.

== Mayor of Apopka ==
Nelson ran for mayor of Apopka in 2018, and defeated incumbent Joe Kilsheimer. He was re-elected in 2022.

=== Salary controversy ===
Upon taking office in 2018, Nelson reduced the mayoral salary from $150,000 to $75,000, fulfilling a campaign pledge. On October 2, 2019, the Council voted to set the mayor’s salary at $127,000, effective November 1, 2019. Nelson abstained from the vote, but in comments after the meeting, said he would take the salary. In 2020, the Orlando Sentinel editorial board criticized the increase, describing it as a reversal of Nelson’s earlier cost-cutting pledge.

=== Fire chief incident ===
In 2022, firefighter Austin Duran died after trying to move a sand trailer, which the Apopka Fire Department said was used for hazard spills. At a December 2022 briefing, Nelson said the trailer involved “should never have been in service,” noting that it had been in use for more than 20 years. He reported that only one violation was found in the investigation — a lack of required training for using the trailer. An audit after the incident recommended several changes to the fire department's safety protocols, as well as culture changes and new training for firefighters.

Resignations followed Duran's death. After the firefighter union voted in favor of a no-confidence motion in then-fire chief Sean Wylam, he retired.

=== City attorney resignation and censure ===
Michael Rodriguez, Apopka's city attorney, also resigned after Duran's death, saying that he could no longer represent the city ethically. Rodriguez said during the city commission meeting where he resigned that "I’m tendering my resignation so I can save you some money." Commissioners later alleged that for weeks after the resignation, they were misled about Rodriguez's employment status with the city by Nelson. Nelson said that these claims were untrue, and that Rodriguez had been working from home to assist with the transition. Nelson was censured by commissioners unanimously on August 3, 2023.
