= Altamonte Mall =

Shopping mall in Altamonte Springs, Florida, United States

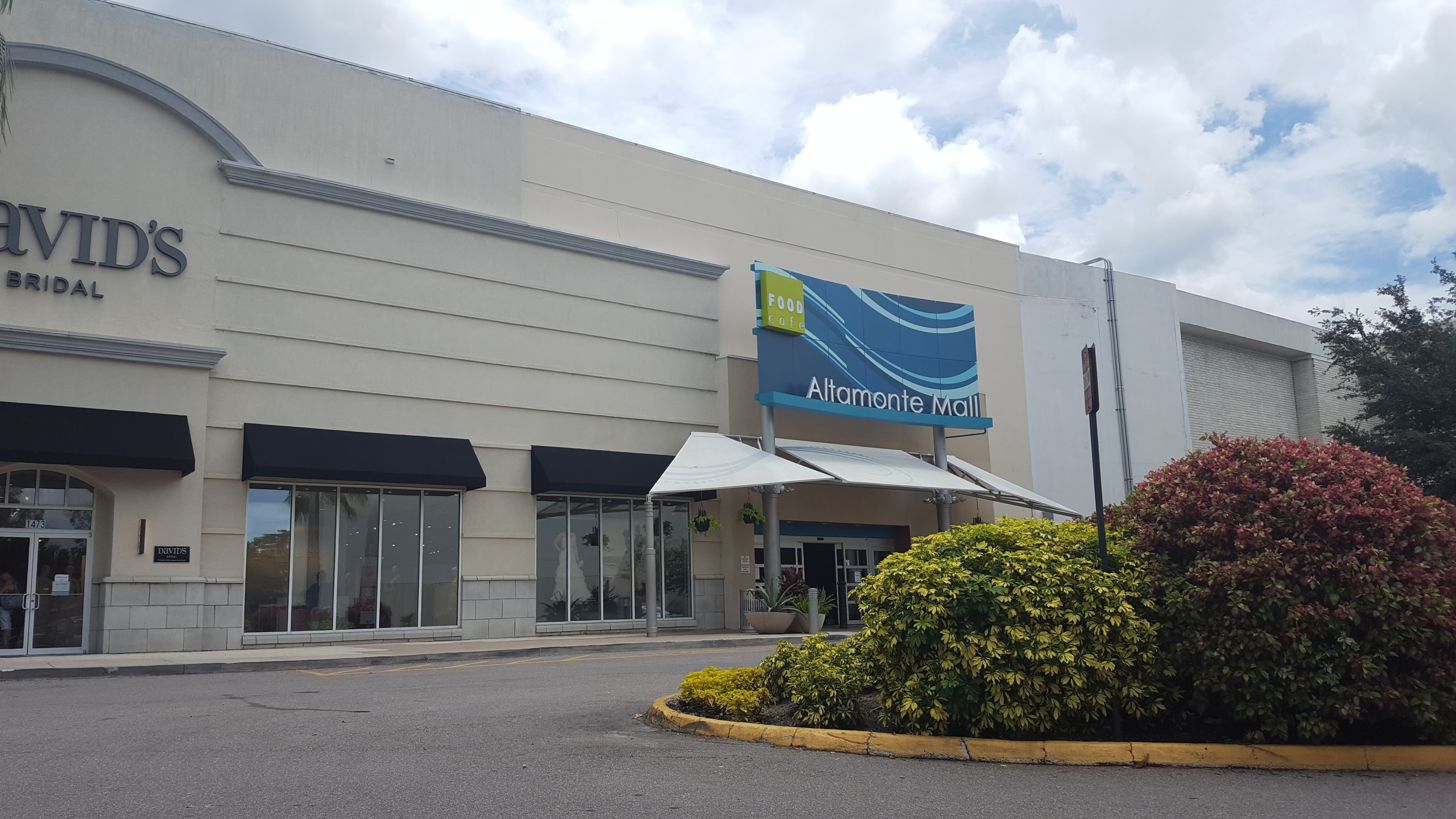
- Southwest entrance to Altamonte Mall (2017)
- Location: Altamonte Springs, Florida, United States
- Coordinates: 28.666996°N 81.3777479°W
- Address: 451 East Altamonte Drive (SR 436)
- Opened: August 1, 1974; 52 years ago
- Renovated: 1989, 2003, 2017
- Developer: Edward J. DeBartolo Corporation and Homart Development Company
- Manager: GGP
- Owner: GGP
- Num. of stores: 130
- Num. of anchor tenants: 4 (1 vacant)
- Floor area: 1,159,255 square feet (107,698.3 m^{2})
- Floors: 2
- Parking: 5,700 spaces
- Public transit: LYNX: 436N; CraneRIDES
- Website: altamontemall.com

Altamonte Mall is a super-regional shopping mall located in Altamonte Springs, Florida, United States, a suburb of Orlando. The mall is located in the city's Uptown Altamonte neighborhood near the intersection of Interstate 4 and State Road 436. It is anchored by Dillard's, JCPenney, Macy's, and an 18-screen AMC multiplex.

At 1.16 million square feet (108,000 m^{2}), the two-story mall is the largest enclosed shopping mall in Seminole County and the third largest in Central Florida, behind The Mall at Millenia and The Florida Mall.

== History ==
=== Planning and opening ===
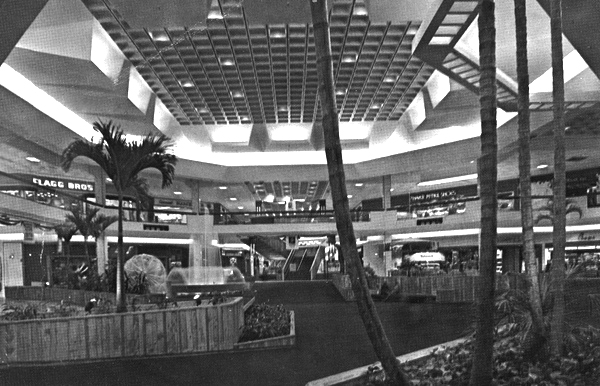
Original center court (1974)

In the early 1970s, mall developer The Edward J. DeBartolo Corporation announced two large projects in the Central Florida area: one south of Orlando (which became The Florida Mall) and another north of Orlando in the suburb of Altamonte Springs, with the Altamonte project scheduled for construction first. Both malls were to be co-developed alongside the Homart Development Company, the real-estate arm of department store Sears, Roebuck and Co.

Altamonte Mall opened on August 1, 1974, with Sears, Robinson's of Florida, Burdines, and Jordan Marsh as its anchors, as well as a two-screen General Cinema theater on an outparcel. At opening, the mall was the largest in the state of Florida.

In 1984, Homart sold its share in the mall. In 1987, Robinson's sold its Florida locations, including Altamonte Mall's, to New Orleans-based Maison Blanche.

=== First renovation ===
In 1988, DeBartolo announced a $7.2 million renovation to the mall, adding new ceilings, skylights, floors, and landscaping, as well as a brightly-colored "Old Florida" theme and a bell tower façade. A grand re-opening was held on November 4, 1989, and a food court was opened on the second floor the following August. After the renovation was complete, permits were filed for a 500,000-square-foot (46,000 m^{2}) expansion containing two additional department stores and a four-story parking garage, but no construction took place.

In 1991, Jordan Marsh's parent company, Allied Stores, was merged with fellow department store conglomerate Federated Department Stores. Since Federated already owned Burdines, Altamonte Mall's Jordan Marsh store was closed and sold to JCPenney, which opened the following January. At the same time, Maison Blanche was bought out by Mercantile Stores and merged into their Mobile-based Gayfers chain.

In 1992, DeBartolo sold its stake in the mall to Rodamco due to financial difficulties, though it continued to manage the mall. In 1998, the mall was purchased by General Growth Properties for $169 million. The same year, Gayfers parent Mercantile Stores was acquired by Dillard's, and the Altamonte Mall store was converted accordingly.

=== Second renovation ===
The General Cinema theater was closed in 2000 amidst negotiations to construct a new megaplex. A new 18-screen theater, operated by AMC Theatres, opened in June 2003 alongside two three-story parking garages. Concurrent with the new theater, the mall underwent a renovation that remodeled the central court and food court, softened the mall's color palette, and replaced the bell tower with a 26,000-square-foot (2,400 m^{2}) Barnes & Noble store.

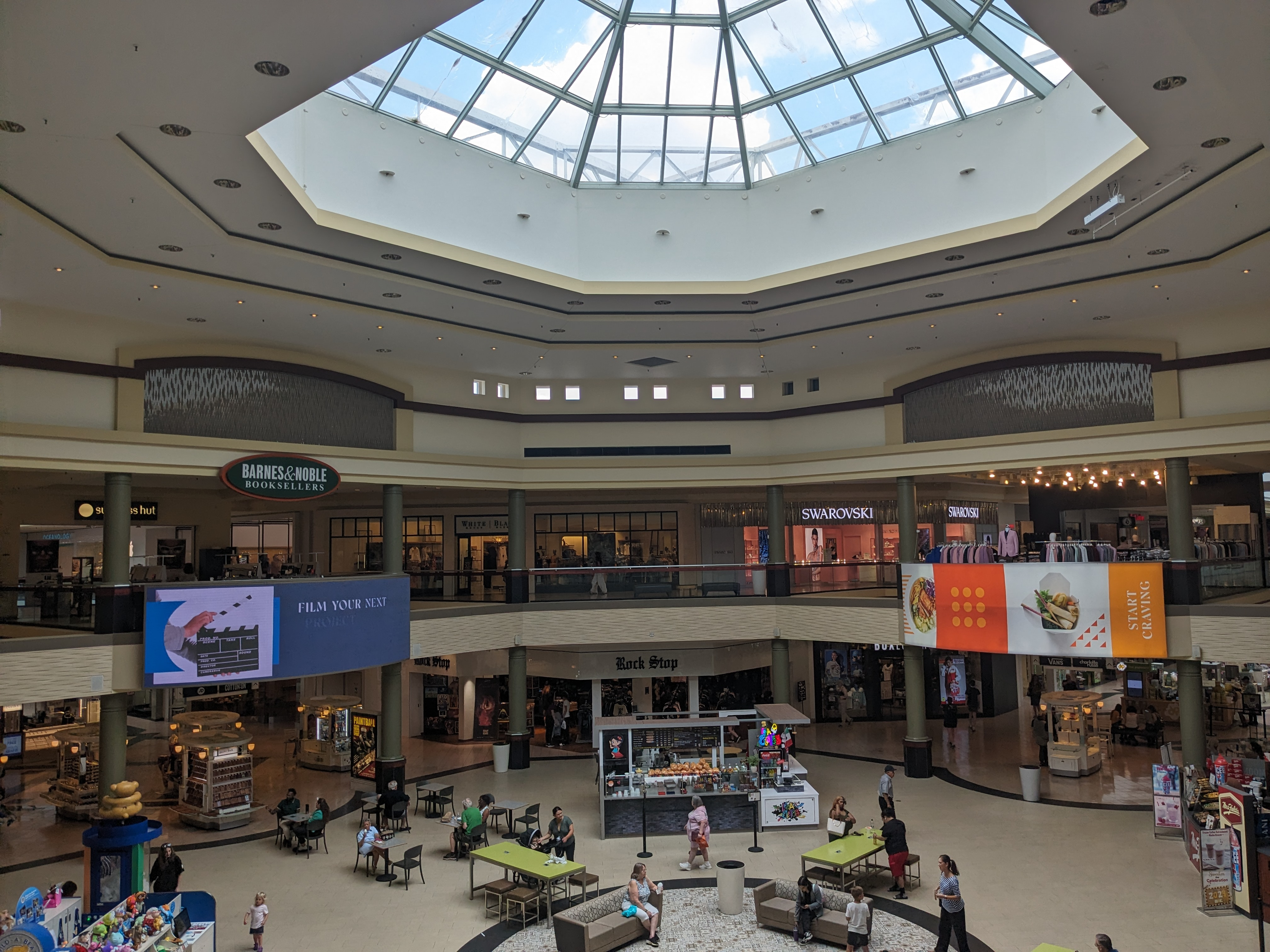
Modern central court (2024)

In 2004, Federated Department Stores announced plans to merge its department store chains, including Burdines, under its flagship Macy's chain. The merger was completed the following year.

The Sears anchor (and accompanying Sears Auto Center) closed in August 2018. As of 2026, the anchor building has never been reopened.

In 2017, the mall renovated its central court, replacing its fountain with seating and retail kiosks.

In 2025, the mall opened seven new stores, including Old Navy and Pop Mart.

In 2026, the mall opened five new retail stores between July and October. The mall added Gold King jewelry store, Moida, an arcade, Miss A, and a Sushi Burrito restaurant.
