= Walter Sims =

Walter Sims may refer to:

- Walter Sims (Georgia politician) (1880–1953), mayor of Atlanta
- Walter Sims (Florida politician) (1923–2011), member of the Florida House of Representatives

== See also ==
- Walter Symes (1852–1914), Liberal Party Member of Parliament in New Zealand
