= Fred Brummer =

American politician (1945–2023)

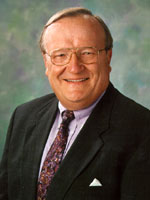

Member of the Orange County Commission from the 2nd district
- In office November 21, 2006 – November 18, 2014
- Preceded by: Bob Sindler
- Succeeded by: Bryan Nelson

Member of the Florida House of Representatives from the 38th district
- In office November 3, 1998 – November 7, 2006
- Preceded by: Bob Sindler
- Succeeded by: Bryan Nelson

Personal details
- Born: October 28, 1945 Babylon, New York
- Died: May 1, 2023 (aged 77) Apopka, Florida
- Party: Republican
- Spouse: Catherine A. "Cathi" Anderson
- Education: Florida Atlantic University (B.S., M.B.A.)
- Occupation: Accountant

Frederick C. Brummer (October 28, 1945 – May 1, 2023) was a Republican politician from Florida who served as a member of the Florida House of Representatives from the 38th district from 1998 to 2006 and as a member of the Orange County Commission from 2006 to 2014.

== Early life ==
Brummer was born in Babylon, New York, in 1945, and moved to Florida in 1957. He attended Florida Atlantic University, graduating with his bachelor's degree in business administration in 1968 and his masters of business administration in 1974. Brummer moved to Apopka in 1981, where he founded an accounting firm, Brummer & Rogers.

== Florida House of Representatives ==
In 1998, when Democratic State Representative Bob Sindler ran for the Orange County Commission, Brummer ran to succeed him in the 38th district. He faced Geraldine Ferris and George Collins in the Republican primary, and defeated both, winning the nomination with 53 percent of the vote. Because no other candidates filed for the seat, Brummer won by default, flipping control of the seat to the Republican Party.

Brummer ran for re-election in 2000, and was challenged by Democrat Jerry Girley, a social worker and pastor. The Orlando Sentinel endorsed Brummer, noting that though "he stumbled badly" at the beginning of his legislative service and had a "rocky start," he was "a quick study." Brummer defeated Girley by a narrow margin, winning 51 percent of the vote to Girley's 49 percent.

In 2002, Brummer ran for a third term, and faced Democrat Jim Martin, an accountant. He defeated him by a wide margin, winning re-election with 63 percent of the vote. Brummer ran for a fourth and final term in 2004, and was opposed by Democrat Joshua Stagner, a former university administrator who recently moved into the district. He won 59 percent of the vote to Stagner's 41 percent.

== Orange County Commission ==
Brummer was unable to seek re-election in 2006 because of term limits, and instead ran to succeed Sindler on the Orange County Commission from the 2nd district. He faced three opponents in the nonpartisan primary: UCF instructor George Collins, attorney Lawrence Colin, and businessman Gary Metzger. Brummer won the election outright, receiving 54 percent of the vote and avoiding a runoff election.

In 2010, Brummer ran for re-election, and was challenged by Bruce Birkrem, a retired auto parts company owner. Brummer defeated Birkrem in a landslide, winning 75 percent of the vote.

Brummer was term-limited in 2014, and was succeeded by Bryan Nelson. In 2018, when Nelson decided to run for mayor of Apopka rather than seek re-election, Brummer ran to succeed him. However, he placed third in the primary behind school board member Christine Moore, who had previously served as Brummer's campaign manager, and Patricia Rumph.

== Death ==
Brummer died on May 1, 2023.
