= Senator Sims =

Senator Sims or Simms may refer to:

- Betty Sims (1935–2016), Missouri State Senate
- Freddie Sims (born 1950), Georgia State Senate
- Frederick W. Sims (1862–1925), Virginia State Senate
- Kathleen Sims (1942–2019), Idaho State Senate
- Leonard Henly Sims (1807–1886), Arkansas State Senate
- W. Timothy Simms (born 1943), Illinois State Senate
- Walter Sims (Florida politician) (1923–2011), Florida State Senate
- William H. Sims (American politician) (1837–1920), Mississippi State Senate
- William P. Sims (1875–1951), Arizona State Senate

== See also ==
- Daniel Symmes (1772–1817), Ohio State Senate
- Steve Symms (born 1938), U.S. Senator from Idaho from 1981 to 1993
