= Jennifer Sullivan (politician) =

American politician

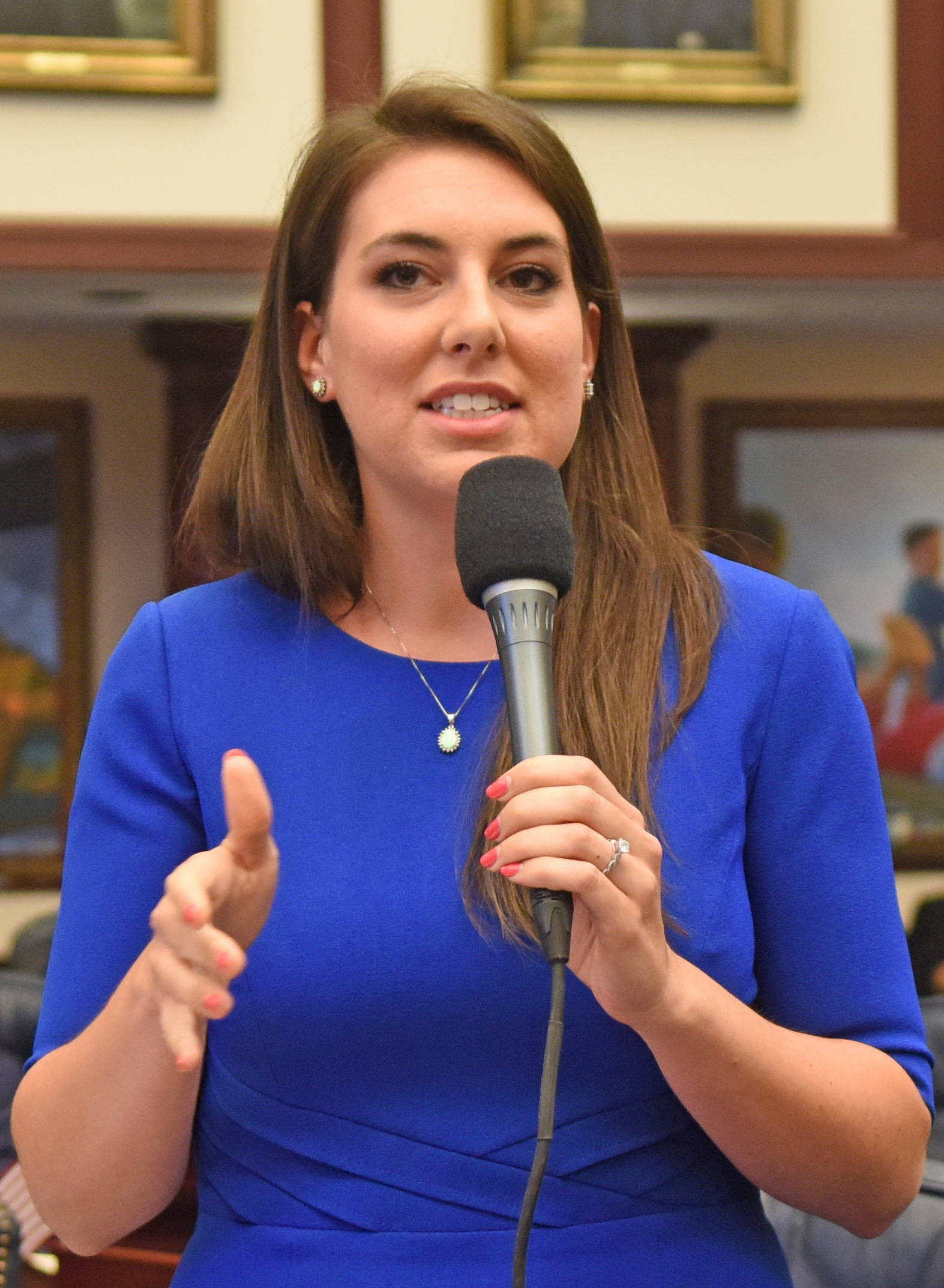

Member of the Florida House of Representatives from the 31st district
- In office November 4, 2014 – November 3, 2020
- Preceded by: Bryan Nelson
- Succeeded by: Keith Truenow

Personal details
- Born: August 1, 1991 (age 35) Altamonte Springs, Florida
- Party: Republican
- Parent: Patricia Sullivan
- Education: Liberty University
- Profession: Youth development leader

Jennifer Mae Sullivan (born August 1, 1991) is a Republican politician from Florida. She served three terms in the Florida House of Representatives from 2014 to 2020, representing the 31st District, which includes Apopka, Eustis, Mount Dora, Tavares, and Umatilla in northern Lake County and northern Orange County.

== Early life and career ==
Sullivan was born and raised in Altamonte Springs, Florida, where she was home-schooled. Sullivan claimed that she completed half the credits at Liberty University towards a degree. However, the registrar of the university says Sullivan was enrolled for a single semester in 2011. She has held a number of jobs, including working at a blueberry farm, as a waitress, and as a babysitter, and campaigned for Amendment 2, an ultimately successful constitutional amendment to ban gay marriage in Florida in 2008, and for her mother, Patricia Sullivan, who unsuccessfully ran for the Congress in the Republican primary in 2010 in the 8th congressional district.

== Florida House of Representatives ==
In 2014, incumbent State Representative Bryan Nelson was term limited and Sullivan ran to succeed him. She faced Randy Glisson, Terri Seefeldt, Belita Grassel, and Joseph Stephens in the Republican primary, which was an open primary because no other candidates had filed. Sullivan campaigned on her conservative Christian credentials, and attracted support from a number of young volunteers from other states who traveled down to Florida to work on her campaign. The Orlando Sentinel endorsed Grassel, criticizing Sullivan in an editorial for being "steeped in tea-party dogmatism that has contributed to polarized governance." Sullivan narrowly won, defeating Glisson by a little more than one thousand votes, winning 35% of the vote to Glisson's 29%, Seefeldt's 19%, Grassel's 14%, and Stephens's 3%, making her the youngest female member of the Florida House in its history.

In November 2016, Sullivan was re-elected with 73% of the vote.

On March 7, 2018, Sullivan voted yes on SB 7026, establishing waiting periods for firearms purchases and raising the minimum age to purchase a firearm from 18 to 21. Sullivan previously promoted her 2014 "AQ" rating from the NRA Political Victory Fund. In 2016, the Orlando Sentinel reported that Sullivan distributed campaign literature stating she was a "protector of your 2nd Amendment rights." According to Sullivan's profile, hunting is a hobby.

Sullivan decided not to run for reelection in 2020 to focus on family.

== See also ==
- Florida House of Representatives
