= Paul H. Cheney =

American academic (1945–2025)

- Born: Paul Henry Cheney; November 6, 1945; Minneapolis, Minnesota, U.S.
- Died: August 18, 2025 (aged 79); Altamonte Springs, Florida, U.S.
- Education: University of Minnesota; State University of New York
- Occupation: Academic

Paul Henry Cheney (November 6, 1945 – August 18, 2025) was an American academic. He was a distinguished professor at the University of Central Florida.

Cheney died in Altamonte Springs, Florida, on August 18, 2025, at the age of 79.
