= Majesty Building =

Incomplete office building in Altamonte Springs, Florida

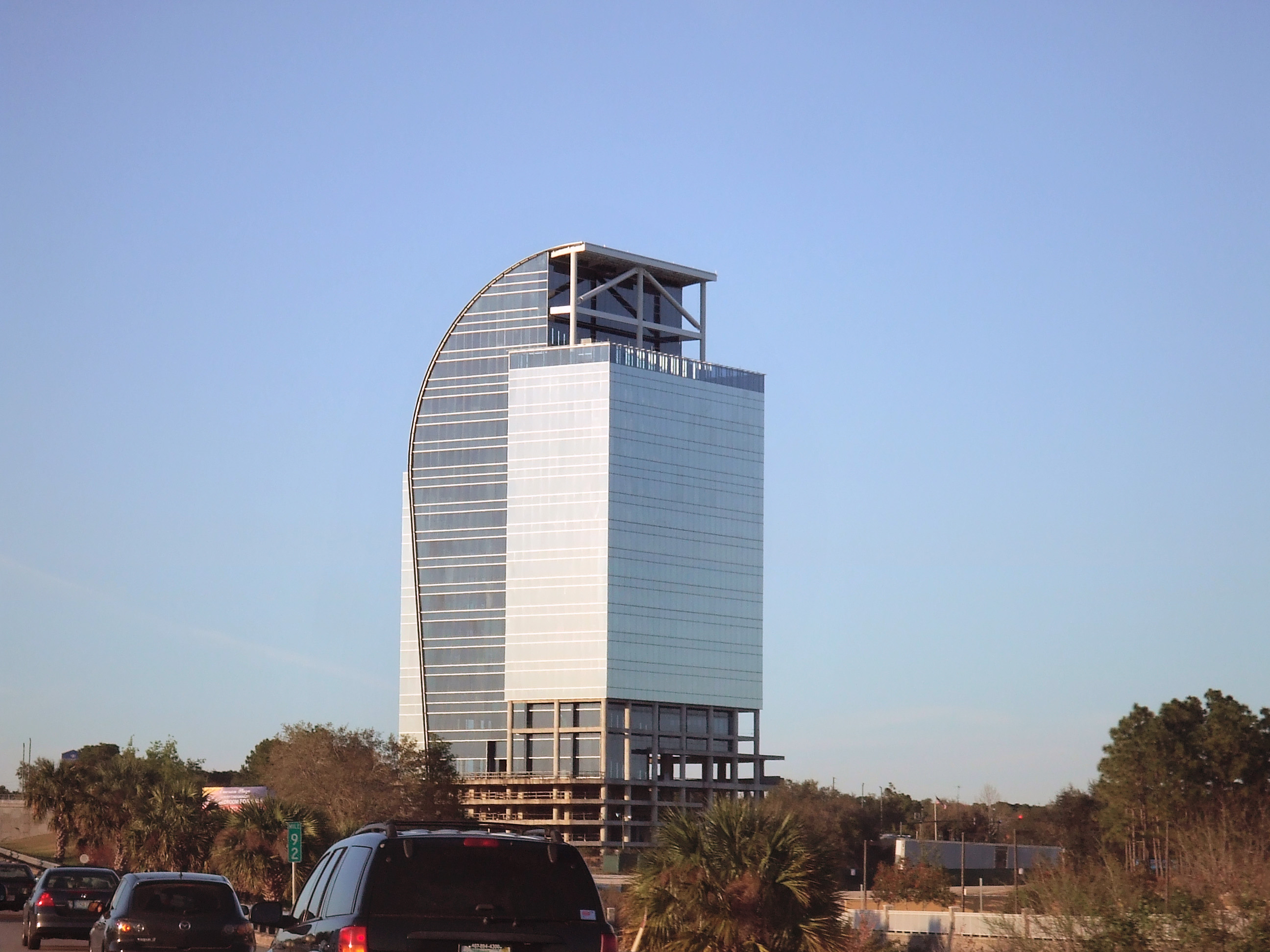
- Building with incomplete lower floors (2008)

- Location within Florida

General information
- Type: Office
- Location: 123 East Central Parkway; Altamonte Springs, Florida; United States
- Coordinates: 28.6720447°N 81.387237°W
- Owner: Associated Christian Television System

Height
- Roof: 293 ft (89.3 m)

Technical details
- Floor count: 18
- Floor area: 300,000 sq ft (27,871 m^{2})

The Majesty Building is an incomplete office building in Altamonte Springs, Florida. The 18-story, 300,000-square-foot (27,871 m^{2}) structure is being constructed by the religious broadcaster Associated Christian Television System, owner of the SuperChannel 55 television station. If completed, it would be the tallest building in Seminole County.

Construction of the building began in May 2001 with a planned completion date of February 2003. However, due to funding issues and the owner's desire to avoid debt financing, the building was never fully completed. Construction has continued sporadically, but as of September 2025 there is no planned completion date.

Due to its proximity to Interstate 4 and towering appearance, the building is widely known as the I-4 Eyesore or Eyesore on I-4.

== History ==
The building was commissioned by Claud Bowers, CEO of the religious independent TV station SuperChannel 55 (WACX). The building was intended to hold WACX's headquarters and broadcast studios, as well as leasable office, retail, and conference space. The project was estimated to cost $40 million, which Bowers planned to raise without taking on debt.

Construction began in May 2001. However, in October 2002, construction was halted due to a lack of funds. A fundraiser for WACX stated that the building would be continued in stages as more money was raised. At the time, only a 14-story concrete frame had been completed. In 2005, glass panels were installed on the sides of the frame. In 2010, Bowers announced plans to open the tower in 2012, but this did not occur.

Construction resumed in 2018, which led to the completion of the glass shell, the structure's five-story parking garage, and some interior lighting.

In June 2025, SuperChannel filed paperwork to develop the building's first floor, which will contain its production studios and leasable office space, by the end of the year. The building's upper floors were not included in the plan. The city of Altamonte Springs granted tentative approval for the development, welcoming signs of progress.

== See also ==
- Construction delay – Situation where construction starts or concludes later than expected
- Development hell – Term for media projects stuck in development
