= Fred B. Hagan =

American politician (1931–2007)

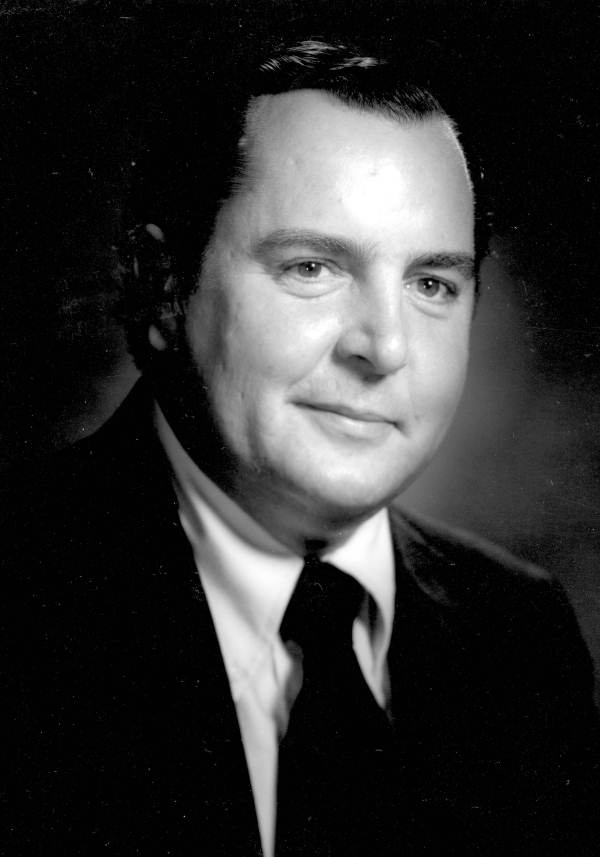
- Hagan in 1974

Member of the Florida House of Representatives from the 41st district
- In office 1972–1976
- Preceded by: Walter Sims
- Succeeded by: Fran Carlton

Personal details
- Born: December 16, 1931 Shamokin, Pennsylvania, U.S.
- Died: November 18, 2007 (aged 75)
- Party: Republican
- Education: Lafayette College; University of Miami

Fred B. Hagan (December 16, 1931 – November 18, 2007) was an American politician. He served as a Republican member for the 41st district of the Florida House of Representatives.

== Life and career ==
Hagan was born in Shamokin, Pennsylvania. He attended Lafayette College and the University of Miami.

In 1972, Hagan was elected to represent the 41st district of the Florida House of Representatives, succeeding Walter Sims. He served until 1976, when he was succeeded by Fran Carlton.

Hagan died on November 18, 2007, at the age of 75.
