= David Smith (Florida politician) =

American politician

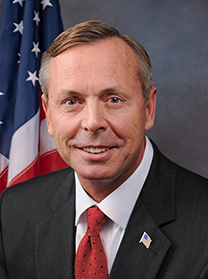
- Official portrait, 2013

Member of the Florida House of Representatives
- Incumbent
- Assumed office November 6, 2018
- Preceded by: Jason Brodeur
- Constituency: 28th district (2018–2022); 38th district (2022–present)

Personal details
- Born: David Allen Smith; March 17, 1960 (age 66) Aberdeen, Maryland, U.S.
- Party: Republican
- Education: Texas A&M University (BBA); Florida Institute of Technology (MS)
- Occupation: Business consultant
- Website: http://www.electsmith28.com

Military service
- Allegiance: United States of America
- Branch/service: United States Marine Corps
- Years of service: 1984–2012
- Rank: Colonel
- Commands: Naval Air Systems Command
- Battles/wars: Iraq War

David Allen Smith (born March 17, 1960) is an American politician and retired United States Marines Colonel. A Republican, he has served in the Florida Legislature representing the state's 38th district in the Florida House of Representatives since 2022, and previously served its 28th district from 2018 to 2022.

== Political career ==
Smith defeated Democrat Lee Mangold in the November 6, 2018 general election, winning 51.27% of the vote.

== Military career ==
David Smith graduated from Texas A&M University in 1982 with a bachelor's degree in Business Management and was commissioned as a Second Lieutenant in the U.S. Marine Corps through the Naval Reserve Officer Training Corps (NROTC) program. While at Texas A&M he was a member of the Corps of Cadets and Company S-2 Marauders. After attending The Basic School at MCB Quantico, Virginia, he proceeded to NAS Pensacola and later NAS Whiting Field, Florida, for flight training and was designated a Naval Aviator in 1984.

Reporting to MAG-39, MCAS Camp Pendleton, California, Smith completed UH-1N helicopter pilot training and was assigned to [Marine Helicopter Light Attack Squadron 367 (HMLA-367) until 1990. During this period, he served in numerous squadron Operations, Logistics and Maintenance billets and completed two deployments to Okinawa, Japan and one WESTPAC deployment aboard the USS Tarawa (LHA-1) while attached to Marine Medium Helicopter Squadron 163 (HMM-163), 11th MEU (SOC) as a Weapons and Tactics Instructor (WTI).

In 1990, Smith was reassigned to Marine Helicopter Training Squadron 303 (HMT-303), the Marine Corps’ H-1 helicopter Fleet Replacement Squadron (FRS), as a UH-1N Instructor Pilot, where he also served as the squadron's Assistant Operations Officer and Director of Safety and Standardization. As the designated NATOPS Evaluator for the H-1 FRS, he also had the additional responsibility of being the UH/HH-1N Model Manager. He supervised significant updates to the NATOPS manual due to aircraft configuration changes and also to pilot and crew chief emergency procedure checklists.

During his career he flew more than 4,500 accident free flight hours and was a designated Weapons and Tactics Instructor (WTI). He made six extended deployments overseas or aboard ship, including a combat tour flying in Operation Iraqi Freedom.

He had Command assignments or Program Management responsibility for three separate billion-dollar programs, with his final Marine Corps assignment as Program Manager, Training Systems (PM TRASYS), leading a military and civilian workforce adjacent to Naval Support Activity Orlando at the Central Florida Research Park in Orlando, Florida that managed $1.4 billion worth of Marine Corps modeling, simulation & training (MS&T) projects.

After 30 years of service, David retired from the Marine Corps at the rank of Colonel.

== Personal life ==
Smith worked in the private sector of Central Florida's Simulation & Training industry from 2010 to 2018.

David lives in Winter Springs and is active in community affairs. He is a Paul Harris fellow at the Winter Springs Rotary Club, a member of the Seminole County Regional Chamber of Commerce, VFW Post 5405 and multiple other Veterans organizations and local non-profit groups. He is a member of Leadership Orlando class #78 and Leadership Seminole class #26. David is a member of CrossLife Church in Oviedo.
