= Fran Carlton =

American politician (born 1936)

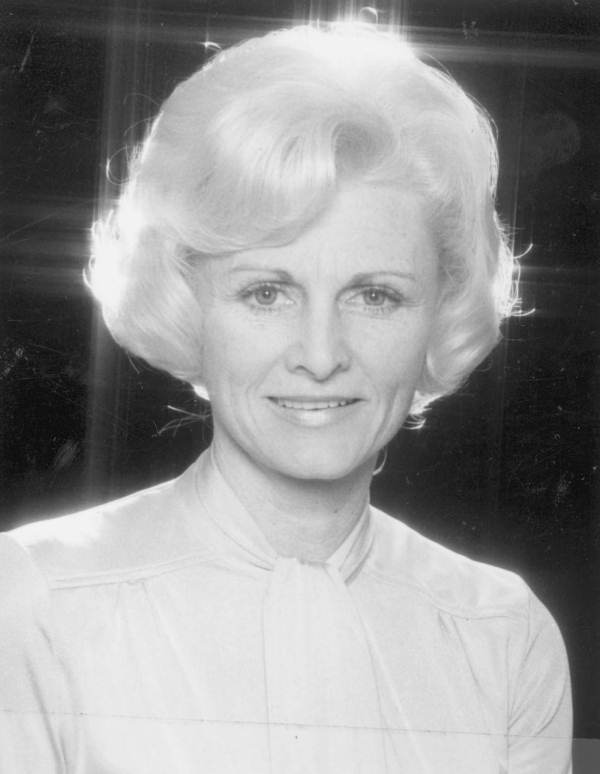
- Carlton in 1976

Member of the Florida House of Representatives from the 41st district
- In office 1976–1982
- Preceded by: Fred B. Hagan
- Succeeded by: Daniel Webster

Member of the Florida House of Representatives from the 39th district
- In office 1982–1988
- Preceded by: Daniel Webster
- Succeeded by: Robert B. Sindler

Personal details
- Born: January 19, 1936 (age 90) Steinhatchee, Florida, U.S.
- Party: Democratic
- Education: University of Florida; Stetson University

Fran Carlton (born January 19, 1936) is an American politician. She served as a Democratic member for the 39th and 41st district of the Florida House of Representatives.

== Life and career ==
Carlton was born in Steinhatchee, Florida. She attended the University of Florida and Stetson University.

In 1976, Carlton was elected to represent the 41st district of the Florida House of Representatives, succeeding Fred B. Hagan. She served until 1982, when she was succeeded by Daniel Webster. In the same year, she was elected to represent the 39th district, succeeding Webster. She served until 1988, when she was succeeded by Robert B. Sindler.
