= Altamonte Springs, Florida =

City in the United States

- City
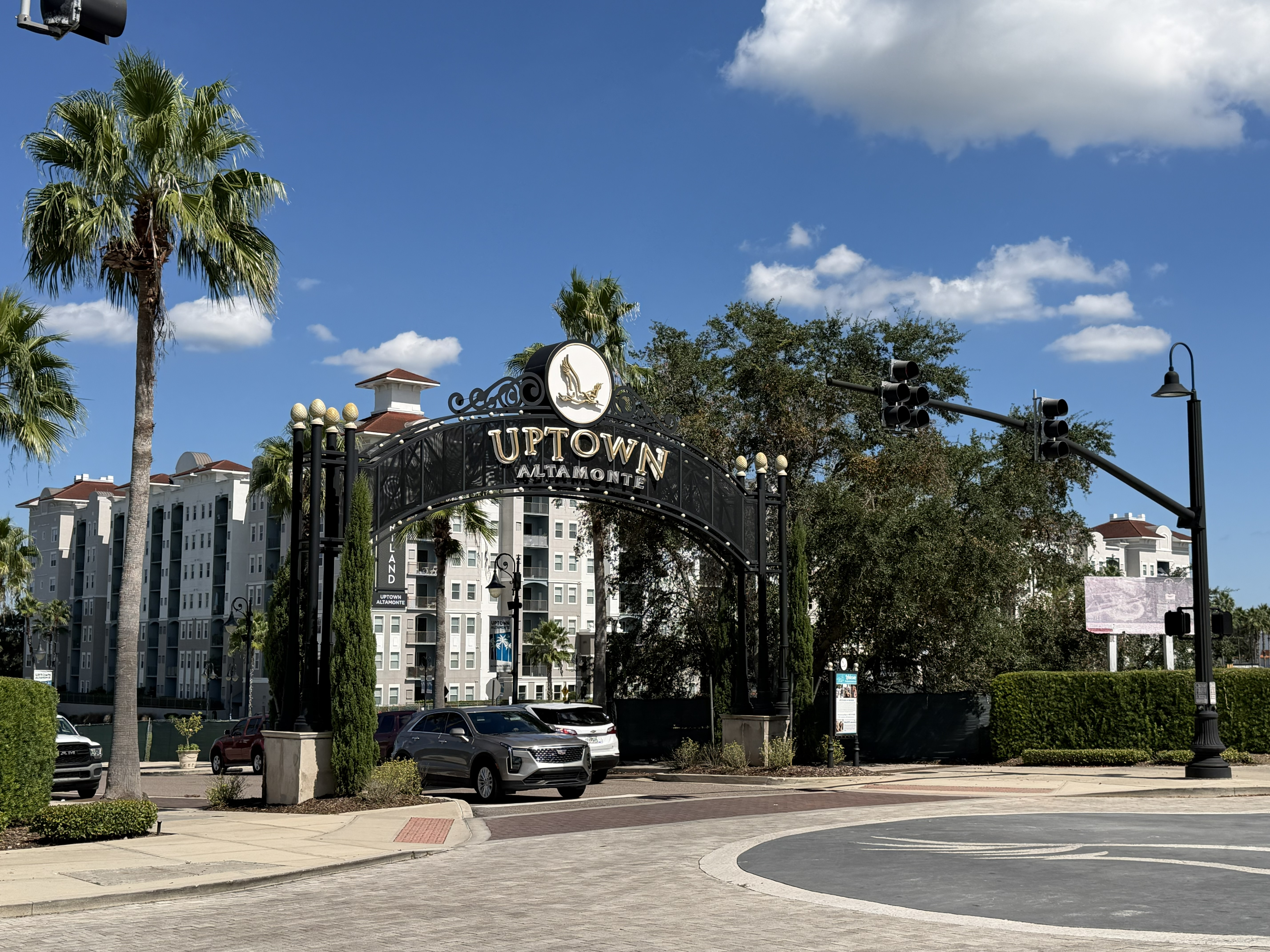
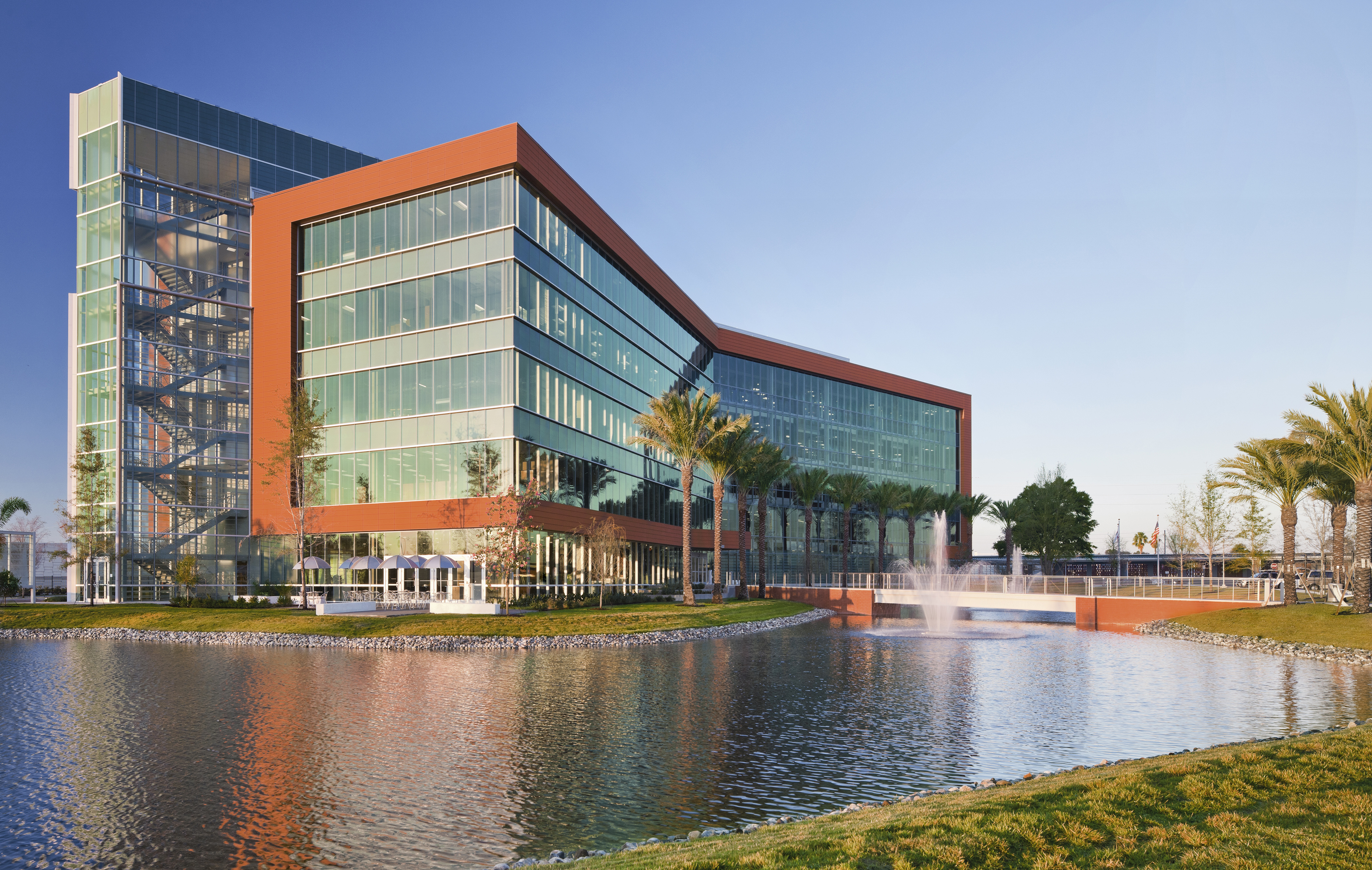
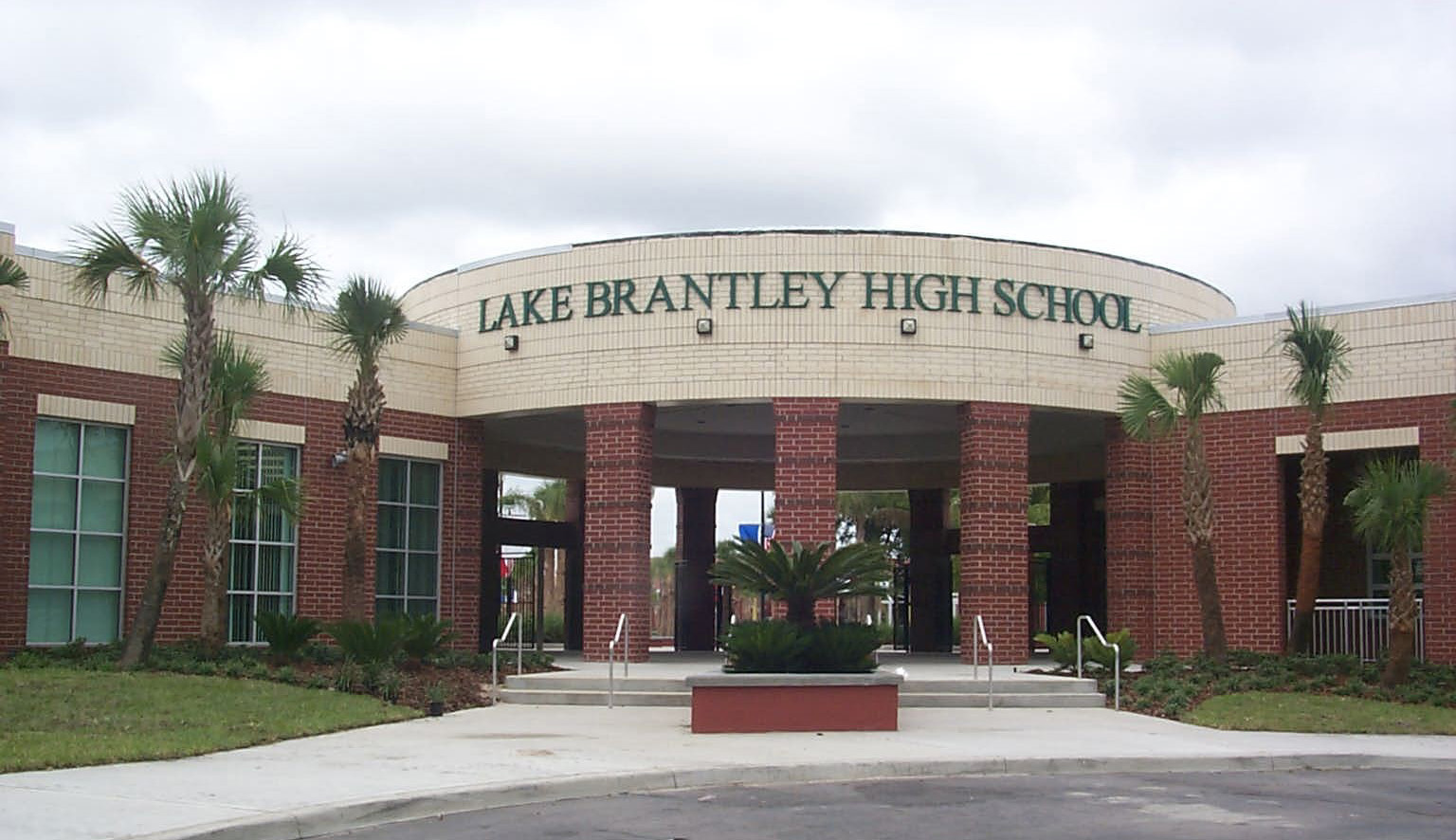
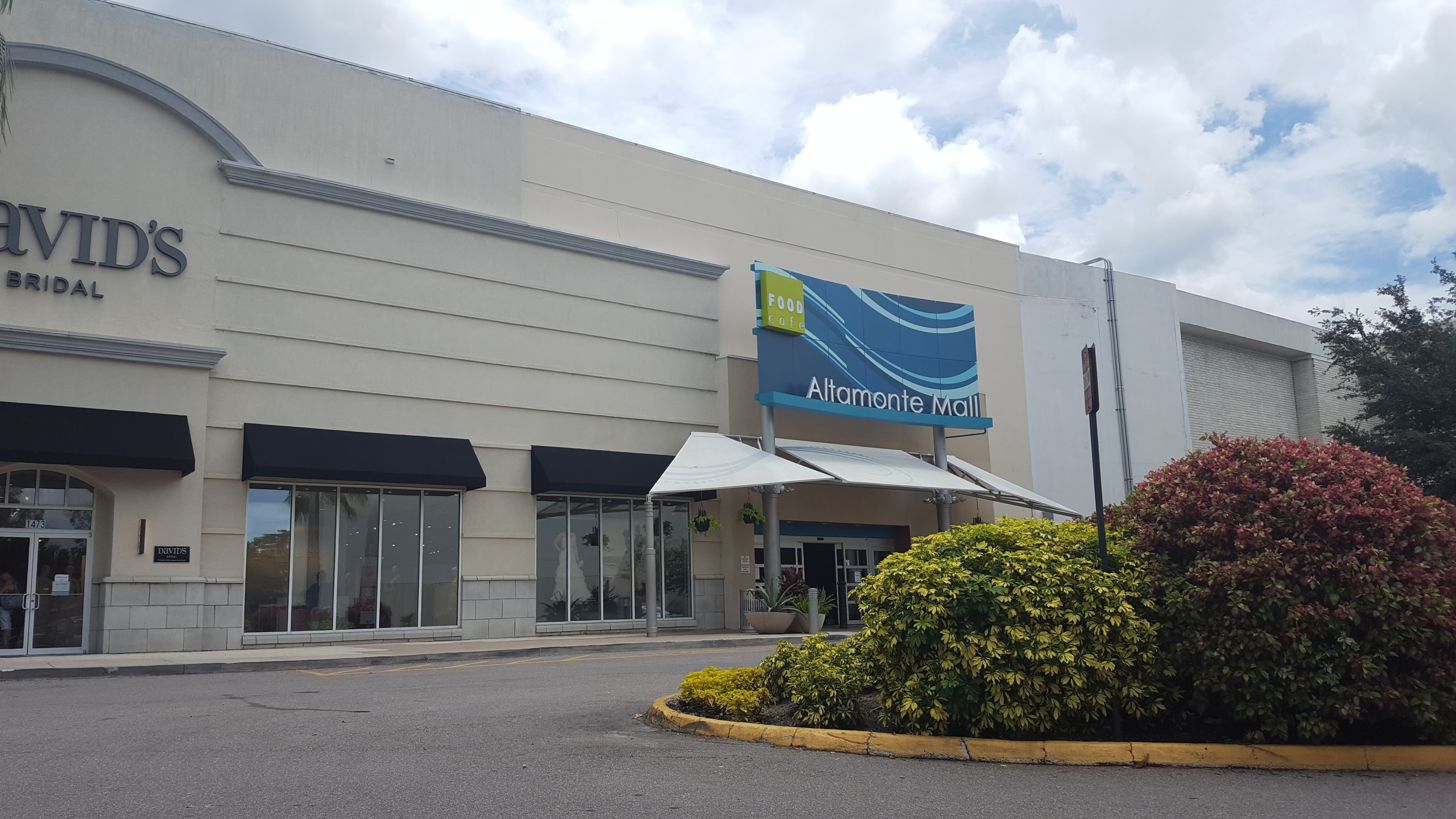
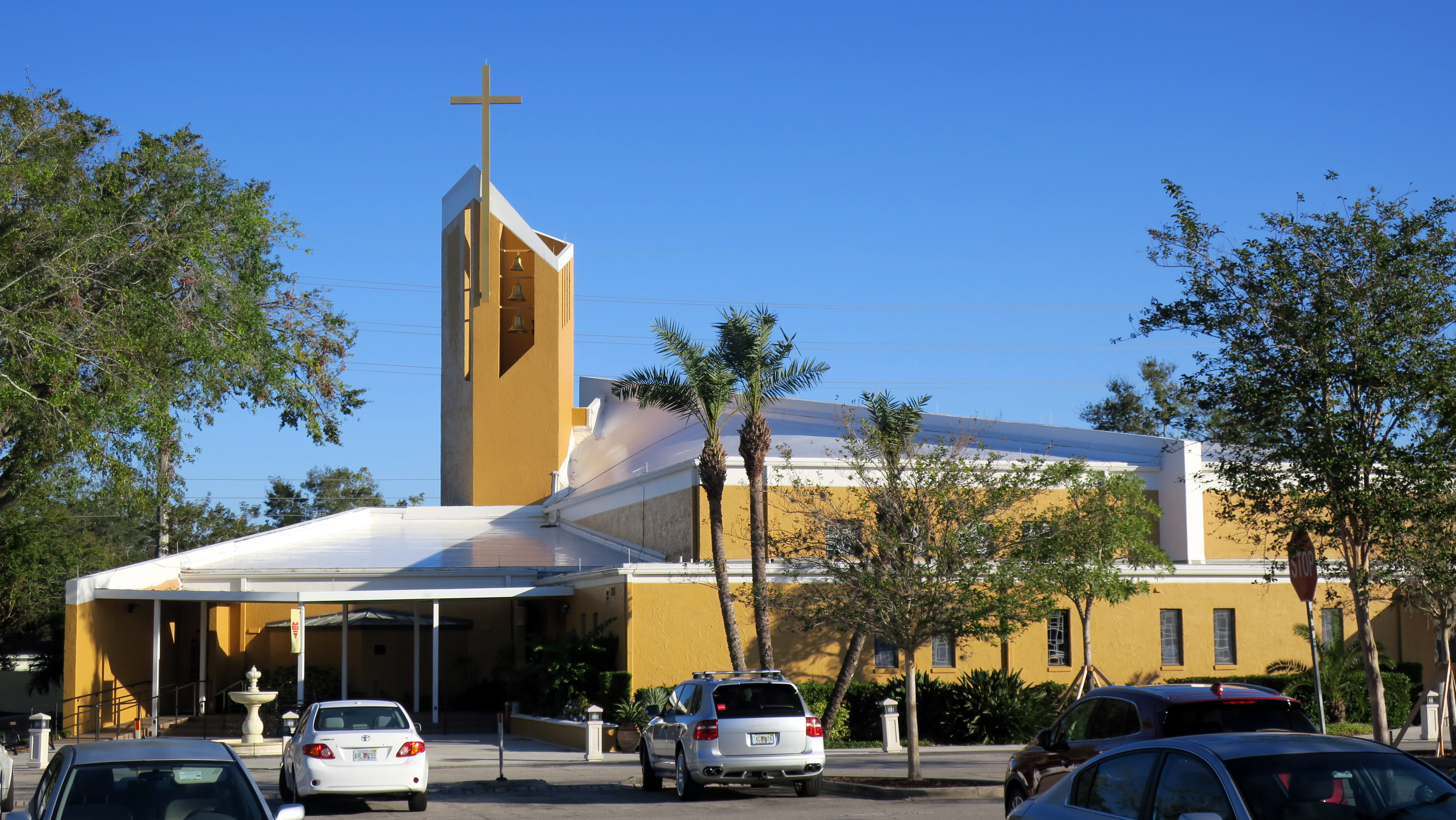
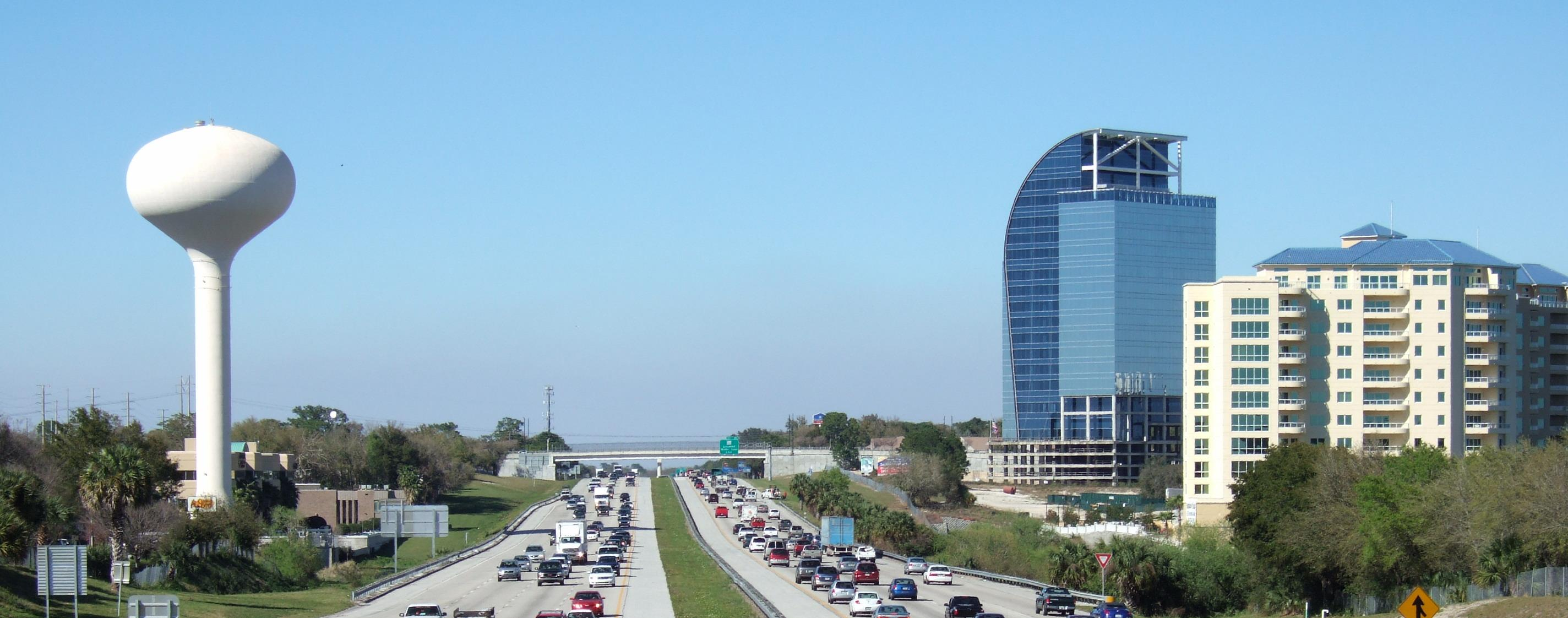
- Uptown Altamonte AdventHealth Lake Brantley High School Altamonte Mall St. Mary Magdalen Catholic Church Skyline of Altamonte Springs viewed from Interstate 4, with the unfinished Majesty Building in the background.

- Logo

- Location of Altamonte Springs in Seminole County, Florida.
- Coordinates: 28°39′38″N 81°22′45″W
- Country: United States
- State: Florida
- County: Seminole
- Settled: c. 1870
- Incorporated: November 11, 1920

Government
  - Type: Commission–Manager

Area
  - Total: 9.70 sq mi (25.13 km^{2})
  - Land: 9.10 sq mi (23.57 km^{2})
  - Water: 0.60 sq mi (1.56 km^{2})
- Elevation: 79 ft (24 m)

Population (2020)
  - Total: 46,231
  - Density: 5,080.8/sq mi (1,961.72/km^{2})
- Time zone: UTC−5 (Eastern (EST))
  - Summer (DST): UTC−4 (EDT)
- ZIP Codes: 32701, 32707, 32714, 32730, 32751
- Area codes: 407 and 689
- FIPS code: 12-00950
- GNIS feature ID: 2403089
- Website: www.altamonte.org

Altamonte Springs is a suburban city in Central Florida in Seminole County, Florida, United States, which had a population of 46,231 at the 2020 United States census. The city is in the northern suburbs of the Orlando–Kissimmee–Sanford Metropolitan Statistical Area, which the United States Census Bureau estimated had a population of 2,673,376 in 2020.

== History ==
Dr. Washington Kilmer of Cincinnati was the first person of European background to settle into the area circa 1870, and he named the area Altamonte. In 1882, the Altamonte Land, Hotel and Navigation Company, founded by Thomas C. Simpson and four other Massachusetts businessmen, gave the area its present name: Altamonte Springs.

The company developed the core community along Altamonte Avenue (today's SR 436) between Maitland and Longwood Avenues (today's Ronald Reagan Boulevard). On November 11, 1920, the residents of Altamonte Springs voted 38 to 7 in favor of incorporation.

== Geography ==
According to the United States Census Bureau, the city has a total area of 9.4 mi^{2} (24.5 km^{2}), of which 8.9 mi^{2} (23.1 km^{2}) is land and 0.6 mi^{2} (1.5 km^{2}) (5.93%) is water.

=== Climate ===
The climate in this area is characterized by hot, humid summers and generally mild winters. According to the Köppen climate classification, the City of Altamonte Springs has a humid subtropical climate zone (Cfa).

== Demographics ==
Historical population
Census	Pop.	Note	%±
1920	441		—
1930	281		−36.3%
1940	551		96.1%
1950	858		55.7%
1960	1,212		41.3%
1970	4,391		262.3%
1980	22,028		401.7%
1990	34,879		58.3%
2000	41,200		18.1%
2010	41,496		0.7%
2020	46,231		11.4%
U.S. Decennial Census; 2018 Estimate

=== Racial and ethnic composition ===
Altamonte Springs city, Florida – Racial and ethnic composition Note: the US Census treats Hispanic/Latino as an ethnic category. This table excludes Latinos from the racial categories and assigns them to a separate category. Hispanics/Latinos may be of any race.
Race / Ethnicity (NH = Non-Hispanic)	Pop 2000	Pop 2010	Pop 2020	% 2000	% 2010	% 2020
White alone (NH)	28,623	23,678	20,899	69.47%	57.06%	45.21%
Black or African American alone (NH)	3,795	5,288	7,042	9.21%	12.74%	15.23%
Native American or Alaska Native alone (NH)	118	94	92	0.29%	0.23%	0.20%
Asian alone (NH)	1,193	1,356	1,631	2.90%	3.27%	3.53%
Native Hawaiian or Pacific Islander alone (NH)	16	21	15	0.04%	0.05%	0.03%
Other race alone (NH)	112	116	308	0.27%	0.28%	0.67%
Mixed race or Multiracial (NH)	780	876	2,077	1.89%	2.11%	4.49%
Hispanic or Latino (any race)	6,563	10,067	14,167	15.93%	24.26%	30.64%
Total	41,200	41,496	46,231	100.00%	100.00%	100.00%

=== 2020 census ===
As of the 2020 census, Altamonte Springs had a population of 46,231. The median age was 36.7 years. 18.4% of residents were under the age of 18 and 15.6% of residents were 65 years of age or older. For every 100 females there were 86.9 males, and for every 100 females age 18 and over there were 83.4 males age 18 and over.

100.0% of residents lived in urban areas, while 0.0% lived in rural areas.

There were 21,101 households in Altamonte Springs, of which 24.5% had children under the age of 18 living in them. Of all households, 31.7% were married-couple households, 21.8% were households with a male householder and no spouse or partner present, and 37.0% were households with a female householder and no spouse or partner present. About 36.0% of all households were made up of individuals and 10.9% had someone living alone who was 65 years of age or older.

There were 22,990 housing units, of which 8.2% were vacant. The homeowner vacancy rate was 1.9% and the rental vacancy rate was 9.4%.

Racial composition as of the 2020 census
Race	Number	Percent
White	23,889	51.7%
Black or African American	7,615	16.5%
American Indian and Alaska Native	240	0.5%
Asian	1,685	3.6%
Native Hawaiian and Other Pacific Islander	25	0.1%
Some other race	4,367	9.4%
Two or more races	8,410	18.2%

=== 2010 census ===
As of the 2010 United States census, there were 41,496 people, 18,045 households, and 10,083 families residing in the city.

=== 2000 census ===
As of the census of 2000, there were 41,200 people, 18,821 households, and 10,012 families residing in the city. The population density was 4,631.1 inhabitants per square mile (1,788.1/km^{2}). There were 19,992 housing units at an average density of 2,247.2 per square mile (867.6/km^{2}). The racial makeup of the city was 79.23% White, 9.72% African American, 0.33% Native American, 2.94% Asian, 0.04% Pacific Islander, 4.79% from other races, and 2.94% from two or more races. Hispanic or Latino of any race were 15.93% of the population.

In 2000, there were 18,821 households, out of which 24.8% had children under the age of 18 living with them, 37.1% were married couples living together, 12.0% had a female householder with no husband present, and 46.8% were non-families. 36.1% of all households were made up of individuals, and 6.7% had someone living alone who was 65 years of age or older. The average household size was 2.17 and the average family size was 2.86.

In 2000, in the city, the population was spread out, with 20.4% under the age of 18, 10.8% from 18 to 24, 37.1% from 25 to 44, 21.0% from 45 to 64, and 10.7% who were 65 years of age or older. The median age was 34 years. For every 100 females, there were 92.6 males. For every 100 females age 18 and over, there were 89.6 males.

In 2000, the median income for a household in the city was $41,578, and the median income for a family was $49,082. Males had a median income of $34,413 versus $28,897 for females. The per capita income for the city was $23,216. About 5.6% of families and 7.4% of the population were below the poverty line, including 9.5% of those under age 18 and 6.4% of those age 65 or over.

== Government ==
Altamonte Springs has a city manager, city commissioner form of government (commission-manager), consisting of four commission districts and the mayor serving citywide.

== Education ==
The City of Altamonte Springs' public schools are a part of Seminole County Public Schools.

Altamonte Springs is served by 4 public elementary schools (K–5); 2 public middle school (6–8); and 2 public high school (9–12). The City of Altamonte Springs is also home to a branch of Seminole State College of Florida. Additionally, Altamonte Springs boasts 10 percent more college graduates per capita than the Florida average, and is just a few miles away from the University of Central Florida and Rollins College.

=== Elementary ===
- Altamonte Elementary School
- Forest City Elementary School
- Lake Orienta Elementary School
- Spring Lake Elementary School

=== Middle ===
- Milwee Middle School
- Teague Middle School

=== High ===
- Lake Brantley High School
- Lyman High School

=== Private ===
- Altamonte Christian School
- Annunciation Catholic Academy
- Forest Lake Academy
- Forest Lake Education Center
- Pace Brantley Hall School
- Saint Mary Magdalen School

=== College ===
- Everglades University
- Seminole State College of Florida

=== Library ===
Serving the needs of residents since 1960, the Altamonte Springs City Library houses a permanent collection of 44,000 items.

The city announced closure of the library on August 31, 2024 citing budget constraints and rising costs. Residents will be able to use the Seminole County Public Library. However, the city held a special meeting to discuss the library shutting down, and residents argued to commissioners that the library should not shut down and is vital to the city.

== Community ==
=== Cranes Roost Park and Uptown Altamonte ===
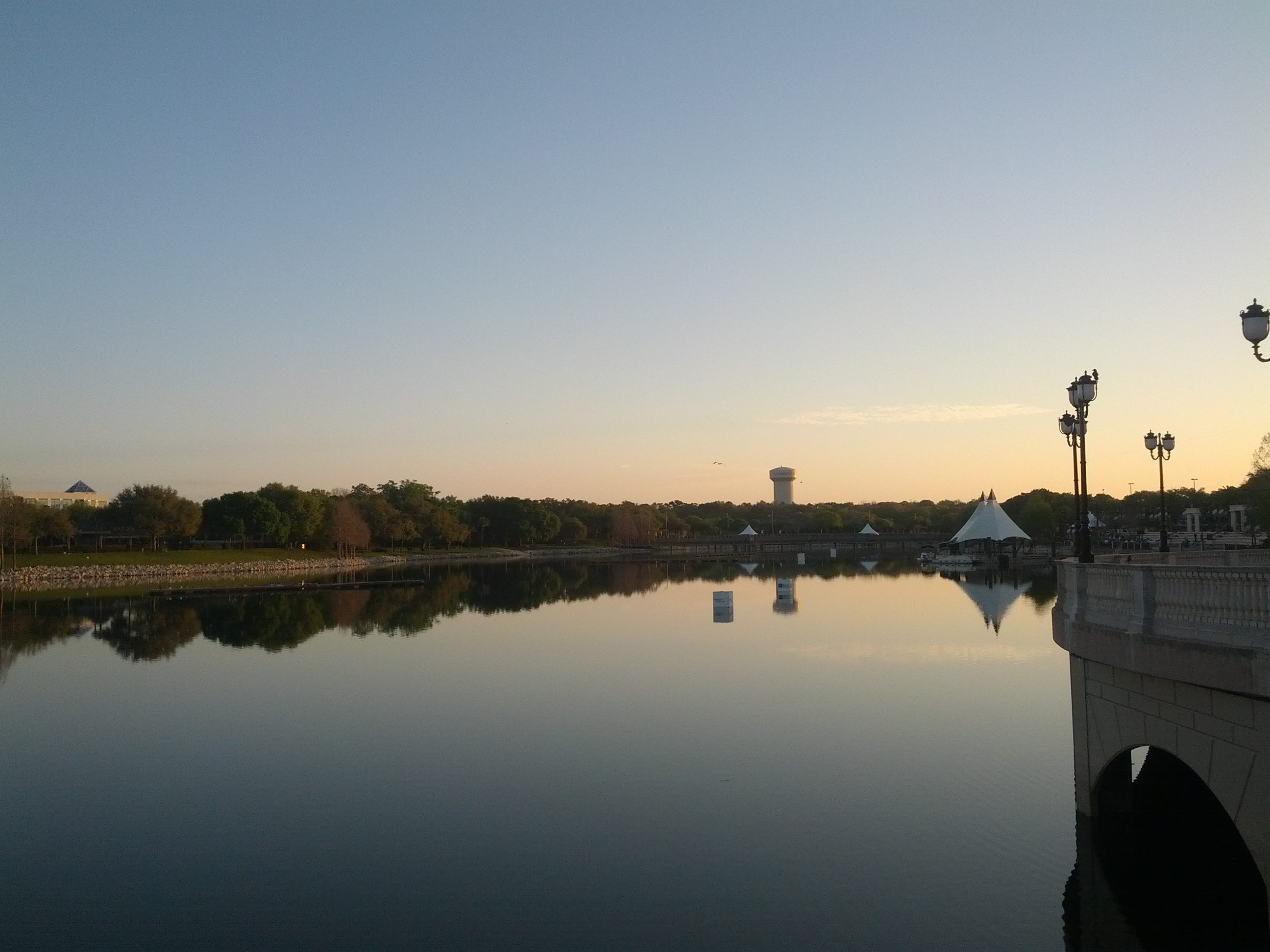
Cranes Roost Park

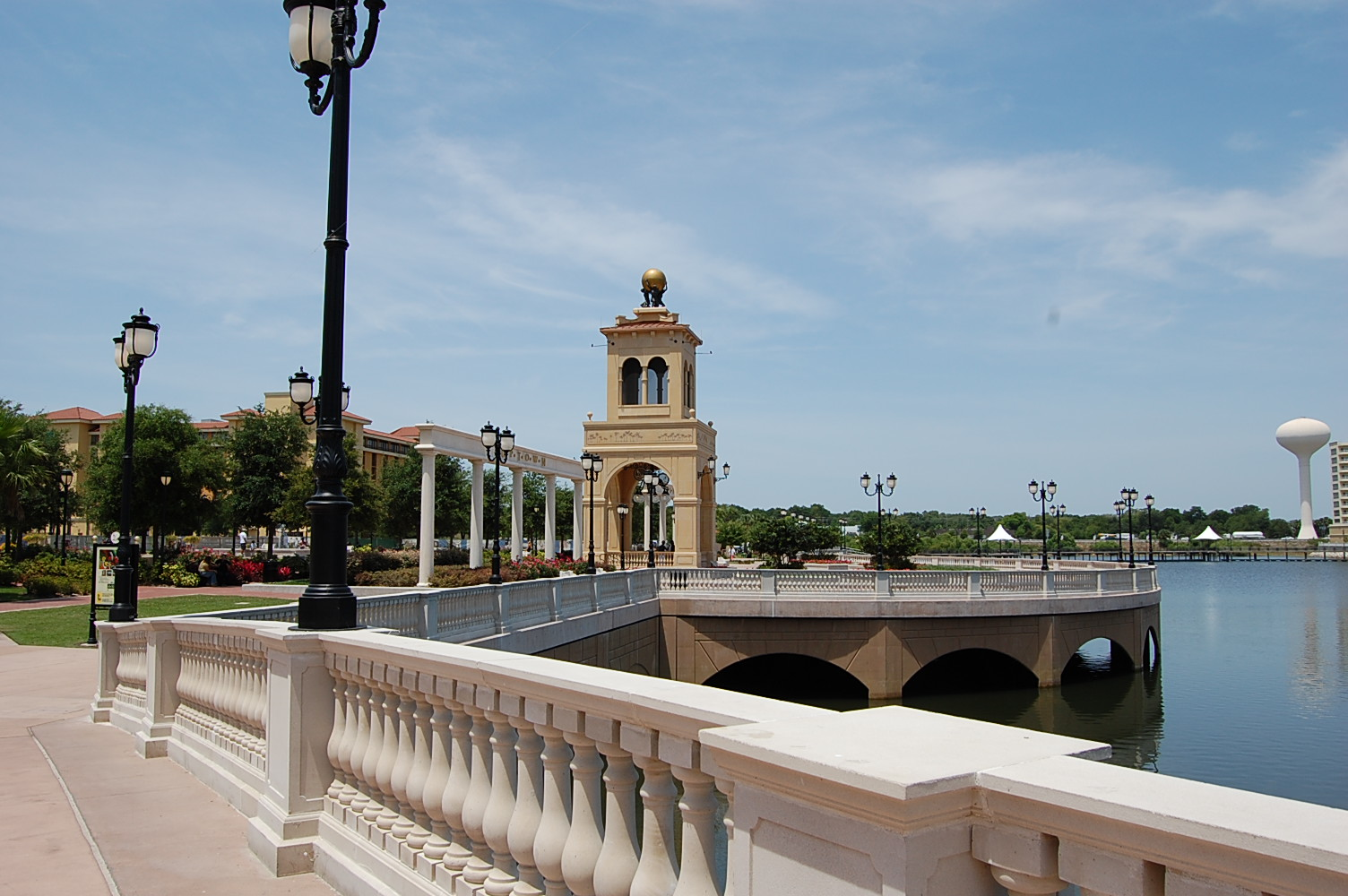
Uptown Altamonte

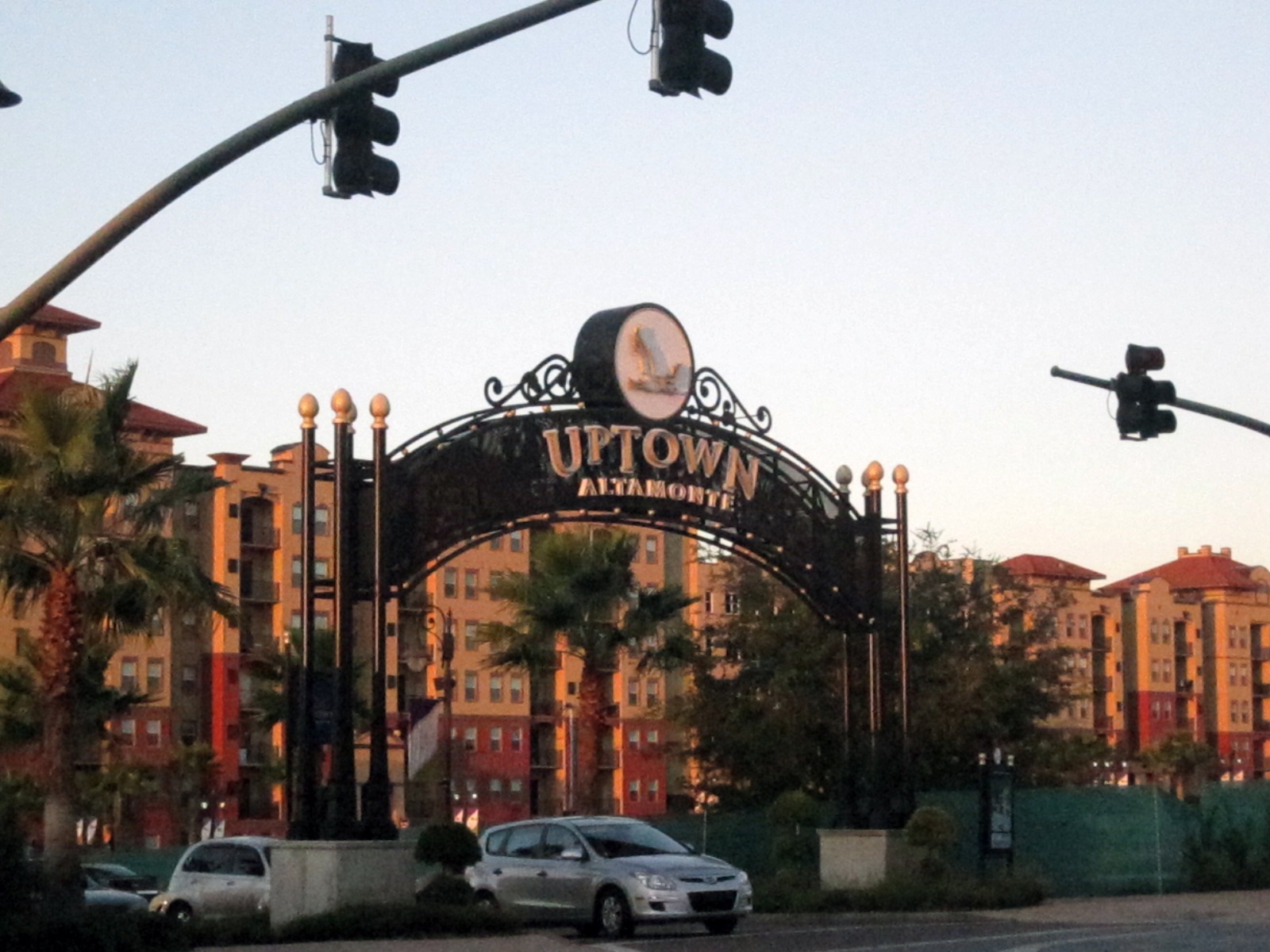
Uptown Altamonte

Cranes Roost Park, Cranes Roost Lake, and the general area on State Road 436 east of Interstate 4 is known as the central area of the city. This is the area that borders Interstate 4 which is the main interstate highway for Central Florida connecting Daytona Beach, Orlando, and Tampa. An outdoor town center was recently opened named 'Uptown Altamonte' which marks the central business district of the city. Cranes Roost at Uptown Altamonte features a water fountain choreographed to classical, swing and contemporary music.

This city center incorporates large-scale apartment buildings and planned high rise condominiums. The construction also includes mixed use shops and retailers. The park area includes a square for weddings, festivals, and city holidays. The spot has become popular with Altamonte Springs residents, and attracts residents from nearby Longwood, Casselberry, and Maitland. Future plans include two high rise residential structures (in excess of 10 stories) and a series of parking structures to facilitate visitors.

The area includes the Altamonte Mall, a 4-anchor indoor shopping mall, which includes an 18-screen AMC Theatre. Many restaurants are located near the mall.

=== Special events ===
From 1995 until 2026 Altamonte Springs hosted the Red, Hot, & Boom annual firework festival each July 3 in celebration of Independence Day. The event, which included musical performances by nationally and internationally known entertainers and a custom fireworks show with over 15,000 shells, had drawn 200,000 people in later years, and was Central Florida's largest Independence Day celebration. In September 2026, the city council removed funding for the fireworks show for 2027 from the city's budget.

== Parks and recreation ==
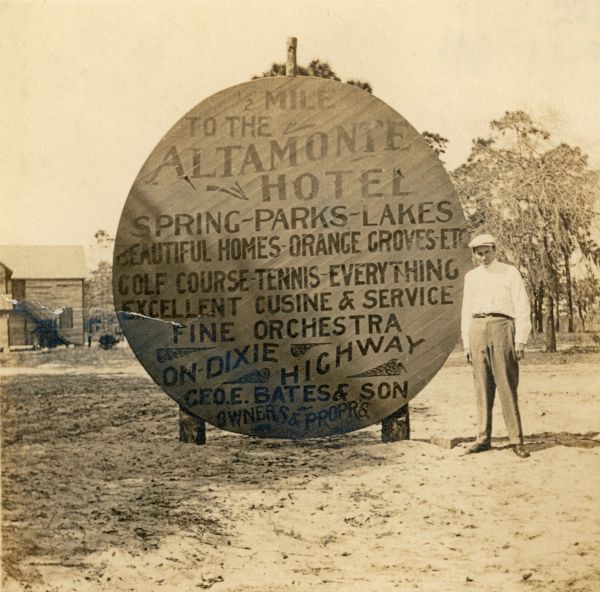
Herbert E. Fuller standing next to an Altamonte Hotel sign

=== Parks and events ===
- A Petrified Forest (Halloween Event)
- Bird Watchers Wanted
- Cranes Roost
- Earth Day Event
- Hermits Trail & Turnbull Ave
- Jr. Rangers Program
- Lake Lotus Nature Park
- Lake Orienta Public Boat Ramp
- Red, Hot, and Boom (Fourth of July Event)
- Sunshine Park

=== Recreation areas ===
- Eastmonte
- Lake Brantley Sports Complex
- Merrill Park
- Westmonte
- Winwood Park

== Infrastructure ==
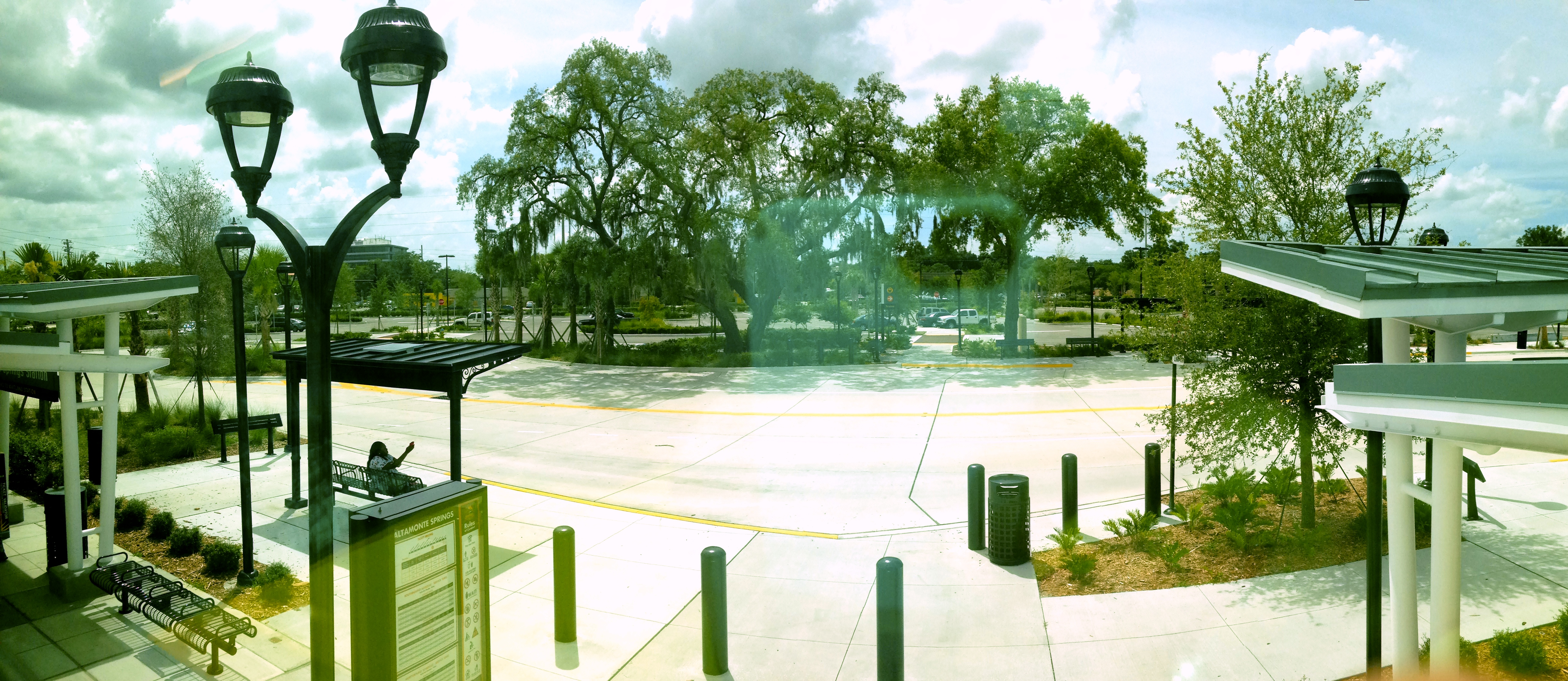
Altamonte Springs SunRail Station

=== Transportation ===
==== Airports ====
Altamonte Springs is served primarily by Orlando International Airport, which is located 30 minutes south. Orlando Sanford International Airport, located 25 minutes north, also serves the area. Orlando Executive Airport, located 20 minutes south, is used for charter flights and general aviation.

==== Bus service ====
Altamonte Springs is served by Lynx, offering local transit service which covers the three-county area (Osceola-Orange-Seminole).

==== Rail ====
Altamonte Springs is served by SunRail, the Central Florida Commuter Rail system. The station opened on May 1, 2014.

=== Healthcare ===
Only one hospital is in Altamonte Springs and that is AdventHealth Altamonte Springs, the city is also the headquarters of AdventHealth.

== Notable people ==
- Lauren Boebert, U.S. Representative for Colorado
- Blake Bortles, former NFL quarterback for the Jacksonville Jaguars
- Nathaniel Jeremiah Bradlee, architect (vacationed in Altamonte Springs)
- Selwyn Carrol, member of the Alaska House of Representatives
- Paul H. Cheney, academic
- Chris DiMarco, professional golfer
- Patrick DiMarco, NFL free agent fullback
- Danielle Fotopoulos, soccer coach and former player
- Nick Franklin, MLB free agent
- John Gast, former MLB pitcher
- Ashleigh Gnat, gymnast and member of the LSU Tigers women's gymnastics team
- Benjamin F. Haines, member of the Massachusetts House of Representatives and later mayor of Altamonte Springs
- Charles Delemere Haines, businessman and member of the U.S. House of Representatives
- Alcee Hastings, judge and member of the U.S. House of Representatives
- Hedy Lamarr, actress (1914–2000), in her final retirement years.
- Kam Lee, an early member of Death as well as a member of Massacre
- Mark Lewis, Arena Football League kicker
- Mitchell Moore, a student whose death at the hands of his mother Marie Lynn sparked controversy about mental health and access to firearms inside gun ranges.
- Daniel Rosario, Puerto Rican footballer
- Rick Rozz, an early member of Death and a founder of Massacre
- Steven Sinofsky, businessman and former president of the Windows division at Microsoft
- Chuck Schuldiner, musician and founding member of Death and Control Denied
- Courtney Schulhoff, convicted murderer
- Anfernee Simons, NBA player for the Portland Trail Blazers
- Jennifer Sullivan, member of the Florida House of Representatives
- Rob Thomas, lead singer of Matchbox Twenty
- Rickie Weeks Jr., retired MLB second baseman
- Ian Williams, former NFL player for the San Francisco 49ers
