= University of Georgia College of Veterinary Medicine =

Veterinary medicine school in Athens, Georgia, US

Coordinates: 33.94077°N 83.37426°W

- Type: Public
- Established: 1946
- Dean: Dr. Lisa Nolan
- Location: Athens, Georgia, USA
- Website: vet.uga.edu

The University of Georgia College of Veterinary Medicine is a college within the University of Georgia (UGA) in Athens, Georgia, United States.

== History ==
A comprehensive history of the College, The Year of the Jubilee, was compiled and written in 2000 by J.T. Mercer and Robert Duncan. Most of the information written here is taken from that history.

The College opened in 1946. The first laboratories were housed in Hardman Hall, which had previously been used as a livestock judging pavilion and later as a Navy warehouse. The school graduated its first class of 44 students in 1950, the year it was accredited.

In 1951, the vet school's first permanent building was opened to house the school and clinics. In 1970, the Board of Regents approved a name change from the School of Veterinary Medicine to the College of Veterinary Medicine, reflecting the expansion of the College's graduate, research and service programs.

Construction on a new wing for The Institute of Comparative Medicine (ICM) began in 1971. The Athens Diagnostic Laboratory opened in two small rooms on the first floor of the College in July 1972, and later that year, the building that now houses the Community Practice Clinic also was built. The current Teaching Hospital building was completed for occupation in 1979. The state-of-the-art Animal Health Research Center was completed in 2006. $7.7 million in planning funds for a new Veterinary Medical Learning Center (which will include a new, expanded teaching hospital facility) were approved by the Georgia General Assembly in April 2010 (Athens Banner-Herald, May 2, 2010).

The College's inaugural Veterinary Conference was held in May 1964, and the College's 51st consecutive Annual Conference and Alumni Reunion was held on March 28–29, 2014.

The College began construction of the Veterinary Medicine Learning Center in March 2013.

The new campus is UGA’s third Athens campus, counting the main campus and the recently added Health Sciences Campus in Athens’ Normaltown neighborhood. The project includes a small and large animal teaching hospital, faculty offices, research labs and an academic learning center that houses classrooms and a conference area. At about 300,000 square feet, the one and two-story Veterinary Medical Learning Center is about 50 percent bigger than UGA’s Miller Learning Center, slightly more than 200,000 square feet.

In its 2019 Best Veterinary Schools rankings published in 2020, U.S. News & World Report ranked the College in the top ten of all veterinary schools.
