= Altamonte Springs City Library =

Library in Florida, US

Coordinates: 28.658784°N 81.365628°W

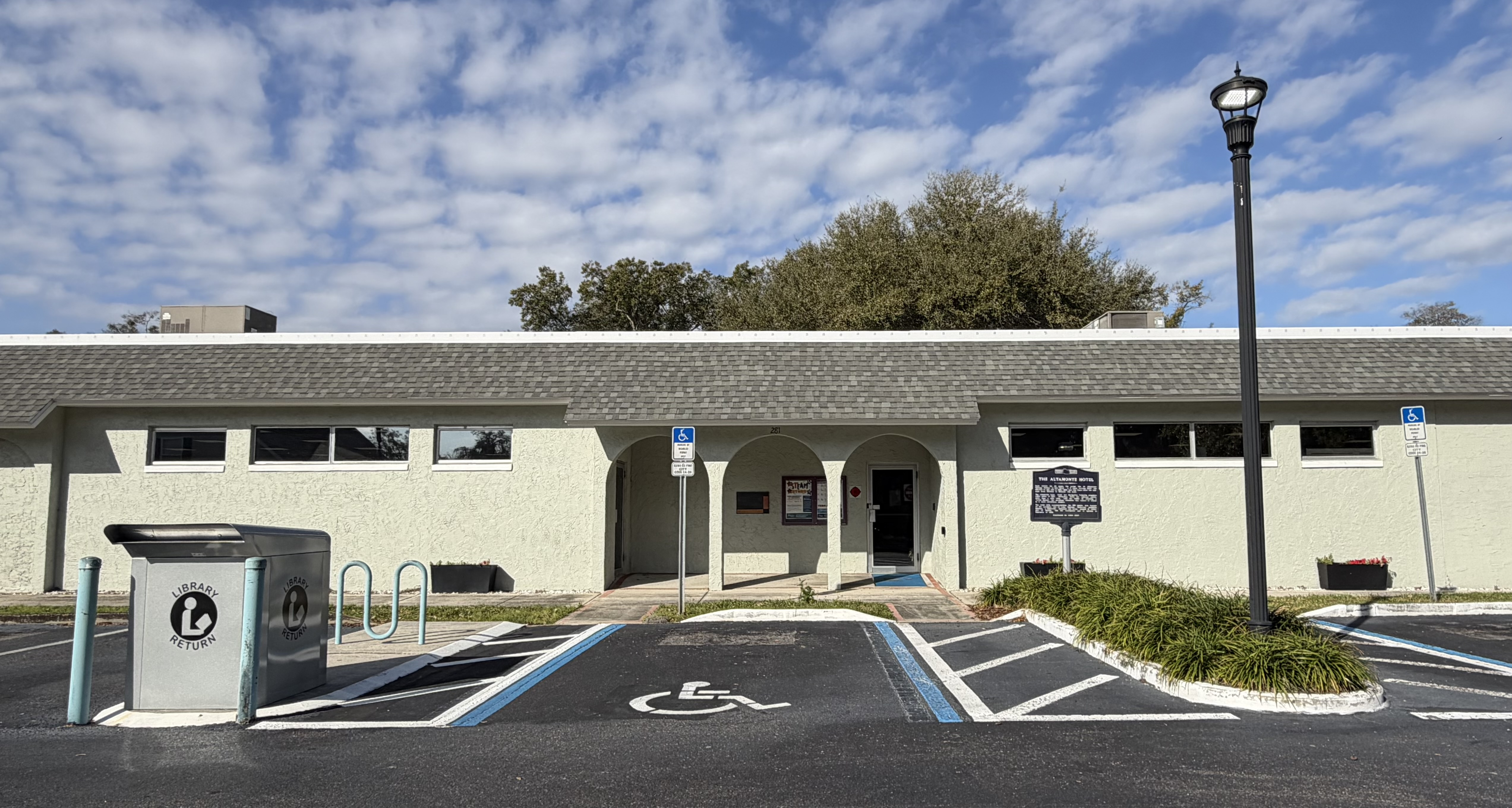
- The library in 2026
- Location: 281 Maitland Avenue; Altamonte Springs, Florida 32701, United States
- Type: Public
- Established: 1960

Collection
- Size: 44,000

Other information
- Website: altamontespringscity.library.site

Altamonte Springs City Library serves the residents of Altamonte Springs, Florida. As of 1999, there are not any residential requirements necessary to join. The collection boasts 44,000 items, including periodicals, books, online databases, and Altamonte Springs history archives. The library has a separate children's library which offers programs such as story time and other creative events for children. Altamonte Springs City Library has a reputation for being a friendly service-orientated community library. Former director Richard Miller states a library “is the only education institution that caters entirely to personal need… You come in with a question-any question you want- and we will try to provide the answer for you.”

== Early history ==
The original library was based on a book collection donated by Anne Cline, a retired schoolteacher and Altamonte Springs community leader. Cline, as President of the Altamonte Springs Civic Club, saw the potential to create a community library in 1959. At the time, the closest public library was in Winter Park. Unfortunately, Cline died before her plans could be completed. However, the members of the Altamonte Springs Civic Club and friends of Cline formed the Altamonte Springs Library Association in June 1959. They elected Dorothy Fuller as president of the Library Association with Betty French as secretary.

Dorothy Fuller found an empty cottage on the grounds of the community center where the Civics Club held their meetings. The cottage, owned by the Bundy family, became known as Grandma Bundy's Cottage. Several members of the community donated their time and funds to clear the land surrounding the cottage, painting the cottage, and landscaping.

Anne's Cline collection was matched by a donation of sixty-five boxes (1,000 books) from Rollins College. The remaining summer, fall, and winter months of 1959 were spent cataloging and preparing the donated books for the shelves. Community volunteers worked under the direction of Betty French, who served at the first volunteer-librarian. On January 31, 1960, an Open House and Tea was held for the public. Four days later, the library officially opened and for the first three years, the library grew through book donations. The Association raised money through fundraising events and through a generous donation on July 10, 1961, the Association bought the Bundy Cottage. The original Cottage was closed in 1977 and was demolished in 1985.

== South Seminole Community Library ==
The second stage of development occurred in 1968 when the Altamonte Springs Library Association, in an effort to reach the greater community, changed its name to the South Seminole Community Library Association. A new 2,880 square building was dedicated on December 13, 1970, at their present address 281 N. Maitland Avenue. The ceremonial ribbon cutting was observed by the former first president of the library association, Dorothy Fuller and the president at the time, Mrs. Cockley. The facility cost $60,000 and although the Association attempted to pay off the mortgage, in 1977 the city offered to assume the management of the library and its operating expenses. This included the remaining $10,000 mortgage, which was signed over to the city by Sadelle Pate, President, and Florence Coursen, Secretary, of the South Seminole Community Library Association.

The South Seminole Community Library continued to be staffed by volunteers with Florence Coursen, the only paid full-time employee. Coursen, who stepped in after Betty French in 1962, still remembered the four-room cottage that housed the original library.

South Seminole Community Library, which in the early 1970s was one of three community libraries in Seminole County, resisted the county's proposal to become part of the county-wide library system. In 1974, George Hearn, library association president, stated to journalists that “we built it with our own hands and our own sweat and blood and we’ll hold on to it.”

== Altamonte Springs City Library ==
The City of Altamonte expanded the library building in September 1985 to house the Greater Seminole County Chamber of Commerce. The now 8,240 square foot facility was shared between the Altamonte Springs City Library and the Chamber of Commerce until the Chamber relocated in September 1990. The children's section of the library now occupies this space.

In 1982, the new city Library was featured in an article from the Seminole Little Sentinel entitled “Once orphan, library thrives in Altamonte.” In the article, Katherine Petty, the volunteer librarian at the time, states that the city of Altamonte has “just done wonders with [the library] since they took over.” In 1986, the library hired its first fully accredited librarian, Karen Potter, and expanded service hours. It housed 25,000 books and offered a greater breadth of library programming, which included adult literacy and children's programs with puppets.

On Sunday February 4, 1990, the library held its 30th anniversary which was commemorated by a ribbon cutting celebration. Speakers at the anniversary included Betty French and city officials at the time. The celebration also honored its volunteers for their dedication.

Internet was made available in 1996 and automation of the catalog which was begun in 1991 was completed in 2003 using Precision One by Brodart. As of 2006, and Online Public Access Catalog (OPAC) was made available to the public for remote access of the library's holdings. Patrons can view their personal accounts and reserve books from home as well.

== Library Slated for Closure; Saved By Citizens ==
The city announced closure of the library on July 8, 2024, citing budget constraints and rising costs. The library was set to close permanently September 30, 2024.

However, the city held a special meeting to discuss the library shutting down, and residents argued to commissioners that the library should not shut down and is vital to the city.
