= Pad site =

A pad site or outparcel is a freestanding parcel of commercial real estate located in the front of a larger shopping center or strip mall. Desirable because of their visibility to consumers, accessibility, and the ease of facilitating drive-thru service, pad sites are typically sought after by banks, casual dining, and fast food restaurants. Pad sites usually range between 2,000 and 75,000 square feet (190 and 6,970 m^{2}). They can be ground leased by developers or purchased outright. The former offers a lower up-front cost, but the user is unable to use the land as collateral to finance building expenses because pad sites do not have their own legal address. The latter requires a larger investment, but provides the user an appreciable asset.
