= Walter Sims (Florida politician) =

American politician (1923–2011)

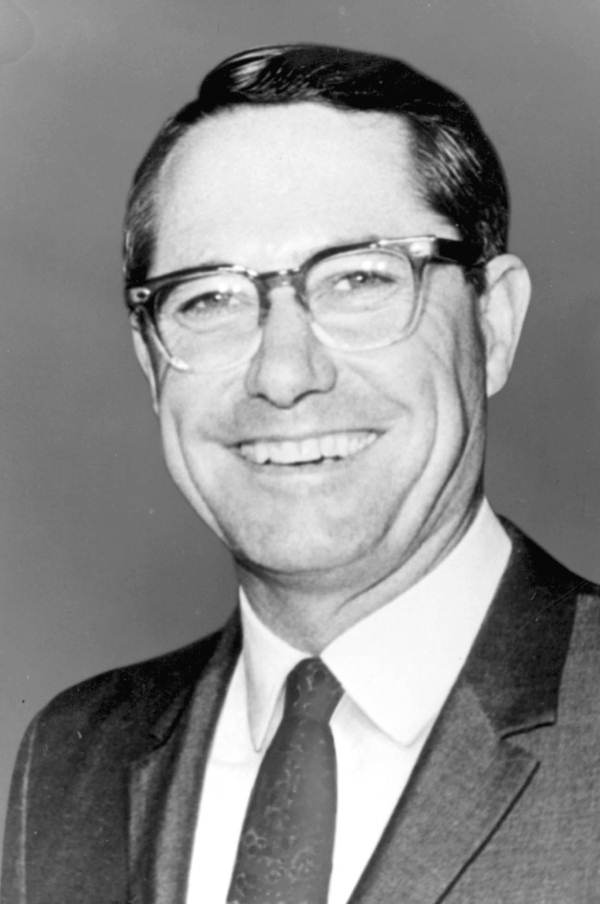
- Sims in 1970

Member of the Florida House of Representatives from the 41st district
- In office 1970–1972
- Preceded by: David Lindsey
- Succeeded by: Fred B. Hagan

Member of the Florida Senate from the 15th district
- In office 1972–1976

Personal details
- Born: September 5, 1923 Athens, Alabama, U.S.
- Died: May 2011 (aged 87)
- Party: Republican

Walter Sims (September 5, 1923 – May 2011) was an American politician. He served as a Republican member for the 41st district of the Florida House of Representatives. He also served as a member for the 15th district of the Florida Senate.

== Life and career ==
Sims was born in Athens, Alabama. He was a realtor.

In 1970, Sims was elected to represent the 41st district of the Florida House of Representatives, succeeding David Lindsey. He served until 1972, when he was succeeded by Fred B. Hagan. In the same year, he was elected to represent the 15th district of the Florida Senate, serving until 1976.

Sims died in May 2011, at the age of 87.
