= Florida's 38th House of Representatives district =

Florida district

Florida's 38th State House of Representatives district
Representative
David Smith; R–Winter Springs

Florida's 38th House of Representatives district elects one member of the Florida House of Representatives. It covers parts of Seminole County.

== Members ==
- David Smith (since 2022)
