= Bryan L. Reuss =

American orthopaedic surgeon (born 1974)

Bryan L. Reuss (born 1974 in Omaha, Nebraska) is an American orthopaedic surgeon. He received a Bachelor of Arts Degree in Biology with distinction from the University of Kansas in 1996 and graduated with honors with an M.D. from the University of Nebraska College of Medicine in 2000. From 2000 to 2005, Dr. Reuss was an Orthopaedic Surgery Resident Physician in the Orlando Regional Healthcare System. In 2004-2005 he was awarded the "Resident of the Year" for Orlando Regional Healthcare chosen from all the hospital system's Resident Doctors. He completed an Orthopaedic Fellowship at the University of Cincinnati/Wellington Orthopaedics and Sports Medicine Fellowship in 2006. In 2010, Dr. Reuss was awarded the Sports Medicine Person of the Year from the Athletic Trainers Association of Florida.

== Career ==
Reuss is Board Certified in orthopaedic surgery and is also Board Certified in sports medicine. He has been an orthopaedic surgeon at Orlando Orthopaedic Center since 2006. He specializes in orthopaedic sports medicine, with a focus on minimally-invasive surgeries of the shoulder, hip, and knee. Reuss has been a guest speaker and keynote presenter at numerous orthopaedic conferences including presentations at the Florida Orthopaedic Society Annual Meeting, the Annual Orlando Orthopaedic Center Sports Medicine Symposium, the Annual Orthopaedic Seminar for National Association of Orthopaedic Nurses, the Florida Workman's Compensation Conference, the Annual Sports Medicine Congress, the FSARN Annual Meeting, the Florida Hospital Sports Medicine Symposium, the Orlando Health Orthopaedic Summit, the University of Central Florida, and the Athletic Trainers Association of Florida Annual Symposium. Reuss has performed live and webcast surgeries including a live knee meniscus repair surgery at the National Workers' Compensation Judiciary College in 2010, a live ACL Reconstruction Surgery at the Orlando Orthopaedics Sports Medicine Symposium for Athletic Trainers and Physical Therapists, and in 2014 performed a live triceps repair and pre-recorded a live shoulder labrum repair for the 69th Annual Workers' Compensation Educational Conference and the 26th Annual Safety and Health Conference.

== Board, executive committee memberships and awards ==
Reuss has served as Chairman of the Department of Orthopaedics for Orlando Health Medical Center and as a Member of the Perioperative Governing Board, the Orthopaedic Medical Outcomes Committee, and on the Medical Executive Committee (Nominations Committee) for Orlando Health Medical Center. He is an Advisory Board member for the Florida State Association of Rehabilitation Nurses and is a reviewer for the American Journal of Sports Medicine. Reuss is a board member of the MileSplit Medical Advisory Board with three other medical professionals: Gideon J. Lewis, Lisa Barkley, and Laura Podschun. He is a long-time member of the Arthroscopy Association of North America, the National Athletic Trainers Association, and the Athletic Trainers Association of Florida.

Reuss has served on numerous board and committees including:

- Member of Attorney General Bill McCollum's Healthcare Committee
- Physician's Council for Responsible Reform- Physician Consultant to Republican members of the United States Congress
- Central Florida Doctor Publication Advisory Board
- Volunteer committee member for Special Olympics Florida
- Sponsor and volunteer for Metropolitan Orlando Urban League-Youth Empowerment Program

Reuss has won several awards, including the 2010 Sports Medicine Person of the Year from the Athletic Trainers Association of Florida and the Florida Orthopaedic Society Injured Worker's Inspiration Award. In 2014, he won the Exemplary Physician Colleague Award from the Executive Nursing Leaders at Orlando Health. As a resident, he won the 2004-2005 "Resident of the Year" for Orlando Regional Healthcare chosen from all the hospital system's Resident Doctors and then received the "Attending of the Year" in 2014 for his efforts as a Sports Medicine faculty of the Orlando Health Orthopaedic Residency Program. He also won first place in the 2007 Resident Writer's Competition for the American Journal of Orthopedics and first place in the 2005 Florida Orthopaedic Society Resident Research Competition. In 2015, he was named as one of Orlando's "Top Doctors" and "Best Doctors.". In 2016, Reuss was named one of the Best Doctors for Orthopaedic Surgery in Orlando Family magazine and also chosen as a Reader's Choice Best Doctor, Orthopaedic Surgery by the readers of the magazine.

== Faculty positions and professorships ==
- University of Central Florida College of Medicine Clinical Faculty from 2009 to present
- Arthrex Teaching Faculty- National Educator for Orthopaedic Surgeons from 2010 to present
- Orlando Health Orthopaedic Residency Program Sports Medicine Clinical Faculty from 2006 to 2014
- Nova Southeastern University Physician Assistant Program, Clinical Faculty from 2009 to 2011

== Sports physician positions ==
Reuss has been a physician for the following sports teams and entertainment venues:

Current:

- Team Physician for the Orlando Predators
- Physician for PGA's Arnold Palmer Invitational
- Associate Physician for Cirque Du Soleil, La Nouba, Orlando, FL
- Head Team Physician for Boone High School, Orlando, FL
- Associate Physician for Seminole State College
- Associate Physician for Bethune-Cookman University
- Associate Team Physician for Lake Brantley High School, Lyman High School, University High School, Apopka High School, Trinity Prep High School, Hagerty High School, Oviedo High School, Winter Springs High School, Timber Creek High School, East River High School, Colonial High School, Lake Mary Prep High School, and Evans High School

Past:

- Cincinnati Bengals Assistant Team Physician 2005-2006
- University of Cincinnati Athletics Assistant Team Physician 2005-2006
- NFL Combine Physician 2006
- ATP Masters Series (Professional Tennis Tour) Physician 2005 – 2006
- USA Boxing Physician 2008
- United Football League 2009-2010
- East-West Shrine Game 2010-2011
- A-10 Conference Basketball Tournament 2010
- USA Rugby 2004
- Campbell County High School Team Physician 2005-2006

== Publications ==
- Schwartzberg, R; Reuss, BL; Burkhart, BG; Butterfield, M; Wu, JY; McLean, KW (2016). "High Prevalence of Superior Labral Tears Diagnosed by MRI in Middle-Aged Patients With Asymptomatic Shoulders". Orthop J Sports Med. 4 (1). doi:10.1177/2325967115623212. PMC 4710128. PMID 26779556.
- November, R (1988). "Documentation: professional goals and legal outcomes". Todays OR Nurse. 10 (11): 8–11. PMID 2462291.
- Connolly, KP; Schwartzberg, RS; Reuss, B; Crumbie, D; Homan, BM (2013). "Sensitivity and specificity of noncontrast magnetic resonance imaging reports in the diagnosis of type-II superior labral anterior-posterior lesions in the community setting". J Bone Joint Surg Am. 95 (4): 308–13. doi:10.2106/JBJS.K.01115. PMID 23426764.
- Houtz, CG; Schwartzberg, RS; Barry, JA; Reuss, BL; Papa, L (2011). "Shoulder MRI accuracy in the community setting". J Shoulder Elbow Surg. 20 (4): 537–42. doi:10.1016/j.jse.2011.01.003. PMID 21440460.
- Reuss, BL; Cole, JD (2007). "Effect of delayed treatment on open tibial shaft fractures". Am. J. Orthop. 36 (4): 215–20. PMID 17515190.
- Reuss, BL; Schwartzberg, R; Zlatkin, M; Cooperman, A; Dixon, J (2006). "Accuracy of MRI in the Diagnosis of Type 2 SLAP Lesions". Journal of Shoulder and Elbow Surgery. 15 (5): 580–85. doi:10.1016/j.jse.2005.10.011. PMID 16979053.
- Herrera-Soto, JA; Price, CT; Reuss, BL; Riley, P; Kasser, JR; Beaty, JH (2006). "Proximal femoral epiphysiolysis during reduction of hip dislocation in adolescents". J Pediatr Orthop. 26 (3): 371–4. doi:10.1097/01.bpo.0000214925.41056.b9. PMID 16670551. S2CID 24115330.
- Reuss, BL; Harding, WG; Nowicki, KD (2004). "Managing anterior shoulder instability with bracing: an expanded update". Orthopedics. 27 (6): 614–8. doi:10.3928/0147-7447-20040601-19. PMID 15237902.
- Reuss, BL (2004). "Managing Ankle Injuries: Follow the Rules?". Journal of Musculoskeletal Medicine. 21 (3): 155–164.
- "Calcaneofibular Ligament Injuries". Reuss, BL, Wadman, M, and Schwartzberg, R. Sports Medicine Chapter, eMedicine.com.
- "Shoulder Pain: The Difference Between a Nuisance and a Surgical Indication". Reuss, BL. Orlando Medical News, 2008.
- "Gender-bending Breakthrough." Reuss BL. Orlando Medical News, 2008.
- "Minimally Invasive Hip Surgery" Reuss BL. Orlando Medical News, 2012
- Schwartzberg; Reuss; Burkhart; Hanekom; Warrell; Abdul (October 2013). "Efficacy of Continuous Subacromial Bupivacaine Infusion for Pain Control After Arthroscopic Rotator Cuff Repair". Journal of Shoulder and Elbow Surgery. 22 (10): 1320–1324. doi:10.1016/j.jse.2013.03.016. PMID 23668921.
- "Efficacy of Subacromial Bupivicaine Pain Catheter for Arthroscopic Rotator Cuff Repair." Journal of Shoulder and Elbow Surgery, 2013
- Schwartzberg, RS; Reuss, BL; Rust, R (2013). "Efficacy of continuous subacromial bupivacaine infusion for pain control after arthroscopic rotator cuff repair". J Shoulder Elbow Surg. 22 (10): 1320–4. doi:10.1016/j.jse.2013.03.016. PMID 23668921.

== Research ==
- "Continuous Infusion Ropivacaine Intrascalene Blocks Versus Placebo after Arthroscopic Rotator Cuff Repair" 013-2014 Co-Senior Author with Randy Schwartzberg, M.D., Firas Abdul, M.D., and Bradd Burkhart, M.D.
- "Pre-operative Measurements of ACL Insertion Sites" 2012-2013 Co-Senior Author with Randy Schwartzberg, M.D. and Kevin Snyder, M.D.
- "Safety of Transphyseal ACL Reconstruction in Skeletally-Immature Patients." Faculty investigator Angelo Colosimo, M.D. 2005-2006 Primary Investigator
- "Functional and Biomechanical Evaluation of a New Shoulder Brace for Anterior Shoulder Instability." Faculty investigators Warren Harding III, M.D. and Robert Heidt, Jr., M.D. 2005-2006 Primary Investigator
- "Correlation between MRI and MR-Arthrogram with Arthroscopic Findings in Patients with Type 2 SLAP Lesions." Faculty investigator Randy Schwartzberg, M.D. 2001-2005 Primary Investigator.
- "The Timing of Formal Treatment and Its Effect on Open Tibial Shaft Fracture Infection and Nonunion Rate." Faculty Investigator JD Cole, M.D. 2001-2005 Primary Investigator.
- "Shoulder Bracing for Anterior Shoulder Instability: An Expanded Update." Faculty Investigator Kevin Nowicki, M.D. 2003-2006 Primary Investigator.
- "Efficacy of Continuous Infusion Ropivacaine Interscalene Blocks Versus Placebo for Pain Control After Arthroscopic Rotator Cuff Repair"
- "Cylindrical Bone Plug Creation Time and Efficacy Using Cylindrical Bone Grinder versus Rongeur in ACL Reconstruction." Faculty investigator Russ Alberts, M.D. 1998-1999 Primary Investigator.
