= Phillis Wheatley School =

School in Florida, U.S.

Coordinates: 28.6568°N 81.5134°W

- Apopka, Florida; United States

Information
- Former name: Apopka Colored School
- Type: Segregated public school
- School district: Orange County Public Schools
- Website: wheatleyes.ocps.net

Phillis Wheatley High School, previously Apopka Colored School, was a school for Black children in Apopka, Florida, prior to desegregation of the public schools. It is now Phillis Wheatley Elementary School.

== History ==
A school for Black students in Apopka began operating around 1886. This school later merged with another, initially known simply as "the colored school," which began operating sometime between 1910 and 1921 in a black neighborhood known as Mead's Bottom. In its early days, only younger Black children had any opportunity to attend school, as older children were expected to work. Over time, the school added grades until it served kindergarten through 12th grade. In 1927 the school moved from its original two-story building on Central Avenue to a four-room building on 18th street. Due to overcrowding, classes and offices were housed in the hallway. The school was initially supported by private contributions. Students cooked their own meals; men from the community provided maintenance. The school was renamed in honor of Phillis Wheatley, who was kidnapped in Africa as a child and enslaved in Boston; she taught herself to read and in 1773 published Poems on Various Subjects, Religious and Moral, "the first book written by an enslaved Black woman in America."

In 1957, construction on a new building began. In 1954, in Brown vs. Board, the U.S. Supreme Court ruled that integration of public schools must occur with "all deliberate speed." In 1962, a ruling in a case brought by parents, Ellis v. Orange County Board of Public Instruction, ruled that Black schools had not been given adequate funding, facilities, instructional materials, etc.—in other words, separate was not equal—and that the district must fully desegregate. In 1969, Orange County Public Schools eventually responded by closing Wheatley and sent the high school students to Apopka High School. Wheatley was converted to an elementary school. The changes were opposed by a large percentage of residents of both races: 95% of Black residents wanted Wheatley to stay open, while most white residents did not want integration at all. As a result, over 3,000 students boycotted the schools.

In 2010, the school district was recognized by the courts as having ended segregation but was additionally required to replace a group of old schools that predominantly served Black children. This construction was completed in 2018.

The school's sports teams were known as the Panthers. In 1958 they placed third in the national championships.

The school currently has an enrollment of 403 students in grades PK–5.

== Notable alumni ==
- Eddie C. Brown, fund manager
- Alzo Reddick, professor, politician, first Black faculty member of Rollins College
