= Horizon High School (Winter Garden, Florida) =

Coordinates: 28.4173°N 81.6263°W

Location
- 10393 Seidel Road; Winter Garden, Florida 34787; United States

Information
- School type: Public high school
- Motto: "Elevate the Pursuit"
- Established: 2021
- School district: Orange County Public Schools
- Principal: Brian Sanchez Corona
- Teaching staff: 99.00 (on an FTE basis)
- Grades: 9–12
- Enrollment: 2,300 (2023-2024)
- Student to teacher ratio: 23.23
- Campus type: Rural
- Colors: Purple, orange and white
- Nickname: Hawks
- Rival: Windermere High School
- Website: horizonhs.ocps.net

Horizon High School is a public high school located in the Winter Garden area of southwest Orange County, Florida, United States. Horizon High School was built in 2021 as a relief school to reduce overcrowding in nearby high schools West Orange High School and Windermere High School. It is part of the Orange County Public Schools and serves grades 9–12.

== Academics ==
Advanced Placement courses available at Horizon High School are:

- AP 2-D Art and Design
- AP 3-D Art and Design
- AP Art History
- AP Biology
- AP Calculus AB
- AP Calculus BC
- AP Chemistry
- AP Computer Science A
- AP Computer Science Principles
- AP Drawing
- AP English Language and Composition
- AP English Literature and Composition
- AP Macroeconomics
- AP Microeconomics
- AP Music Theory
- AP Precalculus
- AP Physics 1: Algebra-Based
- AP Physics 2: Algebra-Based
- AP Physics C: Mechanics
- AP Physics C: Electricity and Magnetism
- AP Research
- AP Seminar
- AP Statistics
- AP Comparative Government and Politics
- AP United States Government and Politics
- AP United States History

== Athletics ==
Sports at HHS include:

- Baseball (JV, Varsity)
- Beach Volleyball (Girls Varsity)
- Bowling (Boys Varsity; Girls Varsity)
- Basketball (Boys Freshmen, Sophomore, JV, Varsity; Girls JV, Varsity)
- Competitive Cheer (Varsity)
- Cross Country (Boys Varsity; Girls Varsity)
- Flag Football (Girls JV, Varsity)
- Football (JV, Varsity)
- Golf (Boys Varsity; Girls Varsity)
- Lacrosse (Boys Varsity; Girls JV, Varsity)
- Soccer (Boys JV, Varsity; Girls JV, Varsity)
- Softball (JV, Varsity)
- Swimming (Boys Varsity; Girls Varsity)
- Tennis (Boys Varsity; Girls Varsity)
- Track & Field (Boys Varsity; Girls Varsity)
- Volleyball (Boys JV, Varsity; Girls Freshman, JV, Varsity)
- Water Polo (Boys Varsity)
- Weightlifting (Boys Varsity; Girls Varsity)
- Wrestling (Boys Varsity; Girls Varsity)
