= Apopka High School =

Public high school in Apopka, Florida, United States

Location
- 555 West Martin Street; Apopka, Florida; 28.69211°N 81.522556°W

Information
- Former name: Apopka Memorial High School
- Type: Public
- Motto: Hoka Hey
- Established: 1885
- School district: Orange County Public Schools
- Principal: Lyle Heinz
- Staff: 136.00 (FTE)
- Grades: 9-12
- Enrollment: 3,446 (2024–2025)
- Student to teacher ratio: 25.34
- Colors: Blue and White
- Mascot: Dewey Darter & Daisy Darter
- Nickname: Blue Darters
- Website: apopkahs.ocps.net

Apopka High School is a public high school in Apopka, Florida, part of Orange County Public Schools serving grades 9 through 12. The school has been honored a Blue Ribbon School of Excellence.

== History ==
According to a historical marker placed by the Apopka Historical Society, Apopka's first public schoolhouse was built in 1885. It was a small three-room building that stood beside the original Apopka Baptist Church, west of the site known as the Old Church Cemetery. In 1891, the schoolhouse burned down, forcing classes to be relocated to another building for the remainder of the year.

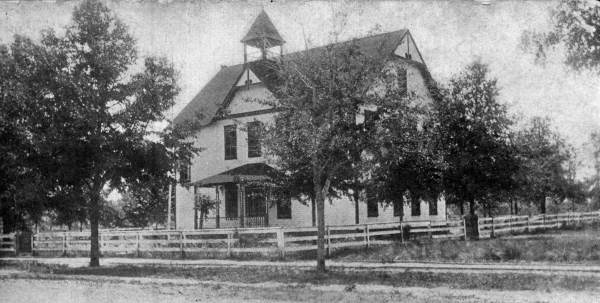
Apopka Union School, circa 1901

In 1896, voters approved the construction of a new schoolhouse on Fourth Street, later Main Street. The new school opened for the 1897 school year. In 1901, the State of Florida accredited the school, which was named Apopka Union School, which was destroyed by a tornado in 1918, and was rebuilt by May 1925. To honor WWII veterans, the school's name was changed to Apopka Memorial High School in 1953, serving grades 7–12. In 1976, according to the school's alumni association, Orange County Public Schools built a new school at the current location on Martin Street, modifying the name to Apopka High School, and in 2009, the school was completely rebuilt. Apopka High's accreditation was last renewed in 2010 by AdvancED: Southern Association of Colleges and Schools.

=== Desegregation ===
According to Orange County Schools History,

The 1954 Brown v. Board of Education of Topeka ruling made segregation unconstitutional; however, it was several years before desegregation began in Orange County.

In 1969, the first Black faculty and some students from all-Black Phillis Wheatley High School (previously known as Apopka Colored School) were admitted to the school. Nine of the school's 63 faculty members that year were Black, as were 336 of the school's 1,269 students.

A large percentage of residents of both races opposed the plan. 95% of Black residents wanted Wheatley to stay open, but most white residents did not want integration at all. As a result, over 3,000 students boycotted the schools. Despite these issues, the consolidation was described as one of the smoothest in Orange County.

== Athletics ==
Apopka competes in the Florida High School Athletic Association and has about 26 total sports teams.

The football team won the class 6A State Championship in 2001. The Apopka Blue Darters, led by Head Coach Rick Darlington, have collected two 8A state titles ('12 & '14) along with a 2013 state runner-up. The Apopka High School football team competes in District 4, Region 1 of FHSAA Class 8A. They hold an overall record of 106-29 since 2005. Darlington left Apopka after the 2018 season, and currently coaches football at DeLand High School.

Apopka High School boys varsity bowling team had three consecutive undefeated seasons in 2013, 2014, and 2015. The boys' varsity team won the 2013 and 2014 Men's bowling state championships undefeated both years with the same five starters on the team for both years.

The boys basketball team won the 1962 Class A state championship.

== Curriculum ==
Apopka High School has a dedicated classroom for students to work on their Florida Virtual School assignments, a new graduation requirement instituted first for the class of 2015. Adult education courses have been provided since at least 1974.

== Demographics ==
Apopka High School fosters a multi-ethnic student population that currently consists of some 3,446 students as of the 2024-2025 school year.

Enrollment as of 2024-2025
Number of students	Student race/ethnicity
~845	White
~1,088	Black
~1,315	Hispanic
~81	Asian
~6	American Indian/Alaska Native
~13	Native Hawaiian/Pacific Islander
~98	Two or More Races
~3,446 Total

== Notable alumni ==
- John Anderson (musician), American country musician
- Steve Baylark, professional football player, Sacramento Mountain Lions
- Rogers Beckett, former professional football player, San Diego Chargers, Cincinnati Bengals
- Rod Brewer, former MLB player (St. Louis Cardinals)
- Jalen Carter, NFL defensive tackle for the Philadelphia Eagles
- Joe Chealey, basketball player in the Israeli Basketball Premier League
- Chandler Cox, professional football player for the Miami Dolphins
- Nate Douglas, politician and educator
- Kenny Edenfield, football player and coach
- Jeremy Gallon, football player
- Zack Greinke, professional baseball player, Kansas City Royals, Anaheim Angels, Milwaukee Brewers, Los Angeles Dodgers, Arizona Diamondbacks and Houston Astros.
- Trey Hendrickson, NFL defensive end for the Baltimore Ravens
- Martez Ivey, football player
- Aaron Jones, professional football player, Pittsburgh Steelers, New England Patriots, Miami Dolphins.
- James McKnight, former professional football player, Seattle Seahawks, Dallas Cowboys, Miami Dolphins, New York Giants.
- Brandon Meriweather, former professional football player, New England Patriots, Washington Redskins, New York Giants.
- Glenn "Fireball" Roberts, pioneer NASCAR driver
- Warren Sapp, former professional football player, Oakland Raiders, Tampa Bay Buccaneers, Pro Football Hall of Fame
- Donald Scott, professional athletics Team USA jumper, Eastern Michigan University coach
- Sammie Smith, former professional football player, Miami Dolphins, Denver Broncos
- Michael Taylor, former professional baseball player, Philadelphia Phillies, Oakland Athletics, and Chicago White Sox.
- Kyle Wilber, NFL linebacker for the Oakland Raiders
- J. T. Wise, baseball player

== Notable faculty ==
- Bryan L. Reuss, orthopaedic surgeon
