= Chris Board =

American football player (born 1995)

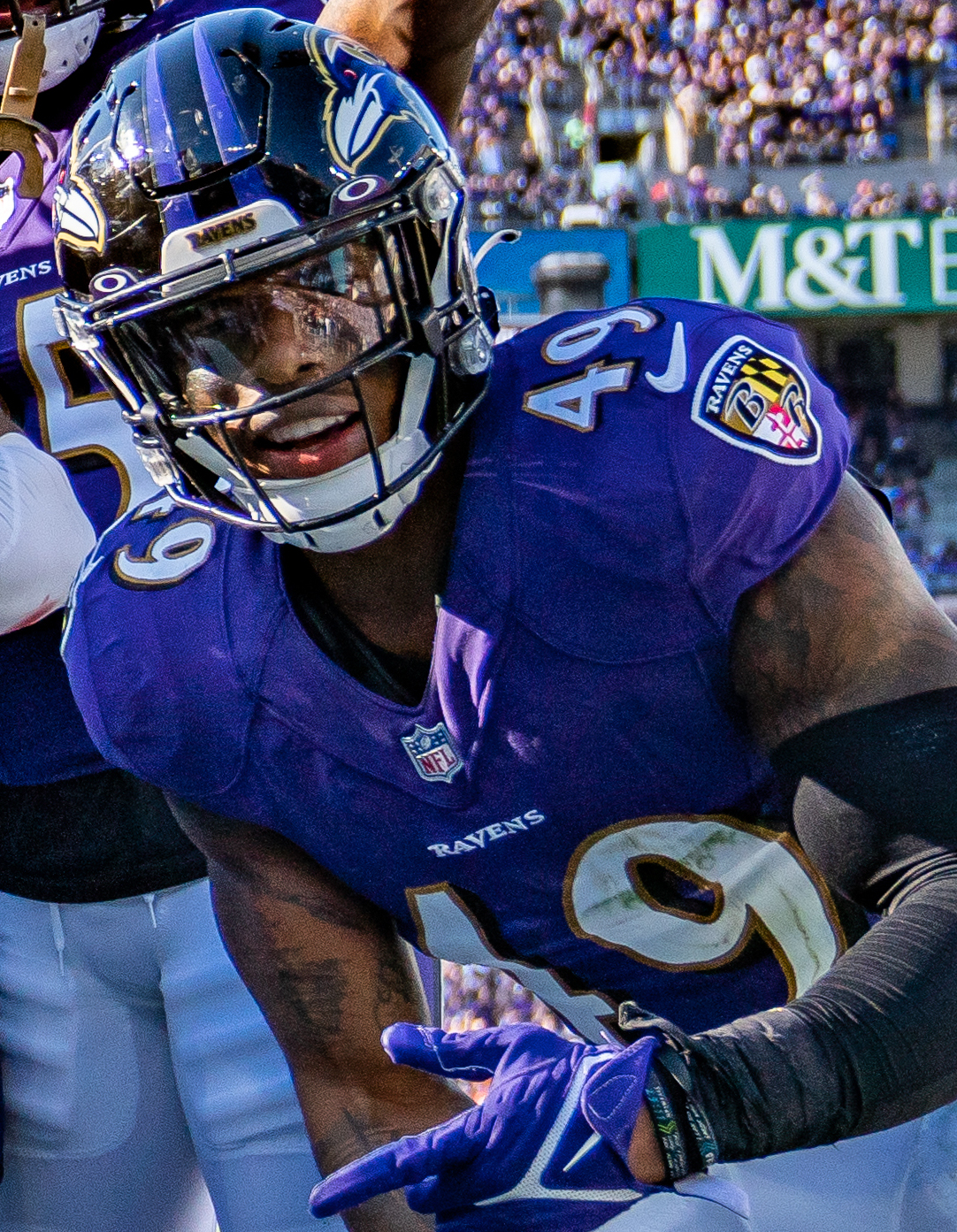
- Board with the Baltimore Ravens in 2021

Profile
- Position: Linebacker

Personal information
- Born: July 23, 1995 (age 31); Memphis, Tennessee, U.S.
- Listed height: 6 ft 2 in (1.88 m)
- Listed weight: 229 lb (104 kg)

Career information
- High school: Timber Creek (Orlando, Florida)
- College: North Dakota State (2013–2017)
- NFL draft: 2018: undrafted

Career history
- Baltimore Ravens (2018–2021); Detroit Lions (2022); New England Patriots (2023); Baltimore Ravens (2024); New York Giants (2025)

Awards and highlights
- 3× FCS national champion (2014, 2015, 2017)

Career NFL statistics as of 2025
- Total tackles: 158
- Sacks: 3.5
- Forced fumbles: 3
- Fumble recoveries: 1
- Pass deflections: 3
- Stats at Pro Football Reference

Christopher Torvan Board (born July 23, 1995) is an American professional football linebacker. He played college football for the North Dakota State Bison, and won four FCS Division 1 Championships with NDSU. He has previously played in the NFL for the Detroit Lions, Baltimore Ravens, and New England Patriots.

== Professional career ==
=== Baltimore Ravens ===
Board signed with the Baltimore Ravens as an undrafted free agent on June 1, 2018. He made the Ravens 53-man roster, playing in all 16 games.

In Week 16 against the New York Giants in 2020, Board recorded his first two career sacks on Daniel Jones during the 27–13 win.

Board signed a one-year contract extension with the Ravens on March 16, 2021.

=== Detroit Lions ===
On March 23, 2022, Board signed a one-year contract with the Detroit Lions.

=== New England Patriots ===
On March 22, 2023, Board signed with the New England Patriots. He played in all 17 games exclusively on special teams. He was released on March 14, 2024.

=== Baltimore Ravens (second stint) ===
On March 19, 2024, Board signed a contract to return to the Ravens.

=== New York Giants ===
On March 12, 2025, the New York Giants signed Board to a two-year, $6 million contract. Board was placed on injured reserve on September 16, having suffered a chest injury in New York's Week 2 game against the Dallas Cowboys.

On March 11, 2026, Board was released by the Giants.
