= University High School (Orlando, Florida) =

Coordinates: 28.576229°N 81.214236°W

Location
- 11501 Eastwood Drive; Orlando, Orange County, Florida 32817; United States

Information
- Type: Public secondary (with some magnet programs)
- Motto: Contio Laureata (Latin: An Assembly of Honored Scholars)
- Established: 1990; 36 years ago
- School district: Orange County Public Schools
- Superintendent: Maria F. Vazquez
- Principal: Christy Gorberg
- Teaching staff: 108.00 (FTE)
- Grades: 9–12
- Enrollment: 2,561 (2023-2024)
- Student to teacher ratio: 23.71
- Colors: Navy and Gold
- Mascot: Cougar
- Newspaper: The Torch
- Yearbook: Unity
- Feeder schools: Legacy Middle, Union Park Middle, Discovery Middle, Corner Lake Middle, Odyssey Middle, Arbor Ridge K–8, Clemente Middle
- Website: universityhs.ocps.net

University High School is a public high school in Orlando, Florida, which opened in 1990. The school is a part of Orange County Public Schools and is located about a mile from the University of Central Florida. University High School serves the East Orlando neighborhoods of Union Park, Alafaya, university, Cypress Springs, and other unincorporated parts of East Orange County.

University High School offers the International Baccalaureate (IB) magnet program, and a Performing Fine Arts magnet program which began in the 2019–20 school year. University High School also has a well known Athletic Training program, Veterinary Assisting program, Culinary Program, Dual Enrollment and Advanced Placement (AP) classes. The school has been named a Blue Ribbon School of Excellence.

The school's mascot is a Florida cougar named Casey the Cougar. The school colors are navy blue and vegas gold. University's main rival is Colonial High School. University and Colonial face off in an annual football game known as Crush Colonial or the Boot Game; the winner takes home the Boot trophy and hosts next year's rival game at their school.

University High School's main campus is designed in a square architectural layout with a courtyard in the middle, with classrooms are located in buildings surrounding the main plaza. Along with this, the main campus includes the 25th building (a separate two-story building, built in 2011) and two rows of portables located at both west and east ends of the school. The East or Innovation Campus (formerly the Freshman Campus) is located across the street from the Main Campus and is predominantly unused due to plans to tear the campus down. Nonetheless, many of the East Campus's remaining portables and cafeteria are still of use to the school and students. University High School's campus's design differs greatly from other OCPS high schools.

== History ==
University High School was built as a relief school for Colonial High School in 1990. Later, Timber Creek High School was built as a relief school for University High School in 2002. More recently, East River High School was built as a relief school for both Timber Creek and University.

University previously had a Global Technologies (GT) magnet program that was discontinued in the 2017–2018 school year and is now known as the GT academy.

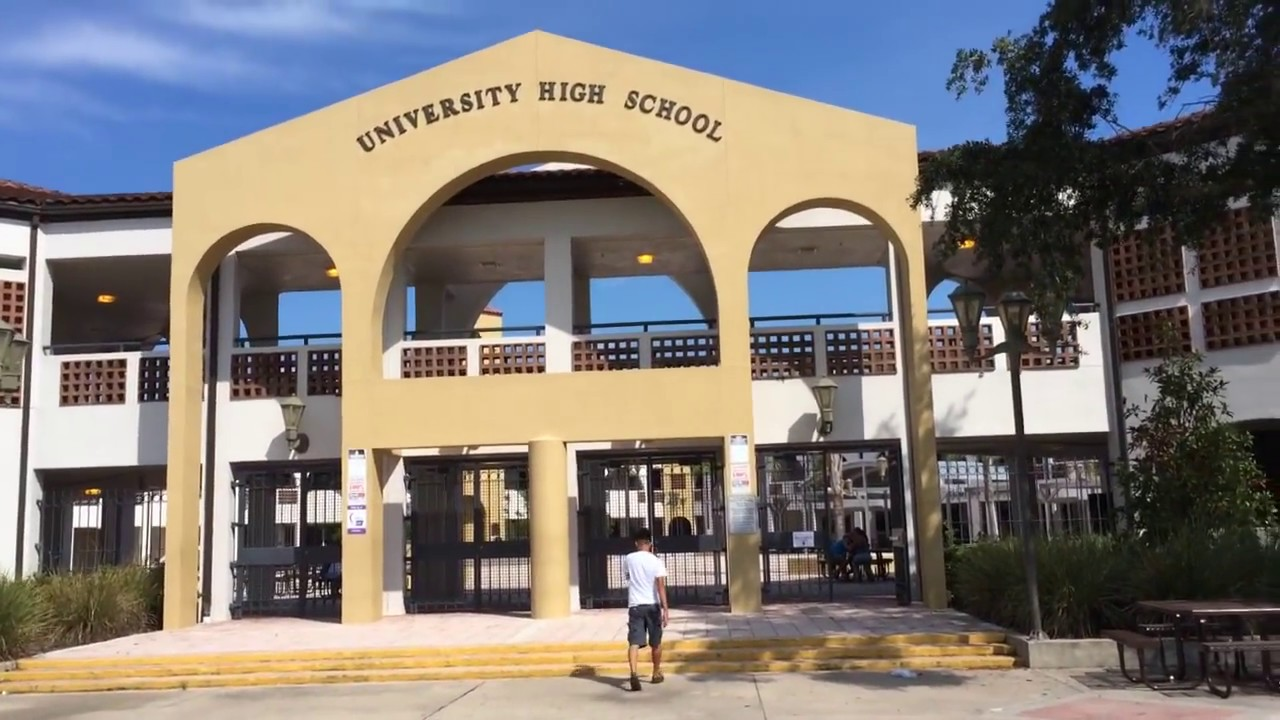
University's entrance.

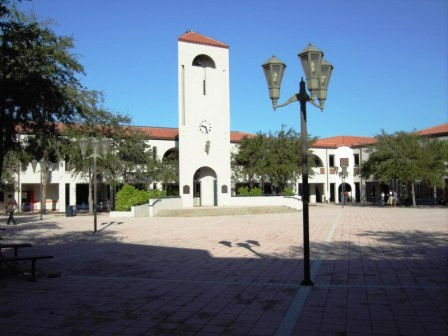
University back in 1999.

The school is notable for the 2006 stabbing death of a student at the bus loop after class.

== Performing Arts ==
=== Theatre ===
University High School has been noted as one of the best theatre and technical theatre departments in Florida. They have performed several popular plays and musicals throughout the years such as Into the Woods, A Man of No Importance, The Hunchback of Notre Dame, West Side Story, Les Misérables, Ragtime, Carousel, Evita, Aida, Miss Saigon, The Wiz, Beauty and the Beast, Shrek, Guys and Dolls and Sweeney Todd. University has presented Lend Me A Tenor in the fall of 2010, and was one of the first high schools in the world to put on a production of Phantom of the Opera in the spring of 2011.

The Drama Department also boasts a Thespian Troupe. Every winter, Troupe 4848 of District 5 hosts the District 5 thespian competition, and travels to Tampa for State competition. In the past, the Troupe's One Act, The Window School, won "Best in Show: One Act" and went on and received straight superiors at State in 2008. Silas Marner was presented in 2009, and received straight superiors at District and State competition. Troupe 4848 attended Districts 2010 and won straight superiors for their One Act, A Tulip For Lily. In 2011, Troupe 4848 entered Jesus Christ Superstar as their One Act in the District 5 competition, won straight superiors. In 2019, Troupe 4848 presented Silas Marner once again, and received superiors, and an additional fan favorite award. In 2020, Spoon River Anthology was presented, and also received superiors AND Top Honors for the Online Regional Festival. They also participate annually in the Applause Awards at the Dr. Phillips Performing Arts Center, an award ceremony created to recognize Central Florida high schools theatrical programs, technical crew, and individual actor performances.

=== Band ===
The University Band is recognized as one of the premier band programs in the state. The wind ensemble, symphonic band, big band, jazz ensemble, and marching band are all rated "superior" ensembles by the Florida Bandmasters' Association, and the program has earned the Otto J. Kraushaar Award, FBA's highest honor, six times.

The marching band is a three-time FMBC finalist, two-time BOA regional finalist, and has given numerous high-profile performances, including the National Cherry Blossom Festival Parade in Washington, D.C. (1995 and 2001), Macy's Thanksgiving Day Parade in New York City (1995), Tournament of Roses Parade in Pasadena, California (1998), Saint Patrick's Day Parade in Chicago, Illinois (2013), NATO Parade of Nations in Norfolk, Virginia (2015), and Saint Patrick's Day Parade in Savannah, Georgia in 2017.

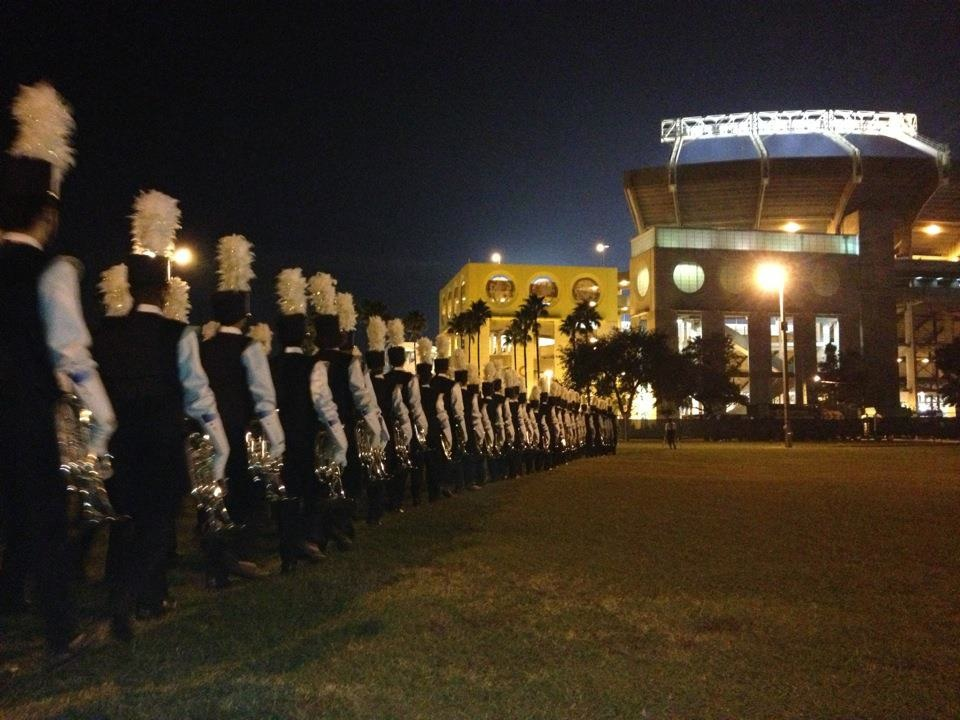
The University Marching Band entering the Citrus Bowl in Orlando, Florida.

The indoor percussion ensemble (formerly known as the University Percussion Syndicate) has a number of FFCC and WGI championship titles, was the Scholastic A Bronze Medalist at the 2001 WGI World Championships, and placed fourth in 2009. Recent field shows by the marching band include "Out of the Silent Planet" (2019).

An FMBC regional competition called the "University Classic" has been hosted by the band annually in October since 2004.

=== Dance ===
University has a new dance program that began the 2018–2019 school year. This program is now part of the Performing Fine Arts Magnet. Although being relatively new, the program has managed to perform multiple shows. This school year (2020–21) the University Dance Program put on in the Winter season, "On The Front Line", and in the Spring season, "Follow Our Lead".

Although this program is new, there have been other dance programs at UHS in the past: Sabor Latino was a student-directed Latin dance team that participated in the Orlando Latin Dance Expo. Sabor Latino lasted through graduating classes of 2007–2011.

=== Chorus ===
The University Chorus program, similar to both the band and theatre programs, has received recognition on the regional and state level. The program is a part of the Performing Fine Arts Magnet. Additionally, the chorus department and its teachers have been awarded frequently for their overall repute and esteem. It has also given many notable performances, with performances at Disney's “Grand Floridian”, “Boardwalk”, and on the national level, traveled to Kansas City, MO for ACDA (American Choral Directors Association).

The program also hosts a wide selection of different courses, with classes based on individual technique to classes for full choir singing. While limited for the 2020–21 school year, the program has put out multiple concerts, and still maintained its status of excellence, with students being placed into chorus’ on the county level.

== Notable alumni ==
- Dan Haseltine, lead vocalist of Jars of Clay
- Nick Goody, baseball player.
- Chris Parrish, professional water skier.
- Curtis Riley, NFL player.
- Cam Robinson, baseball player in the Tampa Bay Rays organization
- Justin Nicolino, baseball player.
- R.J. Swindle, baseball player.
- Nick Buchert, NBA referee.
- Anna V. Eskamani, Florida House of Representatives.
- Ricardo Hallman, cornerback for the Wisconsin Badgers
- Kelsey Anne Brown, Broadway performer

== Clubs and organizations ==
At the beginning of the year, the UHS Student Government Association holds the Club Rush event, a week where clubs and organizations advertise themselves to prospective members in the plaza.

Some clubs and organizations at UHS include Asian Student Association, Beta Club, Chorus, Colorguard/Winterguard, Debate, Future Farmers of America, Gay-Straight Alliance. German Club, International Thespian Society, JROTC which provides a way for students to establish a sense of citizenship and for the students to get a taste of what it would be like in the United States Marine Corps. Key Club, Latinos in Action, Marine Corps, Mu Alpha Theta, National Honor Society, Red Cross, Senior Class Cabinet, Science National Honor Society, Science Olympiad, Spanish National Honor Society, Student Government Association, TV Production, Best Buddies, Club 42 (a club in honor of a student who passed), and many others.

== Movies ==
- The school's stadium and junior parking lot were used as a backdrop for the 2007 film Sydney White.
- The University High School cheerleaders won the 2006–07 state championship and were featured in the 2007 film Bring It On: In It to Win It.
- University High School students were featured in an episode of MTV's hit show True Life: I'm Going to Prom.
