= Ricardo Hallman =

American football player (born 2003)

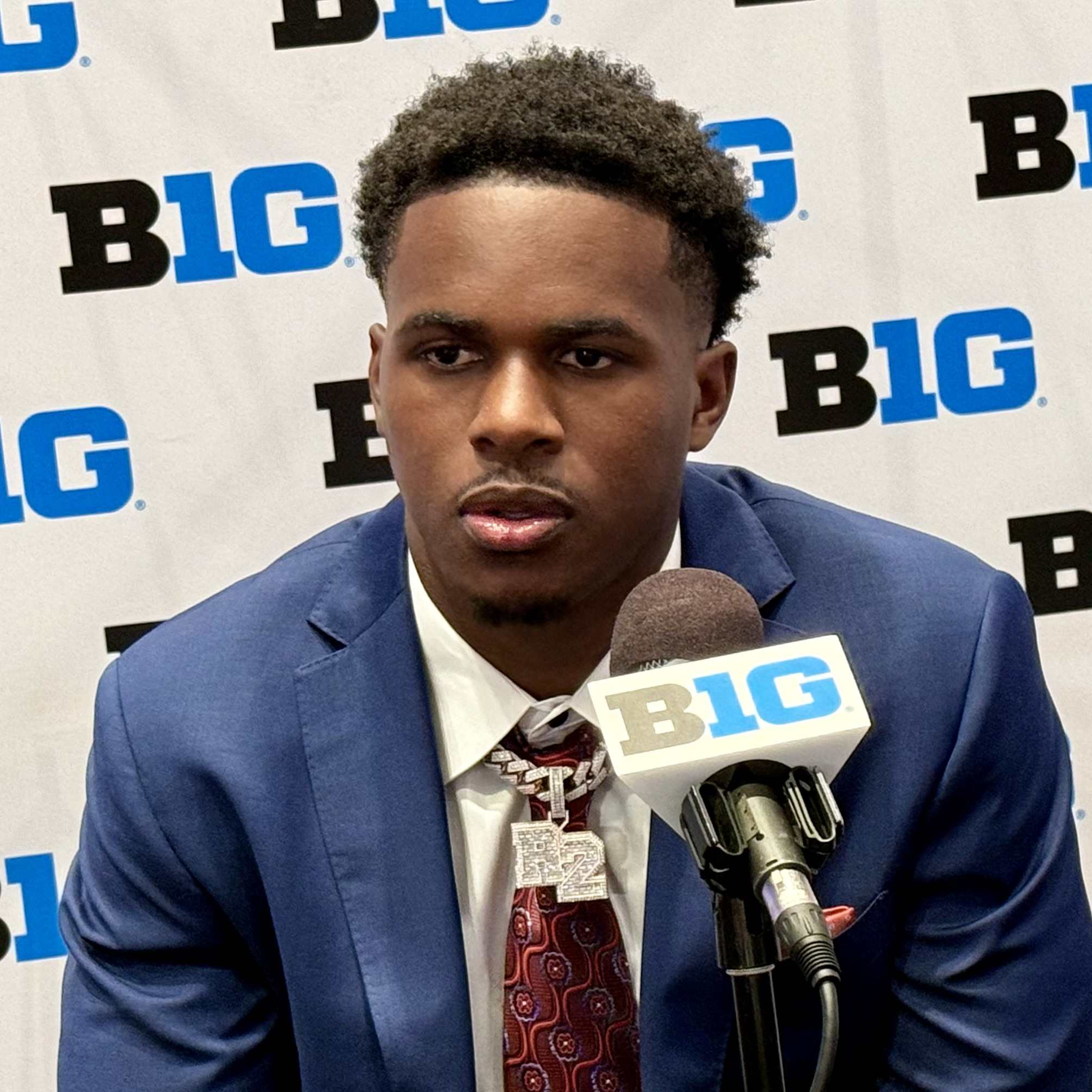
- Hallman at 2025 Big Ten Media Days

Profile
- Position: Cornerback

Personal information
- Born: July 30, 2003 (age 23); Miami, Florida, U.S.
- Listed height: 5 ft 9 in (1.75 m)
- Listed weight: 183 lb (83 kg)

Career information
- High school: University High School (Orlando, Florida)
- College: Wisconsin (2021–2025)
- NFL draft: 2026: undrafted

Career history
- Denver Broncos (2026)*
- * Offseason or practice squad member only

Awards and highlights
- Third-team All-Big Ten (2023)
- Stats at Pro Football Reference

Ricardo Hallman (born July 30, 2003) is an American professional football cornerback. He played college football for the Wisconsin Badgers and was signed by the Denver Broncos as an undrafted free agent in 2026.

== Early life ==
Hallman was born in Miami, Florida where he attended high school at University School. As a senior, he notched 17 tackles and eight interceptions. Hallman committed to play college football for the Wisconsin Badgers over offers such as Florida, Florida State, Miami, Michigan State, Ohio State, Penn State, and from Wisconsin.

== College career ==
As a freshman in 2021, Hallman recorded one tackle and a pass deflection. In week 3 of the 2022 season, Hallman recorded his first career interception bringing it down with one hand. Hallman finished the 2022 season with nine tackles with half a tackle being for a loss, three pass deflections, and an interception. In week six of the 2023 season, he intercepted a pass and returned it 95 yards for a touchdown, as he helped the Badgers increase their lead versus Rutgers. On October 19, 2023, Hallman was named a midseason All-American by CBS. Two weeks later in week nine against Ohio State, he notched a pass deflection and an interception.

== Professional career ==
Pre-draft measurables
Height	Weight	Arm length	Hand span	Wingspan	40-yard dash	10-yard split	20-yard split	20-yard shuttle	Three-cone drill	Vertical jump	Broad jump	Bench press
5 ft 9 in (1.75 m)	183 lb (83 kg)	30 3/4 in (0.78 m)	8 7/8 in (0.23 m)	6 ft 0 1/8 in (1.83 m)	4.55 s	1.58 s	2.61 s	4.38 s	7.22 s	37.0 in (0.94 m)	9 ft 7 in (2.92 m)	13 reps
All values from Pro Day

After going unselected in the 2026 NFL draft, Hallman signed with the Denver Broncos as an undrafted free agent on August 8, 2026. On August 30, he was waived by the Broncos as a part of final roster cuts.
