= Kenny Edenfield =

American football player and coach (born 1965)

Current position
- Title: Offensive coordinator
- Team: Gulf Shores HS (AL)

Biographical details
- Born: December 8, 1965 (age 60); Baton Rouge, Louisiana, U.S.
- Education: Troy University (1989)

Playing career
- 1986–1988: Troy
- Position: Wide receiver

Coaching career (HC unless noted)
- 1990–1992: Apopka HS (FL) (assistant)
- 1993: Nicholls State (QB/WR)
- 1994: Nicholls State (OC)
- 1995–1996: Dr. Phillips HS (FL)
- 1997–1998: Southwest Mississippi (assistant)
- 1999–2000: Southwest Mississippi
- 2001: Tulsa (TE/ST)
- 2002–2007: North Alabama (OC)
- 2008–2009: Troy (IWR)
- 2010–2014: Troy (OC/IWR)
- 2015–2017: Troy (co-OC/IWR)
- 2018–2020: South Alabama (OC/QB)
- 2021–present: Gulf Shores HS (AL) (OC)

Kenny Edenfield (born December 8, 1965) is an assistant football coach and former football player. He was most recently an assistant coach at the University of South Alabama.

== Playing career ==
Edenfield played collegiately at Troy University and is an alumnus of the university.

== Coaching career ==
=== High school career ===
Edenfield coached at Apopka High School in Apopka, Florida from 1990 to 1992 and Dr. Phillips High School in Dr. Phillips, Florida from 1995 to 1996.

=== College career ===
Edenfield was quarterbacks and wide receivers coach at Nicholls State in 1993 before being promoted to offensive coordinator in 1994. From 1997 to 1998, Edenfield was an assistant coach Southwest Mississippi Junior College and later head coach from 1999 to 2000. In 2001, he accepted a position as the tight ends coach and special teams coordinator at the University of Tulsa. He later served as the offensive coordinator at the University of North Alabama from 2002 to 2007.

From 2008 to 2009, Edenfield was inside wide receivers coach at Troy University. In 2010, Edenfield was promoted to offensive coordinator while still coaching inside wide receivers through 2014. From 2015 to 2017, he was co-offensive coordinator and inside wide receivers coach. In 2018, Edenfield moved to the University of South Alabama as offensive coordinator.
