= Colonial High School =

Public school in Orlando, Florida, US

Coordinates: 28.553511°N 81.304604°W

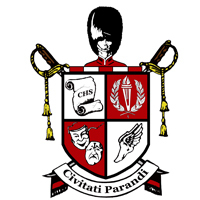

Location
- Main Campus: 6100 Oleander Dr; Freshman Campus: 7775 Valencia College Ln; Orlando, Florida; United States

Information
- Type: Public/magnet school
- Motto: "We are colonial and most of all importantly, It's Great to be a Grenadier!"
- Established: 1958
- School district: Orange County Public Schools
- Principal: Betzabeth Reussow
- Staff: 150.00 (FTE)
- Student to teacher ratio: 22.59
- Colors: Red and black
- Mascot: Grenadier
- Website: colonialhs.ocps.net

Colonial High School is a public high school located in Orlando, Florida, United States.

Colonial serves grades 9–12 within the neighborhoods of Azalea Park, Engelwood Park, Rio Pinar, Lake Fredrica, Ventura, Pershing, Vista East, Vista Park and parts of unincorporated Orange County.

== History ==
Colonial High School was originally built in 1958 as Colonial Senior High, named after the nearby SR 50 (locally known as Colonial Dr.) and serving as one of the first high schools in Orange County. It was originally built to serve grades 7–12, but in 1988 Colonial High began serving grades 9–12.

In 1990 University High School was built as a relief school, which later formed a rivalry with Colonial.

The main campus underwent total reconstruction in 2000, at a cost of $49 million with completion in 2004.

In 2009 Colonial celebrated its 50th anniversary, with the class of 2009 becoming its 50th graduating class.

During 2014 the school was ranked 90 out of 100 in the nation for its enrollment size, but as of 2016 its ranking has fallen to 114.

In the summer of 2018 Colonial began reconstruction of its performing arts center with completion for the 2019–2020 school year.

== Ninth grade center ==
After the transition from junior high schools to middle school in 1988, Colonial High School was assigned an added grade to serve. In response to the new enrollment size, a separate ninth grade center was built as a relief campus in what is now known as Waterford Elementary School. In the early 1990s, the 9th grade campus was moved closer to the original main campus, now located at 7775 Valencia College Lane, approximately three miles from the main campus.

In 2005 the ninth grade center underwent total reconstruction, with completion in 2006.

== Athletics ==
The school's athletic teams are known as the Grenadiers. They have won numerous Metro Championships over their more than 50-year history.

In November 2011, Head Coach Rene Plasencia and Assistant Coach Casey Calhoun led the boys' cross country team to a sweep of team titles culminating with the first State title of any sport in Colonial High School history. The team was led by junior standout Andres Arroyo who also won the individual title of 4A state champion.

Each year, Colonial High School and its rival, University High School, vie for possession of a stylized leather boot, the eponymous symbol of the much-hyped annual football game known as "The Boot Game". The winning school displays the boot in a trophy case until the following year, when the next Boot Game is played.

== Notable alumni ==
- Casey Anthony (2004), mother of Caylee Anthony and media sensation
- Andrés Arroyo (2013), middle-distance track athlete and competitor at 2016 Summer Olympics
- Delta Burke (1974), film and television actress
- Kevin Elliott (2007), former NFL wide receiver (Buffalo Bills)
- Mike Metcalfe (1991), former professional baseball player (Los Angeles Dodgers)
- Joel Piñeiro (1996), former MLB pitcher
- Dot Richardson (1979), two-time Olympic gold medalist in softball at 1996 and 2000 Summer Olympics
- Larry E. Smedley (1967), Medal of Honor recipient during Vietnam War, posthumously awarded honorary high school diploma in 2008 by school board

== Notable faculty ==
- Rene Plasencia, politician, social science teacher and track & field coach
- Buck Gurley, former NFL player, assistant football coach and defense coordinator
