= Lake Buena Vista High School =

Coordinates: 28.4035°N 81.4934°W

Location
- 11305 Daryl Carter Parkway; Orlando, Florida 32821; United States

Information
- School type: Public high school
- Established: 2021
- School district: Orange County Public Schools
- Principal: Maricarmen Aponte
- Teaching staff: 90.00 (on an FTE basis)
- Grades: 9–12
- Enrollment: 2,006 (2023-2024)
- Student to teacher ratio: 22.29
- Campus type: Suburban
- Colors: Carolina blue, scarlet, black
- Nickname: Vipers
- Website: lakebuenavistahs.ocps.net

Lake Buena Vista High School is a high school located in southwest Orange County, Florida, United States. It is located in the Lake Buena Vista area. Lake Buena Vista High School was built in 2021 as a relief school to reduce overcrowding in nearby high schools Dr. Phillips High School and Freedom High School. It is part of the Orange County Public Schools and serves grades 9–12.
