= Lemuel Jeanpierre =

American football player and coach (born 1987)

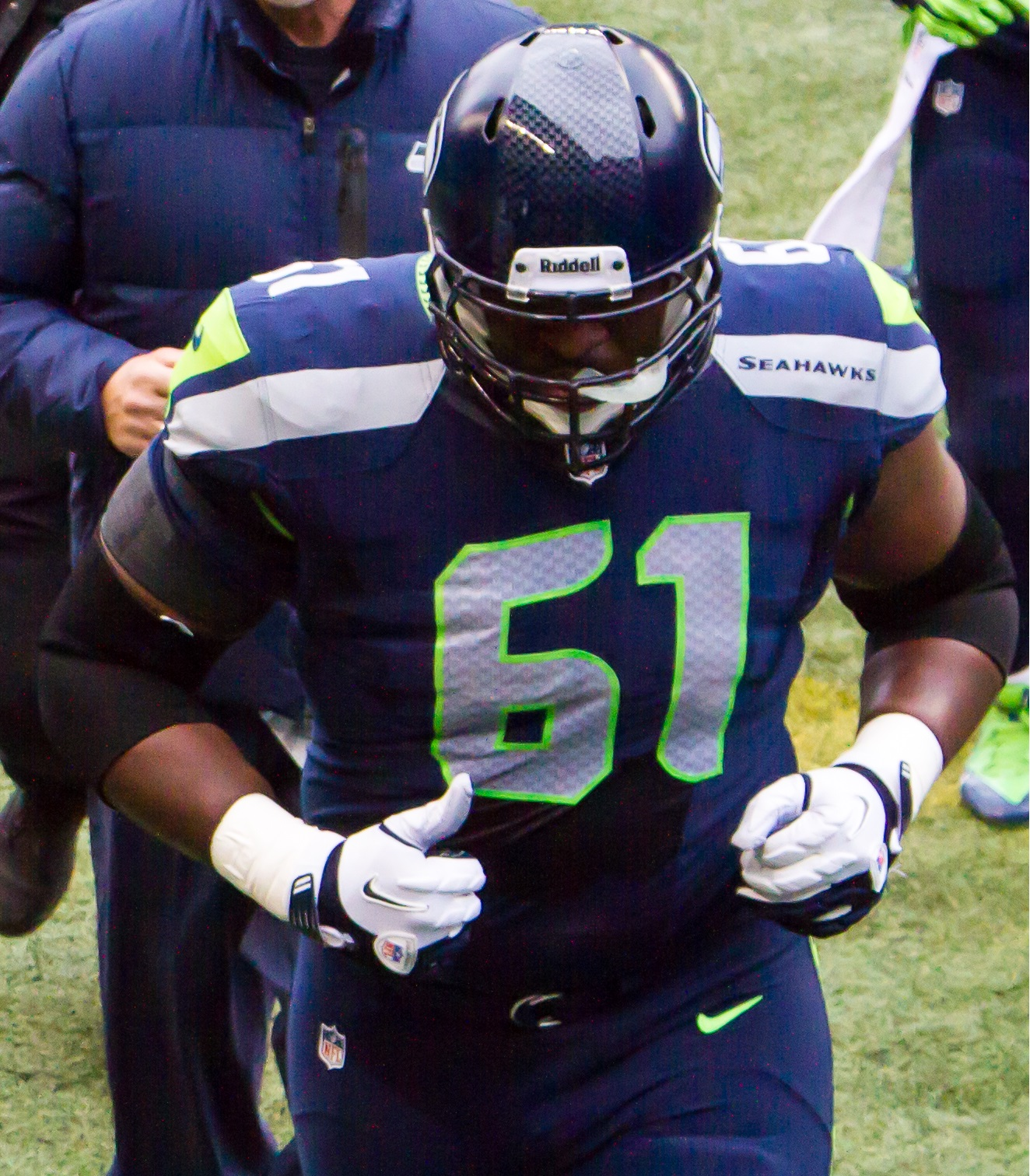
- Jeanpierre with the Seattle Seahawks in 2013

Miami Dolphins
- Title: Assistant tight ends coach

Personal information
- Born: May 19, 1987 (age 39); Marrero, Louisiana, U.S.
- Listed height: 6 ft 3 in (1.91 m)
- Listed weight: 301 lb (137 kg)

Career information
- Position: Guard (No. 61)
- High school: Timber Creek (Orlando, Florida)
- College: South Carolina
- NFL draft: 2010: undrafted

Career history

Playing
- Kansas City Chiefs (2010)*; Seattle Seahawks (2010–2015); Detroit Lions (2016)*
- * Offseason or practice squad member only

Coaching
- Seattle Seahawks (2017) Offensive assistant; Oakland Raiders (2018–2019) Assistant offensive line coach; Miami Dolphins (2020-present); Assistant offensive line coach (2020); Offensive line coach (2021); Assistant offensive line coach (2022-2025); Assistant tight ends coach (2026-present)

Awards and highlights
- As player: Super Bowl champion (XLVIII)

Career NFL statistics
- Games played: 63
- Games started: 11
- Stats at Pro Football Reference

Lemuel Jeanpierre (born May 19, 1987) is an American football coach and former player who is the assistant tight ends coach for the Miami Dolphins of the National Football League (NFL). In his playing career, he was a center for the Seattle Seahawks, having signed as an undrafted free agent in 2010. He played college football for the South Carolina Gamecocks.

== Playing career ==
Jeanpierre was signed by the Seattle Seahawks as an undrafted free agent following the end of the NFL lockout in 2011. Jeanpierre was originally released from the Seahawks before the 2014 season began. He was resigned in November after an injury to the starting center, Max Unger Jeanpierre became a free agent on August 31, 2015, after the Seahawks terminated his contract. Jeanpierre was re-signed by Seattle during Week 7 of the 2015 season after Patrick Lewis sustained an injury

On August 17, 2016, Jeanpierre signed with the Detroit Lions. On September 3, he was released by the Lions.

Pre-draft measurables
Height	Weight	40-yard dash	10-yard split	20-yard split	20-yard shuttle	Three-cone drill	Vertical jump	Broad jump	Bench press
6 ft 3 1/2 in (1.92 m)	301 lb (137 kg)	5.14 s	1.84 s	2.95 s	4.78 s	7.40 s	28.5 in (0.72 m)	8 ft 9 in (2.67 m)	30 reps
All values from Pro Day

== Coaching career ==
On July 28, 2017, Jeanpierre was signed as an offensive assistant by the Seattle Seahawks under head coach Pete Carroll.

On April 3, 2018, Jeanpierre was hired by the Oakland Raiders as an assistant offensive line coach under head coach Jon Gruden.

On February 20, 2020, Jeanpierre was hired by the Miami Dolphins to be their assistant offensive line coach under head coach Brian Flores. On January 19, 2021, Jeanpierre was promoted to offensive line coach. He was retained by Mike McDaniel as the assistant offensive line coach for the 2022 season.

On February 13, 2026, the Dolphins announced that they had retained Jeanpierre under new head coach Jeff Hafley.

== Personal life ==
Jeanpierre is of Haitian descent, whose grandfather migrated to Louisiana.
