= J. T. Wise =

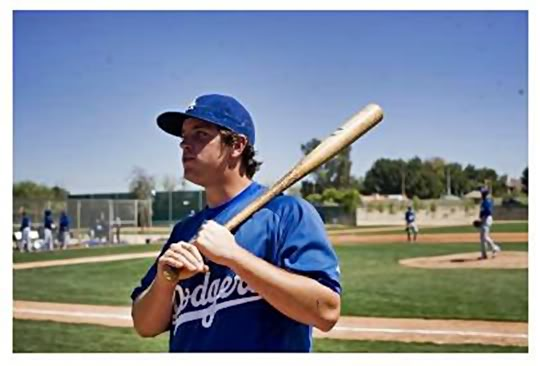
- First baseman/ Catcher
- Born: June 2, 1986 (age 39); Orlando, Florida, U.S.
- Bats: Right Throws: Right
- Stats at Baseball Reference

Jeremy Tyler Wise (born June 2, 1986) is an American former professional baseball player. He played as a catcher and first baseman in minor league baseball for the Los Angeles Dodgers organization. Wise attended Louisiana State University and later the University of Oklahoma. At both, Wise played baseball and won multiple accolades over his four-year combined stint. In 2009, Wise won the Johnny Bench Award, an annual award given out to the nation's best college catcher. He was drafted by the Los Angeles Dodgers in the 2009 Major League Baseball draft and started his professional career in their organization with the rookie-league Ogden Raptors.

== Amateur career ==
=== High school ===
Wise attended Apopka High School in Apopka, Florida. He played catcher, pitcher, and infielder. In all of his four years at Apopka, Wise lettered in baseball. Wise also played linebacker on the school's football team. In all of his four seasons at Apopka, the baseball team won the district championship. Wise was named the Most Valuable Player of the Florida State All-Star Game. Along with his father Sonny Wise, J.T. Wise was inducted into the Metro Conference Hall of Fame. Wise was also an honor roll student in the classroom.

=== College ===
==== Louisiana State University ====
During his freshman season at Louisiana State University, Wise started 58 of his 59 games played. He batted .299 with 66 hits, 13 doubles, 11 home runs, and 40 runs batted in (RBIs). Wise was awarded the Freshman of the Week Award on March 13, 2006. After the season, he was named to the Freshman All-Southeastern Conference team and the Collegiate Baseball Freshman All-American team. In his sophomore season, Wise batted .234 with 32 hits, nine doubles, three triples, two home runs, and 19 RBIs in 43 games played. During the summer of 2007, he played for the Harwich Mariners of the Cape Cod League. With the Mariners, he batted .261 with 16 RBIs in 29 games played. In the 2007 Major League Baseball draft, Wise was selected in the 45^{th} round by the Oakland Athletics, however, he did not sign.

==== University of Oklahoma ====
Wise transferred from Louisiana State University to the University of Oklahoma. He later stated that he transferred to Oklahoma so that he would get a chance to play catcher more often than he had at Louisiana. In his junior season, Wise played catcher and third base. On the season, Wise batted .278 with 66 hits, 18 doubles, two triples, seven home runs, and 49 RBIs in 60 games. In 2009, his senior and final season in college baseball, Wise played 61 games with the Oklahoma Sooners. He batted .359 with 75 hits, 13 doubles, 17 home runs, and 62 RBIs. On May 19, 2009, it was announced that Wise was named the Big 12 Player of the Year. Wise was also named to the first-team All-Big 10, second team All-American by Collegiate Baseball Newspaper, first team All-American by the National Collegiate Baseball Writers Association, and was a semi-finalist for the Golden Spikes Award. He also won the Johnny Bench Award, an annual award given to the best catcher in college baseball.

== Professional career ==
Wise was selected by the Los Angeles Dodgers in the fifth round of the 2009 Major League Baseball draft. Logan White, the assistant general manager for the Dodgers, stated that Wise was drafted so early because "...how he swings his bat and goes about the game, and he's hard-nosed, and I'd love to get him in the system." In his first season in professional baseball, 2009, Wise played for the rookie-level Ogden Raptors. He batted .338 in 26 runs, 49 hits, nine doubles, eight home runs, and 23 runs batted in (RBIs) in 39 games played. On the defensive side, Wise played 24 games at the catcher position and committed four errors in 222 total chances. Wise played the 2010 season with the Class-A Great Lakes Loons of the Midwest League and was promoted to the Advanced Class-A Rancho Cucamonga Quakes in 2011. With the Quakes he hit .286 in 97 games with 17 home runs and 73 RBI.

Wise was promoted to the AA Chattanooga Lookouts to open the 2012 season and was selected to the midseason Southern League all-star team. With the Lookouts, he primarily played first base. He was in 121 games and hit .278 with 9 homers and 70 RBI. He played with the Venados de Mazatlán in the Mexican Winter League during the off season. In 2013, with the Lookouts, he hit .245 in 106 games. He was released by the Dodgers in April 2014.

He subsequently signed with the Wichita Wingnuts of the American Association of Independent Professional Baseball. He hit .297 in 47 games for Wichita before he was signed to a minor league contract by the Texas Rangers, who assigned him to the AA Frisco RoughRiders.

== Personal ==
Wise was born on June 2, 1986, in Orlando, Florida, to Sonny and Mary Wise. J.T. Wise has one older brother, Nicky; and one older sister, Stacy. Wise's father, Sonny, was his baseball coach at Apopka High School. Wise is the great-nephew of former New York Yankees second baseman and 1960 World Series MVP Bobby Richardson.
