= East River High School =

Location
- 650 East River Falcons Way; Orlando, Florida 32833; United States

Information
- School type: Public high school
- Motto: Building a Legacy of Excellence
- Established: 2009
- School district: Orange County Public Schools
- Principal: Rebecca Watson
- Teaching staff: 92.00 (on an FTE basis)
- Grades: 9–12
- Enrollment: 2,006 (2023-2024)
- Student to teacher ratio: 21.80
- Campus type: Rural
- Colors: Red, silver, white
- Nickname: Falcons
- Rival: Timber Creek High School
- Website: eastriverhs.ocps.net

East River High School is a high school located in the Bithlo area of east Orange County, Florida, United States. It was built in 2009 as a relief school to reduce overcrowding in nearby Timber Creek High School and University High School. ERHS is part of the Orange County Public Schools and serves grades 9–12.
