= Aaron Jones (defensive end) =

American football player (born 1966)

No. 97
- Positions: Defensive end, linebacker

Personal information
- Born: December 18, 1966 (age 59); Orlando, Florida, U.S.
- Listed height: 6 ft 5 in (1.96 m)
- Listed weight: 267 lb (121 kg)

Career information
- High school: Apopka (Apopka, Florida)
- College: Eastern Kentucky
- NFL draft: 1988: 1st round, 18th overall pick

Career history
- Pittsburgh Steelers (1988–1992); New England Patriots (1993–1995); Miami Dolphins (1996)

Awards and highlights
- Inducted into KY Pro Football HOF (2015)

Career NFL statistics
- Sacks: 18
- Interceptions: 1
- Fumble recoveries: 5
- Stats at Pro Football Reference

Aaron Delmas Jones II (born December 18, 1966) is an American former professional football player in the National Football League (NFL). He went to high school at Apopka High School. He played as a defensive end and a linebacker for the Pittsburgh Steelers, New England Patriots, and Miami Dolphins. He was selected by the Steelers in the first round of the 1988 NFL draft with the 18th overall pick. His son Mike Jones played linebacker for the Michigan Wolverines football team.
