= Windermere High School =

Location
- 5523 Winter Garden Vineland Road; Windermere, Florida; United States; 28.4831°N 81.5809°W

Information
- Type: Public secondary
- Motto: Achieving Greatness with Honor
- Established: 2017; 9 years ago
- School district: Orange County Public Schools
- Principal: Andrew Leftakis
- Teaching staff: 129.00 (FTE)
- Grades: 9–12
- Enrollment: 3,156 (2023–2024)
- Student to teacher ratio: 24.47
- Colors: Navy blue, lime green and silver
- Mascot: Wolverine
- Rival: Horizon High School
- Website: https://windermerehs.ocps.net/

Windermere High School is a high school in Lake Butler, an unincorporated area located in the southwest portion of Orange County, Florida, United States, within the Orlando metropolitan area. The school is part of the Orange County Public Schools district.

Windermere High School was established to relieve overcrowding for nearby West Orange High School. Classes began for the 2017–2018 school year with an initial population of 2,776 students. Communities served by the school include sections of Lake Butler, the Orange County portion of Four Corners, and Bay Lake.

== History ==
The Orange County Commission denied a special exception application for the West Orange relief school project made by the Orange County School Board in 2013, while mediation between the parties occurred in 2014 and a settlement agreement was proposed at a public hearing in April 2015. Plans for the school's construction were approved by the county in May 2015.

Ground was broken for construction at the site of the school in a September 24, 2015 ceremony.

The school's name was chosen in favor of the options "Horizon High School" and "Lake Butler High School". The Windermere town council opposed the naming on the grounds that the school is not located within their town boundary, and other vocal opposition centered around the fact that few Windermere residents are zoned for the school which is located near the similarly named Windermere Preparatory School (a private school). The school mascot chosen was The Wolverines.

On August 14, 2017, Windermere High School opened to students.

In 2023, plans for an on-campus football field was approved. The football field was slated to open at the beginning of the 2024-2025 school year. After construction delays the Windermere high school football field held its first game on September 27, 2024.

== Academics ==
Windermere High School offers several educational pathways for its students based on their post-secondary educational and career goals, including a university pathway, a Valencia AA pathway offering dual enrollment at nearby Valencia College for students to achieve an Associate of Arts degree upon graduation from high school, and an industry certification pathway designed to prepare students for trade work.

=== Pre-Majors ===
The school offers eleven pre-majors, prescribed curricula of elective courses intended to expose students to their intended fields of post-secondary study. These include:

- Animal Science and Services
- AICE
- Biomedical Sciences
- Business Management and Analysis
- Digital Design
- Engineering
- Film & Broadcast
- Hospitality & Tourism
- Performing Arts (concentrations are offered for Theater, Band, Orchestra, and Dance)
- Visual Arts

Some pre-majors include courses resulting in students receiving industry certifications. The engineering and biomedical sciences pre-majors follow a curriculum set by Project Lead The Way.

== Incidents ==
On September 20, 2017, the school was placed on an approximately four-hour lockdown after a threat was sent by text message from two students, reading "Shooting at anytime today we are already inside Windermere High School be safe." The school was checked and secured by local law enforcement, who forced the school into a late dismissal. No weapon or threat was found and charges against the two students were dropped.

On November 15, 2017, the school was placed on lockdown again, for approximately three hours, after a parent received a text message saying, "There are guys in the bathrooms and hallways with guns in Windermere High School. We are afraid, please call 911 now." The school was checked by local law enforcement and no threat was found, letting the students out in a late dismissal.

On November 20, 2017, the school announced they were investigating a threat a student posted on Snapchat the evening before. Extra security was placed in the school the following day as a result.

On February 16, 2018, the school was placed on a brief lockdown after a threat was called in. The school started requiring students to show their student IDs upon entry starting February 26 following this incident, with students who fail to present an ID being re-directed to the front office to receive a visitor's badge.

On May 6, 2019, fake mandatory penis inspection letters began circulating throughout the school.

On November 4, 2019, a student intentionally set a soap dispenser on fire in a restroom on the third floor of one of the buildings. The school was placed on a hold as a result.

On January 9, 2020, a car crashed into a school bus carrying 21 students on its way to the high school. Both of the drivers were transported via ambulance to the hospital with minor injuries. None of the students were injured.

On March 11, 2020, a small restroom fire was reported on the first floor of a classroom building, which led to the school to being placed on a hold while the fire was extinguished.

On February 12, 2021, two people were seen jumping a fence to get inside the school, prompting the school to be placed on a hold while law enforcement officials responded. The hold was removed after law enforcement ensured the individuals were no longer on campus.

On August 17, 2022, a student was hit by a vehicle on school property after dismissal and was taken to the hospital with minor injuries.

On October 14, 2022, reports of a student being in possible possession of a weapon prompted the school to be placed on a brief hold. No weapon was found after a law enforcement search.

On December 2, 2022, two female students engaged in a physical altercation, the results of which prompted the fire department to be dispatched to check on the condition of one of the two students.

On August 20, 2023, a plumbing issue, caused by a lift station failure, led to the school releasing early at 12:45 PM, 95 minutes earlier than the usual 2:20 PM dismissal time.

On January 17, 2024, another student was struck by a vehicle on campus, prompting calls for safety changes. In the wake of this incident, the school announced changes to the parking lot traffic pattern for the following 2024-25 school year.

On February 26, 2024, a social media discussion was reported and investigated for a possible threat against the school. The threat was deemed “non-credible” by the following morning.

On September 24, 2024, a pipe burst in the 600 building, leading to students with classes in the building to be relocated to another building.

== Notable alumni ==
- Bryce Hubbart (2019), baseball player in the Cincinnati Reds organization
- Sean Stewart (2023 - transferred), basketball player for the Ohio State Buckeyes
