= Kristina Lavallee =

American pastry chef (born 1987)

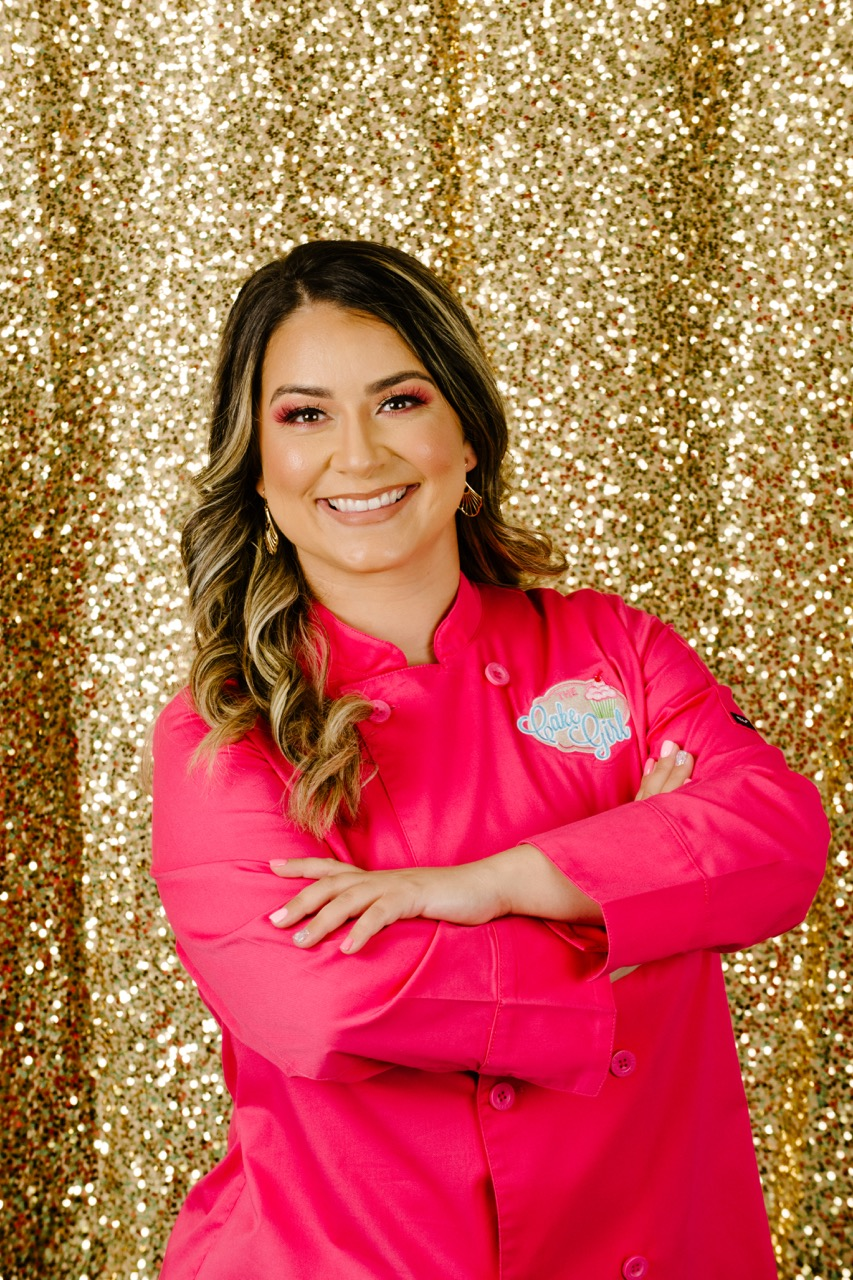
- Born: November 12, 1987 (age 38); Bayamón, Puerto Rico
- Education: University of Central Florida
- Occupations: Chef, cake designer, and entrepreneur
- Spouse: Kirby Lavallee (m. 2013)
- Awards: See Recognition
- Website: www.thecakegirl.com

Kristina Lavallee (born November 12, 1987) is an American chef, cake designer, and entrepreneur. She is the founder of The Cake Girl, a bakery based in Tampa, Florida.

== Early life and education ==
Lavallee was born in Bayamón, Puerto Rico, and raised in Vega Baja. Her mother, Margarita Perez, worked as a chef and caterer. She moved to Orlando, Florida, in 2002 and graduated from Timber Creek High School. In 2013, Lavallee earned dual bachelor's degrees in Hospitality Management and Restaurant and Foodservice Management from the Rosen College of Hospitality Management at the University of Central Florida.

Her work incorporates Puerto Rican desserts and family recipes.

== Career ==
Lavallee began selling baked goods in 2008 at farmers’ markets and festivals. In 2016, she launched a mobile dessert truck under the name The Cake Girl. In 2019, she opened a brick-and-mortar bakery in Tampa. Around this time, she introduced Crave’n Cups, a line of shippable cake jars.

In 2020, she released a pink-ribbon edition for Breast Cancer Awareness Month, with proceeds donated to the American Cancer Society.

In 2021, Lavallee participated in the National Football League’s Business Connect program as a vendor for Super Bowl LV at Raymond James Stadium in Tampa. In 2024, she launched a franchise program to expand The Cake Girl across Florida and other regions. She received a contract from the NFL to provide desserts for Super Bowl events as part of the league’s initiative to support local and diverse businesses.

Lavallee has produced sculpted and themed cakes. She has created custom cakes for public figures and professional athletes. In 2023, she made a goat-shaped cake commissioned by NFL player Leonard Fournette for Tom Brady’s birthday. In 2025, she designed a Hello Kitty-themed cake for Cardi B’s daughter.

She launched and leads Random Acts of Sweetness, a weekly initiative distributing cupcakes to first responders, healthcare workers, veterans, and underserved communities. The initiative has included collaborations with the City of Tampa, including the Tampa Police and Fire Departments and Mayor Jane Castor. She also coordinates Fill the Van, an annual holiday donation drive supporting foster homes, local families, and veterans.

Lavallee has served as a judge and presenting sponsor for the VooDoo Chef Baking & Pastry Challenge on RHSTV. She has spoken about her experiences as a Latina entrepreneur, including challenges with language-based discrimination, and in 2024 was a guest speaker at Working Women of Tampa Bay’s Women in Business Expo.

== Media appearances ==
Lavallee’s work has been featured in The Today Show, Telemundo’s Hoy Día, TMZ, WESH, Entrepreneur, and ESPN. She has appeared on ABC Action News’s Morning Blend and WTSP’s Great Day Live. Additional coverage includes Telemundo Al Rojo Vivo, American Cake Decorating Magazine, Southern Living, and Cheddar News.

She has appeared on the MJ Radio Morning Show, The Today Show during Hispanic Heritage Month, and demonstrated recipes on FOX 13’s Dinner DeeAs Dessert Week in 2025.

== Recognition ==
- Florida Winner, Sweetest Bakery in America (2019)
- WeddingWire Couple’s Choice Award (2022–2025)
- Winner, Dessert Wars Cake Showdown on Bake It Til You Make It (Food Network, Season 1, Episode 5)
- Finalist, Tampa Bay Business & Wealth Awards
- Multiple wins in Creative Loafing’s Best of the Bay, including Best Cakes and Best Cupcakes
- Honoree, Business Observer 40 Under 40 (2022)
- Nominee, Tampa Bay Business Journal’s Business Woman of the Year and 40 Under 40
- Recipient, Apogee Award from Tampa Bay Business & Wealth (2023)
- Recognized by the Hillsborough County Board of Commissioners for business contributions (2024)
- Named honorary commander at MacDill Air Force Base and recipient of the ESGR Patriot Award (2024)
- Named Inc. 500 Female Founder (2026)

She has hosted military spouse appreciation events and partnered with MacDill Air Force Base to provide baked goods for service members and families. Lavallee was also a featured vendor at the OC Emporium event in Orlando.

== Personal life ==
Lavallee met her husband, Kirby Lavallee, while attending the University of Central Florida. They married in 2013.
