= Orange County Public Schools =

School district in Florida, United States

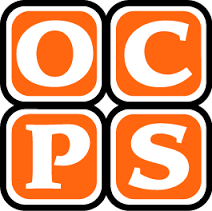

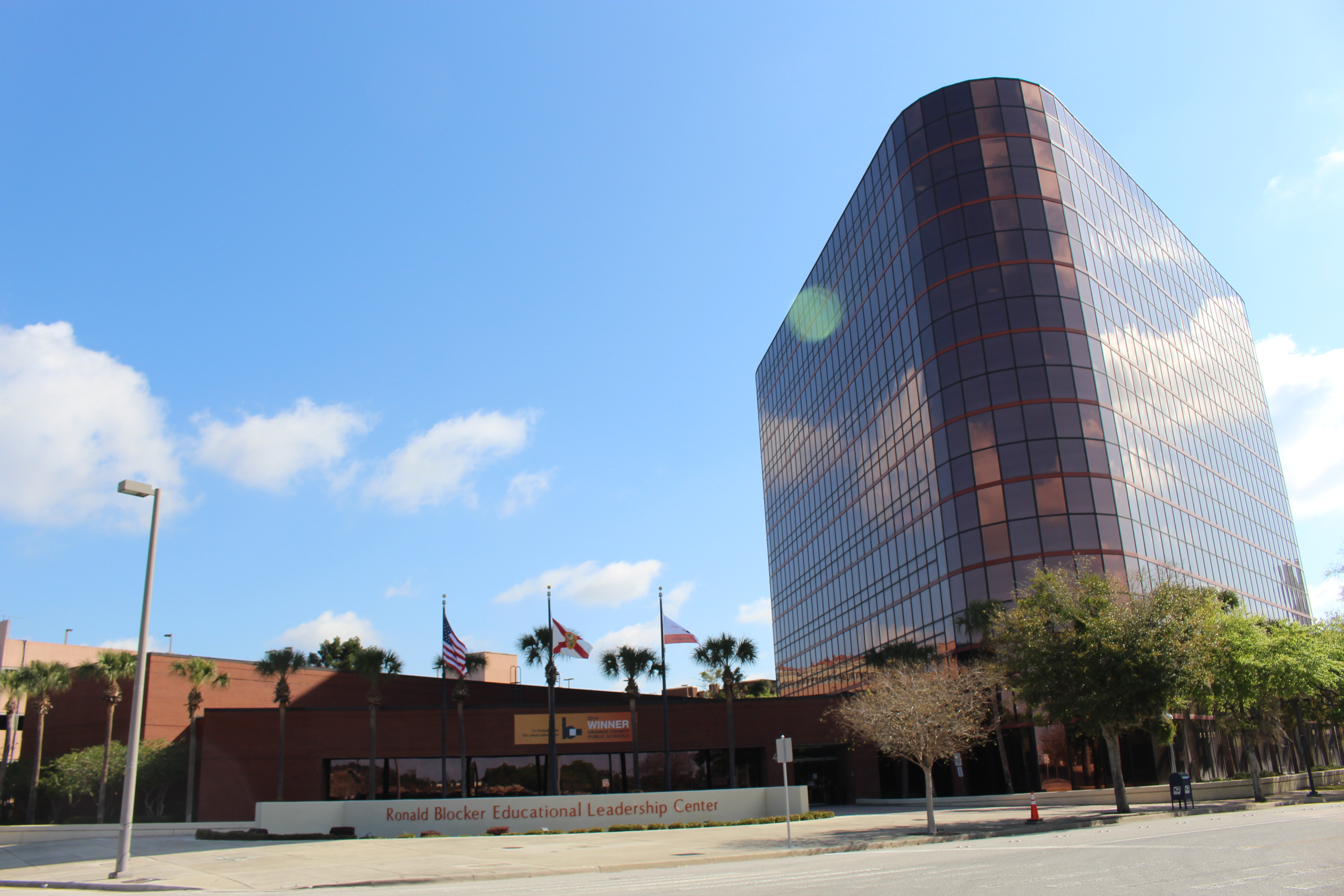
- Ronald Blocker Educational Leadership Center, the district headquarters

Address
- 445 West Amelia Street Orlando, Florida, 32801-1129; United States

District information
- Type: Public school district
- Superintendent: Maria F. Vazquez
- Deputy superintendent(s): Jose T. Martinez, Bridget Williams
- Chair of the board: Angie Gallo

Other information
- Website: www.ocps.net

Orange County Public Schools (OCPS) is the public school district for Orange County, Florida. It is based in the Ronald Blocker Educational Leadership Center in downtown Orlando. OCPS is the eighth-largest school district in the United States and the fourth-largest in Florida. The district serves about 209,000 students at 210 schools and is one of the largest employers in Central Florida with more than 23,000 team members. For 2026, the Florida Department of Education awarded OCPS with a district grade of A, previously earned in 2025, 2024, 2019, and 2010.

== School board ==
The superintendent of Orange County Public Schools is Maria Vazquez, appointed by the Orange County School Board. The district is overseen by the Orange County School Board, a body of seven elected officers, each board member sitting for a particular geographic district. School board districts are not analogous in any way with city or county commission districts. As of 2026, the current school board members, in order of district number, are Melissa Lopez Marantes, Gloria Reina O'Neal, Susanne Peña, Anne Douglas, Vicki-Elaine Felder, Stephanie Vanos, and Melissa Byrd.

Board members are elected every four years with 8-year term limits as of July 1, 2023, with Districts 1 through 3 elected during midterm election cycles (next in 2030) and Districts 4 through 7 elected during presidential cycles (next in 2028). All school board elections in Florida are currently non-partisan.

A county-wide public vote in 2009 created the elected position of school board chair. Angie Gallo was elected in August 2026. Bill Sublette previously served from 2010-2018 and Teresa Jacobs from 2018-2026.

== Schools ==
OCPS has used an attendance model of kindergarten through grade 5 for elementary schools, grades 6–8 for middle schools, and grades 9–12 for high schools since July 1987. Before then, grade 6 was part of elementary school and grade 9 was part of middle school ("junior high" in OCPS prior to July 1987). As now required by Florida law, virtually all elementary schools have pre-kindergarten programs.

OCPS has 210 regular-attendance schools as of the 2026–27 school year: 130 elementary, 10 K–8, 40 middle, 23 high, and seven exceptional student education centers. The district also has an adult education system with six dedicated campuses and night classes at most high schools, four dedicated special education schools as well as a hospital/homebound program, and dozens of alternative education centers, including charter schools. Six of the high schools in OCPS have separate ninth-grade centers, three of them off-site of the main campus, built after the shift from K–6/7–9/10–12 to K–5/6–8/9–12.

OCPS schools offer a variety of advanced studies, magnet programs, and scholastic academies that allow students to specialize in particular subject areas. Students must apply by submitting an electronic application to the School Choice Services magnet office by a set deadline and gain acceptance in order to participate in most programs. Programs include Advanced Placement (AP), agriscience, artificial intelligence, aviation & aerospace, AVID, Cambridge AICE, criminal justice, culinary arts, digital media & gaming, dual enrollment, education, entertainment production, entrepreneurship, environmental sustainability, esports, finance, fine arts, first responders, foreign languages / dual languages, gifted academy, health sciences, International Baccalaureate (IB), international studies, healthcare, hospitality & tourism, laser photonics, law, leadership, medicine, nursing, performing arts, Pre-Advanced Placement (Pre-AP), Pre-International Baccalaureate (Pre-IB), sports management, STEM (science, technology, engineering, mathematics), technical theatre, veterinary animal science, and visual arts.

As of July 2023, the schools of OCPS are divided into seven groups called school cadres: Elementary, Middle/K-8, High, School Transformation, Exceptional Student Education, Career and Technical Education, and School Choice. In order to provide more direct support to schools from the district, schools are now grouped primarily by grade level instead of by geographic learning communities which were in place for over 20 years.

The district is in an aggressive expansion and school improvement project being fueled by a 0.5% sales tax option passed by the voters of Orange County in 2002. Skyrocketing land and materials costs, however, have outpaced faster-than-expected sales tax revenue increases and slowed progress. Many projects had been pushed back, and some had been cancelled altogether. An extension of the half-penny sales tax was passed in 2014 and again in 2024 for another ten years. Since 2003, OCPS has opened 69 new schools and renovated or replaced 134 schools.

Most paperwork distributed to students and parents by OCPS is available in both English and Spanish. Many such documents are also available in Portuguese, Creole, Haitian Creole, Arabic, Vietnamese, and Filipino due to the significant populations in Orange County that speak each language.

=== Elementary schools ===
- Aloma Elementary School (Eagle)
- Andover Elementary School (Star)
- Apopka Elementary School (Dolphin)
- Atwater Bay Elementary School (Stingray)
- Avalon Elementary School (Mariner)
- Azalea Park Elementary School (Panther)
- Baldwin Park Elementary School (Bobcat)
- Bay Lake Elementary School (Lion)
- Bay Meadows Elementary School (Koala)
- Brookshire Elementary School (Bulldog)
- Camelot Elementary School (Knight)
- Castle Creek Elementary School (Dragon)
- Castleview Elementary School (Dragon)
- Catalina Elementary School (Colt)
- Cheney Elementary School (Viking)
- Citrus Elementary School (Honey Bee)
- Clay Springs Elementary School (Black Bear)
- Columbia Elementary School (Shuttle)
- Conway Elementary School (Cougar)
- Cypress Springs Elementary School (Hawk)
- Deerwood Elementary School (Eagle)
- Dillard Street Elementary School (Dragon)
- Dommerich Elementary School (Chief)
- Dover Shores Elementary School (Falcon)
- Dr. Phillips Elementary School (Flying Eagle)
- Dream Lake Elementary School (Dragon)
- Eagle Creek Elementary School (Panther)
- Eagles Nest Elementary School (Eagle)
- East Lake Elementary School (Eagle)
- Endeavor Elementary School (Navigator)
- Engelwood Elementary School (Cardinal)
- Forsyth Woods Elementary School (Buck)
- Frangus Elementary School (Cat)
- Hamlin Elementary School (Husky)
- Hiawassee Elementary School (Hawk) formerly (Indian)
- Hidden Oaks Elementary School (Hawk)
- Hillcrest Elementary School (Hawk)
- Hungerford Elementary School (Hawk)
- Hunter's Creek Elementary School (Panther)
- Independence Elementary School (Eagle)
- Innovation Elementary School (Trailblazer)
- Ivey Lane Elementary School (Knight)
- John Young Elementary School (Eagle)
- Keenes Crossing Elementary School (Cougar)
- Killarney Elementary School (Shamrock)
- Lake Gem Elementary School (Giant)
- Lake George Elementary School (Giraffe)
- Lake Silver Elementary School (Tiger)
- Lake Sybelia Elementary School (Dolphin)
- Lake Weston Elementary School (Mustang)
- Lake Whitney Elementary School (Dolphin)
- Lakemont Elementary School (Leopard)
- Lakeville Elementary School (Engineer)
- Lancaster Elementary School (Tiger)
- Laureate Park Elementary School (Longhorn)
- Lawton Chiles Elementary School (Raccoon)
- Little River Elementary School (Dolphin)
- Lockhart Elementary School (Dolphin)
- Lovell Elementary School (Wildcat)
- Luminary Elementary School (Wolf)
- Maxey Elementary School (Wildcat)
- MetroWest Elementary School (Orca)
- Millennia Elementary School (Kangaroo)
- Millennia Gardens Elementary School (Wallaby)
- Mollie Ray Elementary School (Lion)
- Moss Park Elementary School (Eagle)
- Northlake Park Community Elementary School (Buck)
- Oak Hill Elementary School (Eagle)
- Oakshire Elementary School (Shark)
- Ocoee Elementary School (Cardinal)
- Ovation Elementary School (Flamingo)
- Palm Lake Elementary School (Bobcat)
- Palmetto Elementary School (Panther)
- Panther Lake Elementary School (Panther)
- Pinar Elementary School (Pirate)
- Pine Hills Elementary School (Panther)
- Pineloch Elementary School (Panther)
- Pinewood Elementary School (Panther)
- Prairie Lake Elementary School (Panther)
- Princeton Elementary School (Panther)
- Ridgewood Park Elementary School (Tiger)
- Riverdale Elementary School (Royal)
- Riverside Elementary School (Roadrunner)
- Rock Lake Elementary School (Beaver)
- Rock Springs Elementary School (Rocket)
- Rolling Hills Elementary School (Cadet)
- Rosemont Elementary School (Eagle)
- Sadler Elementary School (Mustang)
- Sally Ride Elementary School (Explorer)
- Sand Lake Elementary School (Stingray)
- Shenandoah Elementary School (Bobcat)
- Shingle Creek Elementary School (Panda)
- Southwood Elementary School (Cub)
- Spring Lake Elementary School (Blue Jay)
- Stone Lakes Elementary School (Eagle)
- Stonewyck Elementary School (Gryphon)
- Summerlake Elementary School (Alligator)
- Sun Blaze Elementary School (Stingray)
- SunRidge Elementary School (Eaglet)
- Sunrise Elementary School (Eagle)
- Sunset Park Elementary School (Eagle)
- Sunshine Elementary School (Sunray)
- Tangelo Park Elementary School (Tiger)
- Thornebrooke Elementary School (Barracuda)
- Three Points Elementary School (Panther)
- Tildenville Elementary School (Tiger)
- Timber Lakes Elementary School (Wolf)
- Union Park Elementary School (Mustang)
- Ventura Elementary School (Tiger)
- Village Park Elementary School (Dragon)
- Vista Lakes Elementary School (Allstar)
- Vista Pointe Elementary School (Panther)
- Washington Shores Elementary School (Jaguar)
- Washington Shores Primary Learning Center (Panther)
- Water Spring Elementary School (Otter)
- Waterbridge Elementary School (Dolphin)
- Waterford Elementary School (Wildcat)
- West Creek Elementary School (Wildcat)
- West Oaks Elementary School (Wildcat)
- Westbrooke Elementary School (Wildcat)
- Westpointe Elementary School (Dolphin)
- Wetherbee Elementary School (Bumble Bee)
- Wheatley Elementary School (Panther)
- Whispering Oak Elementary School (Wildcat)
- Windermere Elementary School (Mustang)
- Winegard Elementary School (Patriot)
- Wolf Lake Elementary School (Wolf)
- Wyndham Lakes Elementary School (Owl)
- Zellwood Elementary School (Eagle)

=== K-8 Schools ===
- Arbor Ridge K-8 School (Eagle)
- Audubon Park K-8 School (Falcon)
- Blankner K-8 School (Bulldog)
- Kelly Park K-8 School (Panther)
- Lake Como K-8 School (Lion)
- OCPS Academic Center for Excellence (ACE) (Lion)
- Orlando Gifted Academy (** grades 2-8 only **) (Owl)
- Pershing K-8 School (Panther)
- Wedgefield K-8 School (Rocket)
- Windy Ridge K-8 School (Silverhawk)

=== Middle schools ===
- Apopka Memorial Middle School (Seahawk)
- Avalon Middle School (Husky)
- Bridgewater Middle School (Bobcat)
- Carver Middle School (Bear)
- Chain Of Lakes Middle School (Osprey)
- College Park Middle School (Bulldog)
- Conway Middle School (Falcon)
- Corner Lake Middle School (Eagle)
- Discovery Middle School (Explorer)
- Freedom Middle School (Panther)
- Glenridge Middle School (Scottie)
- Gotha Middle School (Grizzly Bear)
- Hamlin Middle School (Coyote)
- Horizon West Middle School (Hornet)
- Howard Middle School (Ranger)
- Hunter's Creek Middle School (Eagle)
- Innovation Middle School (Phoenix)
- Judson B. Walker Middle School (Viking)
- Lake Nona Middle School (Knight)
- Lakeview Middle School (Lightning)
- Legacy Middle School (Jet)
- Liberty Middle School (Patriot)
- Lockhart Middle School (Lancer)
- Luminary Middle School (Wolf)
- Maitland Middle School (Golden Hawk)
- Meadow Woods Middle School (Stallion)
- Meadowbrook Middle School (Mustang)
- Memorial Middle School (Soldier)
- Ocoee Middle School (Cardinal)
- Odyssey Middle School (Dragon)
- Piedmont Lakes Middle School (Chief)
- Roberto Clemente Middle School (Jaguar)
- Robinswood Middle School (Archer)
- South Creek Middle School (Wildcat)
- Southwest Middle School (Sea Lion)
- SunRidge Middle School (Eagle)
- Timber Springs Middle School (Wolverine)
- Water Spring Middle School (Wildcat)
- Westridge Middle School (Warrior)
- Wolf Lake Middle School (Wolf)

=== High schools ===
Prior to 1952, there were only two high schools in the City of Orlando: Orlando High School and Jones High School, which was a segregation-era Black-only high school until integration was enforced. Other municipalities in the county had high schools: Apopka, Florida; Winter Park, Florida; Ocoee, Florida; Winter Garden, Florida (Lakeview H.S.), and Eatonville, Florida (Hungerford H.S.).

In 1952, Orlando High was split into what became Edgewater High School and William R. Boone High School. Originally to be named "Orlando North" and "Orlando South", respectively, Orlando South took its modern name after its principal, William R. Boone, died before it opened. Orlando North took the name of the road it was built on, Edgewater Drive. The former Orlando High campus became Howard Middle School. Jones High moved to its present location in 1952, which was reconstructed in 2004.

In 1975, Ocoee High School and Lakeview High School were closed (their old campuses then housed Junior High schools of the same names) and their students went to the new West Orange High School. 30 years later, a new Ocoee High School was built and opened in 2005.

Robert F. Hungerford High School, founded in 1897 as the Robert F. Hungerford Normal and Industrial School in the historically black community of Eatonville, was renamed Wymore Tech and Wymore Career Education Center in the 1960s until it became the Hungerford Preparatory School in the late 1990s and operated as a district-wide magnet school without a specific geographic attendance zone. OCPS closed Hungerford Prep in 2009.

Approximately half of the district's high schools were opened after 2000, not including reconstructed campuses for existing schools.

- Apopka High School (1931) (Blue Darter)
- William R. Boone High School (1952) (Brave)
- Colonial High School (1958) (Grenadier)
- Cypress Creek High School (1992) (Bear)
- Dr. Phillips High School (1987) (Panther)
- East River High School (2009) (Falcon)
- Edgewater High School (1952) (Eagle)
- Maynard Evans High School (1955) (Trojan)
- Freedom High School (2003) (Patriot)
- Horizon High School (2021) (Hawk)
- Innovation High School (2024) (Bull)
- Jones High School (1895) (Tiger)
- Lake Buena Vista High School (2021) (Viper)
- Lake Nona High School (2009) (Lion)
- Oak Ridge High School (1959) (Pioneer)
- Ocoee High School (2005) (Knight)
- Olympia High School (2001) (Titan)
- Timber Creek High School (2001) (Wolf)
- University High School (1990) (Cougar)
- Wekiva High School (2007) (Mustang)
- West Orange High School (1975) (Warrior)
- Windermere High School (2017) (Wolverine)
- Winter Park High School (1927) (Wildcat)

=== Exceptional Education Schools ===
- ESE Transition (Gryphon)
- Esteem Academy (Phoenix)
- Hospital Homebound
- La Amistad
- Magnolia (Mustang)
- Silver Pines Academy (Falcon)

=== Alternative Education Schools ===
- Acceleration East (Phoenix)
- Acceleration West (Phoenix)
- Devereux Treatment Program
- Expecting Excellence Academy
- Juvenile Detention
- Juvenile Offenders Program
- OCVS Virtual Franchise (Charger)
- OCVS Virtual Instruction (Charger)
- Positive Pathways Transition Center
- Project Compass
- Randall Academy
- Simon Youth Foundation Academy
- Universal Education Center
- Village

=== Charter Schools ===
- Access (Lion)
- Aloma High (Gryphon)
- Aspire Academy (Star)
- Bridgeprep Academy (Bulldog)
- Central Florida Leadership Academy (Eagle)
- Chancery High (Bulldog)
- Cornerstone Charter Academy ES & MS (Duck)
- Cornerstone Charter Academy HS (Duck)
- Econ River High (Alligator)
- Hope (Eagle)
- Innovation Montessori Ocoee (Panther)
- Innovations Middle (Phoenix)
- Lake Eola (Panther)
- Legacy High (Eagle)
- Lucious and Emma Nixon Academy (Eagle)
- Mater Academy Narcoossee (Spartan)
- Oakland Avenue (Eagle)
- Olympus Academy (Owl)
- Orange Center STEAM Academy (Tiger)
- Orlando Science Schools (Orca)
- Passport (Panther)
- Pinecrest Academy Avalon (Patriot)
- Pinecrest Collegiate Academy (Shark)
- Pinecrest Creek (Lion)
- Pinecrest Preparatory (Shark)
- Princeton House
- Renaissance Charter at Crown Point (Royal)
- Renaissance Charter at Chickasaw (Bulldog)
- Renaissance Charter at Goldenrod (Lion)
- Renaissance Charter at Hunter's Creek (Warrior)
- Sheeler High (Lion)
- Sunshine High (Phoenix)
- UCP Bailes Community Academy (Bear)
- UCP East Orange (Hummingbird)
- UCP Immersive Learning Academy
- UCP Orange
- UCP Pine Hills (Panther)
- UCP Transitional Learning Academy High (Titan)
- UCP West Orange (Wildcat)
- Workforce Advantage Academy
