= Timber Creek High School (Florida) =

Public high school in Orlando, Florida

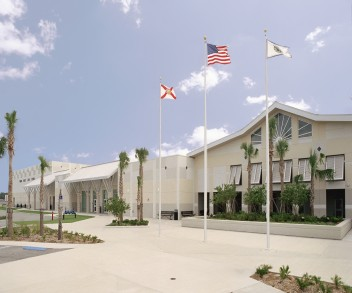

Location
- 1001 Avalon Park Blvd. East; Orlando, Florida 32828; United States
- 28.527032°N 81.148044°W

Information
- School type: Public high school
- Motto: Scientia, Prudentia et Honor
- Established: 2001
- School district: Orange County Public Schools
- Principal: Marc Wasko
- Teaching staff: 154.00 (on an FTE basis)
- Grades: 9–12
- Enrollment: 3,574 (2023–2024)
- Student to teacher ratio: 23.21
- Campus type: Suburban
- Colors: Purple, Silver and Black
- Mascot: Wolf
- Rival: East River High School
- Website: www.TimberCreekHS.OCPS.net

Timber Creek High School is a public high school located in Orlando, Florida, within the Orange County Public Schools system. Its primary mascot is a wolf, and its principal is Marc Wasko.

== History ==
Timber Creek High School was built in 2000 as a relief school for nearby University High School. John Wright, the founding principal, remained at Timber Creek until 2012 when he became the executive area director for the school system's East Learning Community.

== Athletics ==
Timber Creek has won state championships in baseball (2017), bowling (2006, boys and girls), boys volleyball (2009), volleyball (2008 Florida High School Athletic Association), and cheerleading (2009, 2010, 2012 and 2013).

=== Robotics team ===
In addition to winning the 2015 Florida State Championship and competing in the World Championship, the VEX Robotics team has won the following awards:

- Made VRC World 10 Years in a row
- 2023 Florida VRC State Championship Finalist
- 2016 Florida VRC State Championship: Tournament Champions
- 2015 Florida VRC State Championship: Tournament Champions and Tournament Finalists
- 2015 Battle in Brandon: Tournament Champions, Judges Award, Robot Skills Champion
- 2015 Space Coast Vex Robotics Showdown: Excellence Award, Robot Skills Champion, Programming Skills Champion
- 2014 Central Florida SKYRISE: Excellence Award, Innovate Award, Programming Skills Champion, Robot Skills Champion, Sportsmanship Award

=== Programming team ===
The programming team at Timber Creek High School competes in contests modeled after the International Collegiate Programming Contest. They attend contests at Stetson University, University of Central Florida, University of Florida, and Florida International University. In addition, they are members of the Florida High School Programming Series, USA Computing Olympiad, and the American Computer Science League. They also attend other online contests hosted by Codeforces, Topcoder, and CodeChef.

== Academics ==
Timber Creek, like most high schools, offers many Advanced Placement (AP) classes.

The APC (AP Choice) program is an advanced placement program for freshmen and sophomores. The APC program puts its students in classes with other APC students, and moves these classes at a faster pace than normal honors classes. It is intended to prepare the students for the AP courses that they will take in the future by increasing rigor and moving at the faster pace than normal honors classes. The APC program also requires the enrollment in AP Human Geography freshmen year to give the students a taste of AP classes. At graduation, if the students that were in the APC program have taken at least 6 AP classes during their high school years, they receive a special sticker on their diploma that recognizes them as an AP scholar.

Timber Creek also offers dual-enrollment at the local community college (Valencia College) and university (University of Central Florida), where students can take classes towards their high school diploma that may also count to their college degree.

=== Band program ===
On November 15, 2003, in only their third year of existence (and at their first appearance at the Florida Marching Band Coalition (FMBC) Championships), the Timber Creek Regiment was crowned FMBC Overall Grand Champion at the FMBC State Finals, the first band other than Cypress Creek High School (Orlando FL) recognized as "State Champions".

In 2009, the Regiment also had an undefeated season with their show Within. The Regiment has won numerous awards, such as best brass, best woodwinds, best colorguard, best effect, best percussion, etc. On November 20, 2010, the Timber Creek Regiment's performance of X: The Journey garnered them recognition as Class 5A Champions at the 2010 FMBC Championships, held at Tropicana Field, St. Petersburg FL (as of the 2005 marching season, FMBC no longer designates a "Grand Champion" at state finals). They also won this title in 2012 with their show "Two Sides". Recently, they won the 2021 FMBC State Championship with their show The Hill We Climb, based on the Poem by Amanda Gorman.

== Notable alumni ==
- Jacques Patrick, NFL running back for the Tennessee Titans
- Chris Board, NFL linebacker for the New England Patriots
- Jasmine Forsberg, musical theater actress
- Chase Stokes, actor
- Carrie Lawrence, professional soccer player for the Orlando Pride
- Kristina Lavallee, chef, cake designer, and entrepreneur
- Lemuel Jeanpierre, assistant offensive line coach for the Miami Dolphins
- Jeremy Pope, actor
- Grant Amato, murderer serving life imprisonment
- Ryan Carpenter, professional ice hockey player
- Patrick Starrr, founder of the beauty brand ONE/SIZE
