= National Register of Historic Places listings in Seminole County, Florida =

Location of Seminole County in Florida

This is a list of the National Register of Historic Places listings in Seminole County, Florida.

This is intended to be a complete list of the properties and districts on the National Register of Historic Places in Seminole County, Florida, United States. The locations of National Register properties and districts for which the latitude and longitude coordinates are included below, may be seen in a map.

There are 19 properties and districts listed on the National Register in the county.

This National Park Service list is complete through NPS recent listings posted January 30, 2026.

Contents: Counties in Florida (non-linked contain no National Register listings)
Alachua - Baker - Bay - Bradford - Brevard - Broward - Calhoun - Charlotte - Citrus - Clay - Collier - Columbia - DeSoto - Dixie - Duval - Escambia - Flagler - Franklin - Gadsden - Gilchrist - Glades - Gulf - Hamilton - Hardee - Hendry - Hernando - Highlands - Hillsborough (Tampa) - Holmes - Indian River - Jackson - Jefferson - Lafayette - Lake - Lee - Leon - Levy - Liberty - Madison - Manatee - Marion - Martin - Miami-Dade (Miami) - Monroe - Nassau - Okaloosa - Okeechobee - Orange - Osceola - Palm Beach - Pasco - Pinellas - Polk - Putnam - St. Johns - St. Lucie - Santa Rosa - Sarasota - Seminole - Sumter - Suwannee - Taylor - Union - Volusia - Wakulla - Walton - Washington

== Current listings ==
	Name on the Register	Image	Date listed	Location	City or town	Description
1	Bradlee-McIntyre House	Bradlee-McIntyre House	March 28, 1991 (#72000352)	130 West Warren Avenue; 28°39′50″N 81°22′04″W	Longwood	
2	Browne-King House	Browne-King House	September 20, 2001 (#01001023)	322 King Street; 28°40′18″N 81°12′50″W	Oviedo	
3	R. W. Estes Celery Company Precooler Historic District	R. W. Estes Celery Company Precooler Historic District	September 20, 2001 (#01001022)	159 North Central Avenue; 28°40′18″N 81°12′33″W	Oviedo	
4	First Methodist Church of Oviedo	First Methodist Church of Oviedo	July 18, 2007 (#07000743)	263 King Street; 28°40′20″N 81°12′48″W	Oviedo	
5	Georgetown Historic District	Georgetown Historic District	October 8, 2020 (#100005670)	East 2nd St., Mellonville, Celery, and Sanford Aves. 28°48′17″N 81°15′39″W	Sanford	
6	Hopper Academy	Hopper Academy	May 6, 2015 (#15000209)	1101 Pine Ave. 28°48′09″N 81°15′45″W	Sanford	
7	Lake Mary Chamber of Commerce Building	Lake Mary Chamber of Commerce Building	February 11, 2004 (#04000022)	158 North Country Club Road; 28°45′29″N 81°19′21″W	Lake Mary	
8	Longwood Historic District	Longwood Historic District	October 5, 1990 (#90001480)	Roughly bounded by West Pine Avenue, South Milwee Street, Palmetto Avenue and County Road 427; 28°41′57″N 81°20′54″W	Longwood	
9	Longwood Hotel	Longwood Hotel	May 10, 1984 (#84000963)	Old Dixie Highway; 28°42′01″N 81°20′52″W	Longwood	
10	Nelson and Company Historic District	Nelson and Company Historic District	September 20, 2001 (#01001010)	110-166 East Broadway Street and 30-110 Station Street; 28°40′05″N 81°32′53″W	Oviedo	
11	Old Fernald-Laughton Memorial Hospital	Old Fernald-Laughton Memorial Hospital	May 21, 1987 (#87000805)	500 South Oak Avenue; 28°48′27″N 81°16′10″W	Sanford	
12	Ritz Theater	Ritz Theater	January 29, 2001 (#00001130)	201 South Magnolia Avenue; 28°48′37″N 81°16′01″W	Sanford	
13	St. James A. M. E. Church	St. James A. M. E. Church	April 24, 1992 (#92000352)	819 Cypress Avenue; 28°48′16″N 81°15′50″W	Sanford	
14	Sanford Commercial District	Sanford Commercial District	June 15, 1976 (#76000606)	Parts of 1st, 2nd, and Commercial Streets, between Palmetto and Oak Streets; 28°48′42″N 81°16′03″W	Sanford	
15	Sanford Grammar School	Sanford Grammar School	November 23, 1984 (#84000253)	7th and Myrtle Streets; 28°48′20″N 81°16′15″W	Sanford	
16	Sanford Residential Historic District	Sanford Residential Historic District	December 15, 1989 (#89002119)	Roughly bounded by Sanford Avenue, 14th Street, Elm Avenue, and 3rd Street; 28°48′17″N 81°16′09″W	Sanford	
17	Nils M. and Beverly Schweizer House	Nils M. and Beverly Schweizer House	July 8, 2024 (#100010495)	213 Wood Lake Drive; 28°38′30″N 81°23′08″W	Maitland	
18	Seminole County Home	Seminole County Home	June 10, 1999 (#99000696)	300 Eslinger Way; 28°44′35″N 81°17′58″W	Sanford	
19	Wheeler-Evans House	Wheeler-Evans House	September 20, 2001 (#01001024)	340 South Lake Jesup Avenue; 28°39′57″N 81°12′45″W	Oviedo	

== See also ==
- List of National Historic Landmarks in Florida
- National Register of Historic Places listings in Florida
