= Stuart Fullerton =

American entomologist

Stuart M. Fullerton (March 8, 1940 – April 5, 2014) was an American entomologist and academic. Fullerton was the founder of the "Bug Closet", officially known as The Stuart M. Fullerton Collection of Arthropods at the University of Central Florida, which houses a collection of more than 500,000 mounted specimens of insects and other arthropods.

Fullerton was born in Modesto, California, on March 8, 1940. His interest in insects began while working as a staff member at a summer camp in the Sierra Nevadas. He later served in the United States Air Force. He was a graduate of the University of Central Florida.

He became a curator for a number of museums after leaving the Air Force, including institutions in Boston, Montreal, San Antonio and South Carolina. Fullerton also served as the curator of education for the Jacksonville Zoo and Gardens. He made frequent appearances on television news or children's shows with his animals.

Fullerton retired from the museums in 1990. He continued to amass a large collection of insect specimens after retirement. He relocated his collection a larger facility at the University of Central Florida (UCF) in 1993 at the invitation of David Vickers, the chairman of the Department of Biology.

Fullerton taught UCF entomology lab courses as a volunteer without receiving a salary. He established the Bug Closet, which houses more than a half million insects, many of which are indigenous to Central Florida. Fullerton sought to make the collection the definitive resource for information on insects in Florida. The Bug Closet also contains examples of insects from around the world, including Brazil and Mexico, but it remains dedicated to Central Floridian insects.

Fullerton collected insects found on the UCF campus and recruited undergraduate students to expand the collection. Two species housed in the collection were named in honor of Fullerton. Fullerton also oversaw the digitization of the Bug Closet collection, which made it available online from anywhere in the world. In 2012, Fullerton described Florida's native bees, or hymenoptera, as his favorite group within the Bug Closet.

Stuart Fullerton, a resident of Oviedo, Florida, died on April 5, 2014, at the age of 74.
