= Oviedo Mall =

Shopping mall in Oviedo, Florida, U.S.

- Location: Oviedo, Florida, U.S.
- Coordinates: 28°39′47″N 81°14′05″W
- Address: 1700 Oviedo Mall Blvd
- Opened: March 4, 1998; 28 years ago
- Previous names: The Marketplace at Oviedo Crossings (planning); Oviedo Marketplace (1998–2011)
- Developer: The Rouse Company
- Manager: International Growth Properties
- Owner: International Growth Properties
- Architect: ELS Architecture and Urban Design
- Num. of stores: 73
- Num. of anchor tenants: 3 (2 open, 1 undergoing redevelopment)
- Floor area: 952,035 square feet (88,446.9 m^{2})
- Floors: 1 with partial upper level (2 in all anchors, 1 in Zoo Health Center)
- Website: myoviedomall.com
- Building details

General information
- Status: Operational
- Type: Shopping mall (1998–present); mixed-use (2020–present)
- Construction started: March 1996; 30 years ago
- Completed: 1998

Design and construction
- Main contractor: CDI Contractors, LLC

Oviedo Mall (previously known as Oviedo Marketplace) is a single-story enclosed shopping mall located in Oviedo, Florida, a northeastern suburb of Orlando. The mall is owned and managed by International Growth Properties. As of the 2020s, its only operating department store anchor is Dillard's; one former anchor space previously occupied by Sears remains vacant.

The former Macy's space will be demolished and redeveloped into The Oasis at Oviedo Marketplace, a mixed-use development. Other major tenants include a D'Amico Italian Market, a Paul Mitchell cosmetology school, medical offices, and a Regal Cinemas movie theater. Oviedo Mall was developed by The Rouse Company of Columbia, Maryland, and was the firm's last enclosed mall development. Oviedo Mall is also planned to feature Lift 365 Fitness, replacing O2B Kids.

The mall has suffered from competition from other Florida malls (2000–2010), the COVID-19 pandemic (2020–2021), and the frequent closures of the mall's anchor stores (2000–2017). As a result, having struggled as a retail center, Oviedo Mall is undergoing redevelopment to transform it into a mixed-use development, though the mall itself won't be demolished.

== History ==
=== 1995–1998: Development and opening ===
Oviedo Marketplace was originally proposed as The Marketplace at Oviedo Crossings, but the Rouse Company scaled down the plan from larger ambitions following community and governmental input, including approval by the Seminole County Commission in September 1995 when Win Adams voted against the project, citing concerns about traffic congestion.

Rouse began construction of the 830,000-square-foot (77,000 m^{2}) enclosed mall in March 1996, with the importation of over 80,000 tons of dirt to create the foundation for the mall and parking areas. Elbasani & Logan Architects (ELS) was selected as the architect for the project, aimed at revitalizing Oviedo following the growing population of the city.

Construction for the Gayfers department store was scheduled to begin on December 16, 1996. Merchants were delayed from entering Oviedo Marketplace until its fire sprinkler system would be approved. The Orlando Sentinel noted that the mall had successfully passed critical inspections, and Rouse Co. officials were nearly ready for Oviedo Marketplace to begin operations. The mall was scheduled to have its grand opening at 9:30 a.m. EST on March 4, 1998.

However, The Rouse Company also noted that Oviedo Marketplace would continue to be a work progress, as more than 80 stores were still under construction, and that more than 20% of the stores would potentially not be ready on opening day. The 200,000-square-foot (19,000 m^{2}) Dillard's and Gayfers would be open to the public on March 4, but the 22-screen Regal Cinemas would need additional time for construction. City officials estimated an opening date of mid-March for the theater. Mike Bryant, vice president of The Rouse Co., stated that he would not be concerned if stores are not ready on the first day or the first month.

Oviedo Marketplace officially opened on March 4, 1998. At opening, the mall was approximately 80% leased and anchored by Gayfers and Dillard's department stores, along with a 22-screen Regal Cinemas theater. Early tenants included Barnes & Noble, a Foot Locker superstore, and FYE (For Your Entertainment).

=== 1998–2005: Early years ===
In September 1998, less than a year after opening, the Gayfers location was sold to Proffitt's, Inc., the company that owns Parisian following Dillard's acquisition of Gayfers' parent company, Mercantile Stores, Inc. and a related divestment agreement to avoid Dillard's from duplicating itself in Oviedo Marketplace. The Gayfers store reopened as Parisian on October 4, 1998.

Rouse expanded Oviedo Mall in the early 2000s; specifically, Sears opened a 110,000-square-foot (10,000 m^{2}) store in November 2000, with 80,000 square feet (7,400 m^{2}) of selling space, becoming Oviedo Mall's third anchor store. However, Parisian closed its doors in July of that year due to poor sales, and the former space was sold to Burdines, a local department store in Florida, which opened in November of that year.

Following Federated Department Stores' 2000s decision to consolidate all of its individual department stores into Macy's (except for Bloomingdale's), the store was later rebranded Burdines–Macy's on January 30, 2004. Federated then dropped the Burdines name entirely on March 6, 2005, and the Oviedo Marketplace store was converted to Macy's. Factors from the struggles included competition from the Seminole Towne Center, newer malls like the 1.3-million-square-foot (120,000 m^{2}) Altamonte Mall and nearby 1.1-million-square-foot (100,000 m^{2}) Waterford Lakes Town Center which opened in October 2000, exterior-facing entrances for some tenants that reduced interior foot traffic, and broader declines in enclosed mall retail.

General Growth Properties (GGP), a Chicago-based real-estate firm, acquired the Rouse Company in November 2004 and assumed ownership of Oviedo Marketplace. Bed Bath & Beyond relocated to an exterior site in 2009, citing the oversized nature of its interior space.

=== 2010–2017: Ownership changes and tenant evolution ===
During GGP's Chapter 11 bankruptcy, they sold the mall to CW Capital, a Los Angeles-based private real-estate firm, in 2010, and the property was renamed Oviedo Mall in June 2011 to better align with local branding and revitalization efforts. In 2012, John Paul Mitchell Systems opened a cosmetology school at the mall, occupying space originally intended for restaurant use. CW Capital sold the property to 3D Investments in March 2013. The former Bed Bath & Beyond space was later redeveloped into a gym, children's fitness facility, and O2B Kids preschool and afterschool center around 2013.

On February 16, 2017, 3D Investments sold Oviedo Mall to International Growth Properties (IGP) for $15.35 million. IGP promised renovations and new retailers to address ongoing vacancies. Earlier that year, Macy's closed its Oviedo Mall store permanently, as part of a plan to close 68 underperforming stores nationwide.

=== Early 2020s – present: Redevelopment ===
In the early 2020s, the City of Oviedo approved zoning changes allowing for a mixed-use redevelopment of the Oviedo Mall property. Approved concepts included residential units, hospitality, office space, and expanded commercial uses, such as the Orlando Orthopedic Center Oviedo, while permitting continued mall operations during phased redevelopment.

In 2025, Regal Cinemas completed upgrades to its Oviedo Mall theater, including updated seating and interior improvements, as part of efforts to modernize the moviegoing experience. The theater remains one of the mall's primary entertainment anchors.

Oviedo Mall is home to the only remaining B. Dalton bookstore, a legacy brand operated by Barnes & Noble; according to published reports, Barnes & Noble chose the Oviedo Mall location as part of efforts to reintroduce and rethink the B. Dalton format within its physical retail strategy.

The Oviedo Brewing Company ceased operations on February 28, 2025. O2B Kids Oviedo closed its doors in the summer of 2025 as part of a relocation, and is currently being replaced by Lift 365 Fitness, developed by First Capital Property Group.

In late 2025, the vacant Sears anchor space at Oviedo Mall was taken over on a temporary basis by Super Crazy Hot Buys, a discount retail tenant, while mall ownership and redevelopment planners continue to seek a long-term occupant for the anchor position. A dog daycare facility opened in the former Sears Auto Center called Dog Stop in early 2025.

The Oviedo Mall is also leaning back into its original 1998–2011 name, with the $100 million Oasis at Oviedo Marketplace project, led by Picerne Real Estate Group, will replace the former Macy's with 360-425 multi-family units. It will include 250 apartments, 175 senior units, and a 124-room hotel. Unlike The Oasis at Sawgrass Mills, which is entertainment-based, Oviedo Mall's "Oasis" is purely mixed-use. Despite receiving unanimous approval from the Oviedo City Council in December 2023, construction has faced delays and was still under city review for final resubmittals as of late 2025. On July 20, 2026, the now-$125 million project adding 700 new apartment units would move forward.

== Community use and events ==
By the 2020s, Oviedo Mall increasingly functioned as a multi-purpose community venue in addition to its retail role. The property has hosted established civic and nonprofit events such as Taste of Oviedo, Cops ’n Cars for Kids, and city-sponsored Independence Day celebrations, as well as seasonal markets and themed festivals.

The mall has also hosted specialty pop-up events including Renaissance fairs, artisan markets, and themed vendor gatherings such as Goblin Market, reflecting the use of flexible space for short-term programming and local businesses.

Event programming and marketing are overseen by the mall’s management team. As of the 2020s, these efforts have been led by the mall’s director of marketing and events, Josh Gunderson, whose role has been referenced in local coverage related to public-facing programming and redevelopment-era operations.

As part of its community-focused programming, the mall operates age-based initiatives for younger visitors. These include Kid Crew, a program for children ages 3–12, and the Mall Rat Club, a supervised teen program reintroduced in 2025. According to WESH 2 News, the Mall Rat Club was implemented to encourage structured, positive youth engagement within the mall environment.
