= Randy Fontanez =

American professional baseball pitcher

Free agent
- Pitcher
- Born: May 18, 1989 (age 36); Oviedo, Florida, U.S.
- Bats: Right Throws: Right
Medals
Representing Puerto Rico
Men's baseball
World Baseball Classic
Silver medal – second place	2013 San Francisco	Team

Randy Fontanez (born May 18, 1989) is an American former professional baseball pitcher who played internationally for the Puerto Rican national baseball team.

== Career ==
Fontanez attended Oviedo High School in Oviedo, Florida, and the University of South Florida, where he played college baseball for the South Florida Bulls baseball team. In 2010, he played collegiate summer baseball with the Yarmouth–Dennis Red Sox of the Cape Cod Baseball League. The New York Mets selected Fontanez in the 27th round of the 2011 Major League Baseball draft.

Fontanez pitched for the Puerto Rican national baseball team in the 2013 World Baseball Classic. At the 2014 Winter Meetings, the Los Angeles Dodgers selected Fontanez in the Class AAA phase of the Rule 5 draft. He appeared in 23 games across three minor league levels for the Dodgers organization in 2015 and was 3–7 with a 5.37 ERA (making 11 starts). He was released by the Dodgers in January 2016.
