= Sanford Residential Historic District =

Historic district in Florida, United States

- U.S. National Register of Historic Places
- U.S. Historic district
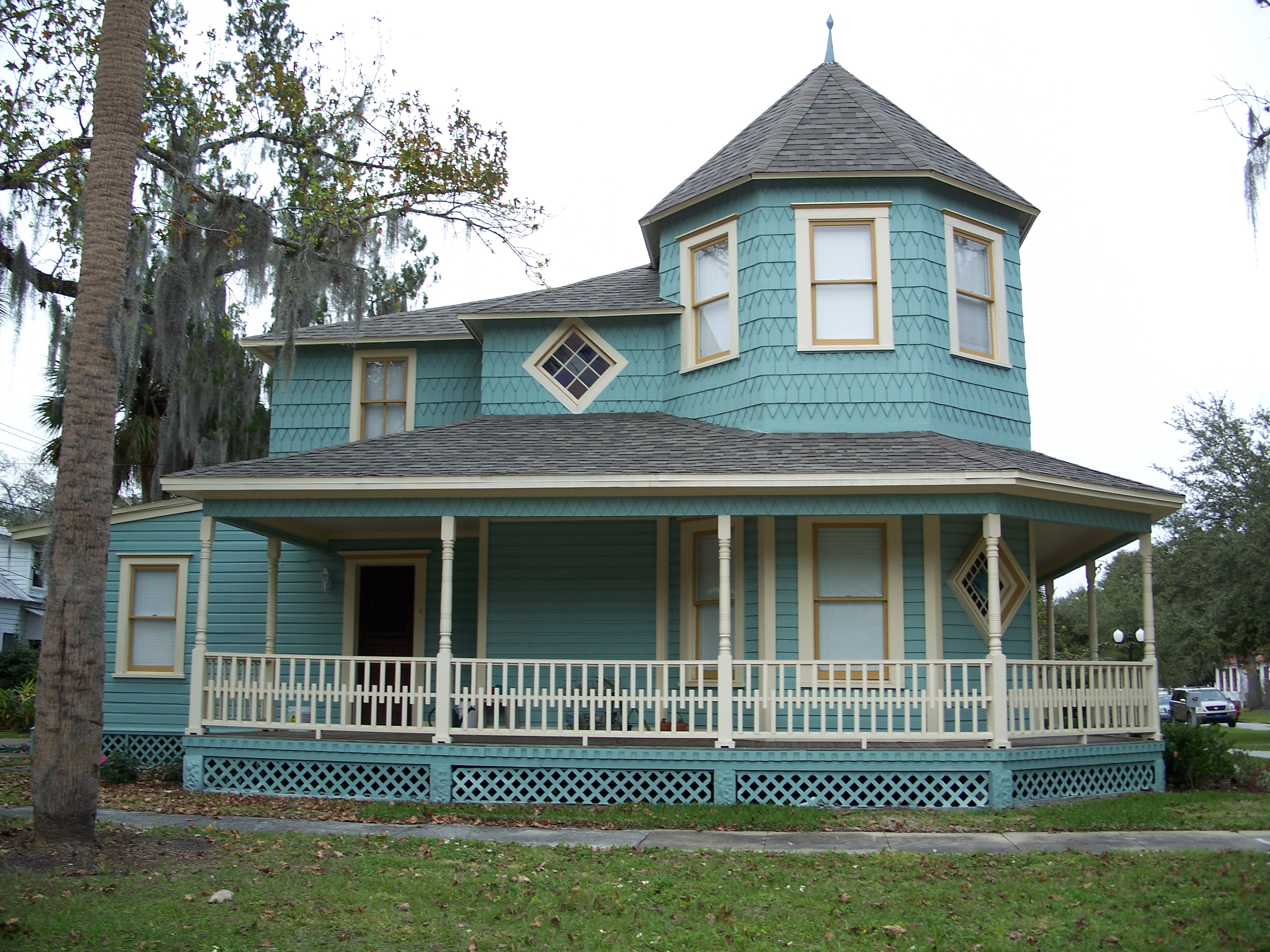
- House in district

- Location within Florida Location within the United States
- Location: Sanford, Florida United States
- Coordinates: 28°48′17″N 81°16′9″W
- Area: 2,500 acres (10 km^{2})
- NRHP reference No.: 89002119
- Added to NRHP: December 15, 1989

The Sanford Residential Historic District is a U.S. Historic District (designated as such on December 15, 1989) located in Sanford, Florida. The district is bounded by Sanford Avenue, 14th Street, Elm Avenue, and 3rd Street. It contains 432 historic buildings, including the Old Fernald-Laughton Memorial Hospital and Sanford Grammar School.

== Gallery ==
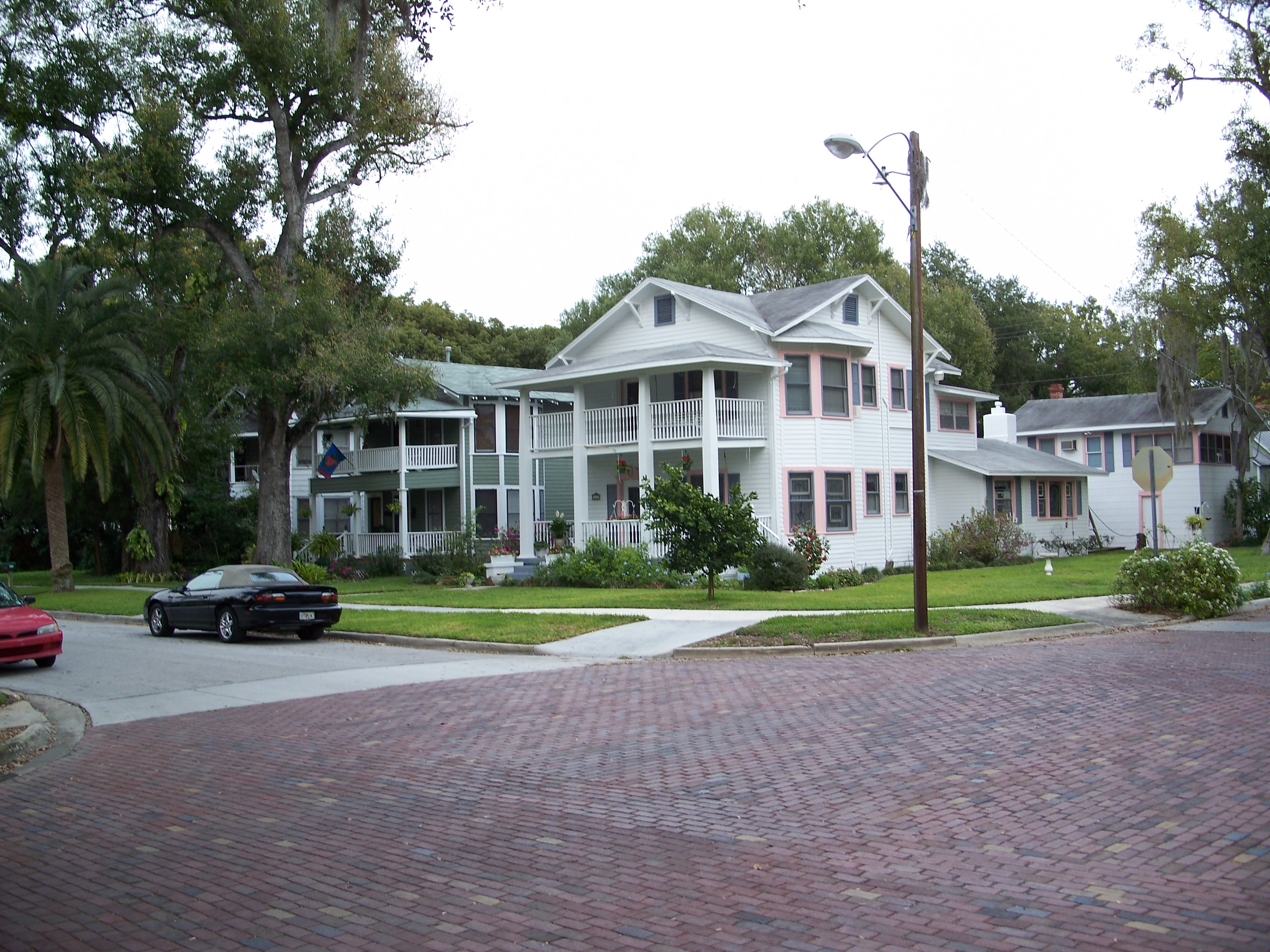
Houses in district
