= Browne-King House =

Historic house in Florida, United States

- U.S. National Register of Historic Places
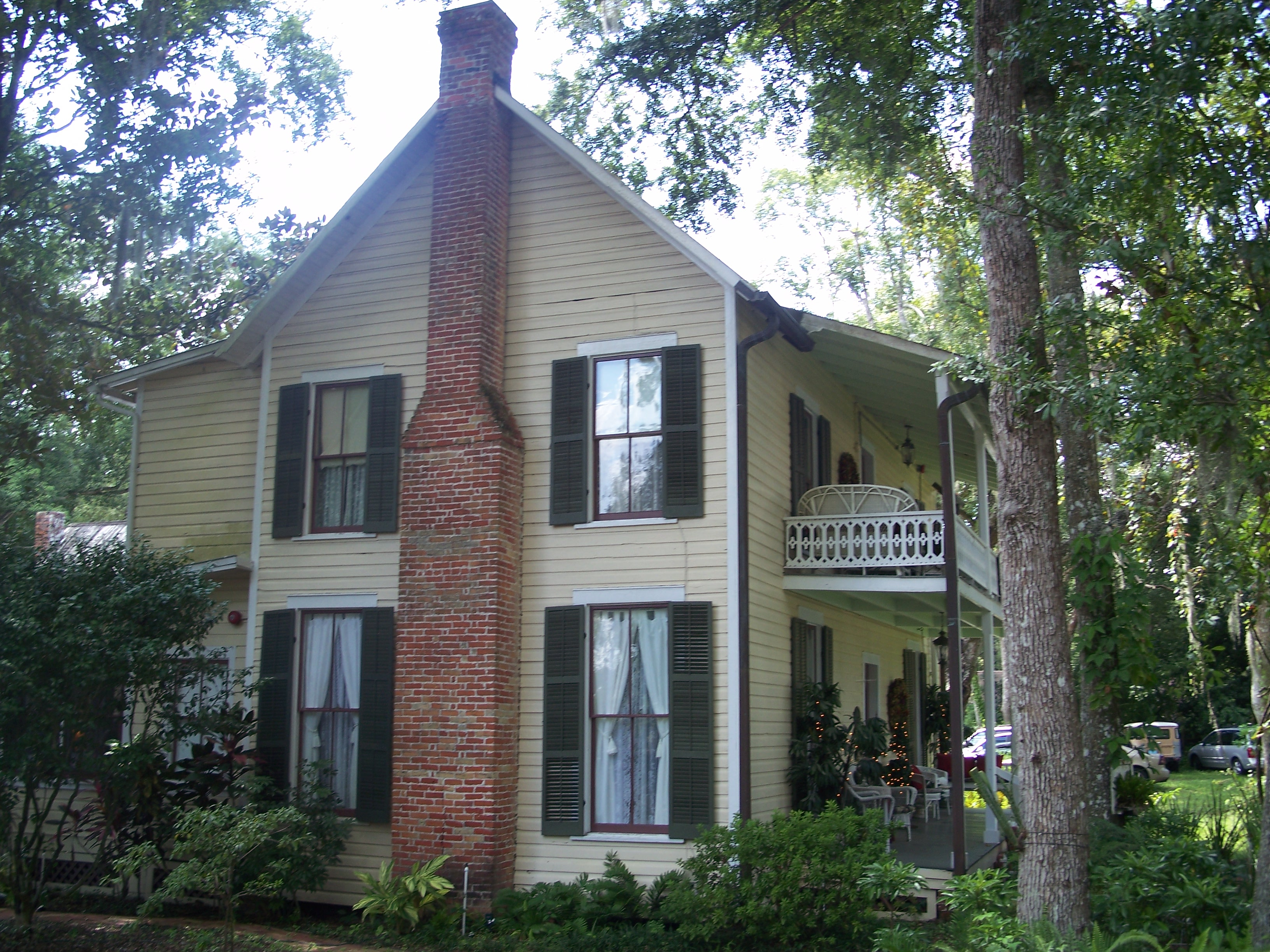

- Location within Florida Location within the United States
- Location: Oviedo, Florida
- Coordinates: 28°40′18″N 81°12′50″W
- Built: 1884
- Architectural style: Vernacular, I-house
- NRHP reference No.: 01001023
- Added to NRHP: 20 September 2001

The Browne-King House is a historic house located at 322 King Street in Oviedo, Florida.

== Description and history ==
It was added to the U.S. National Register of Historic Places on September 20, 2001.

== Gallery ==
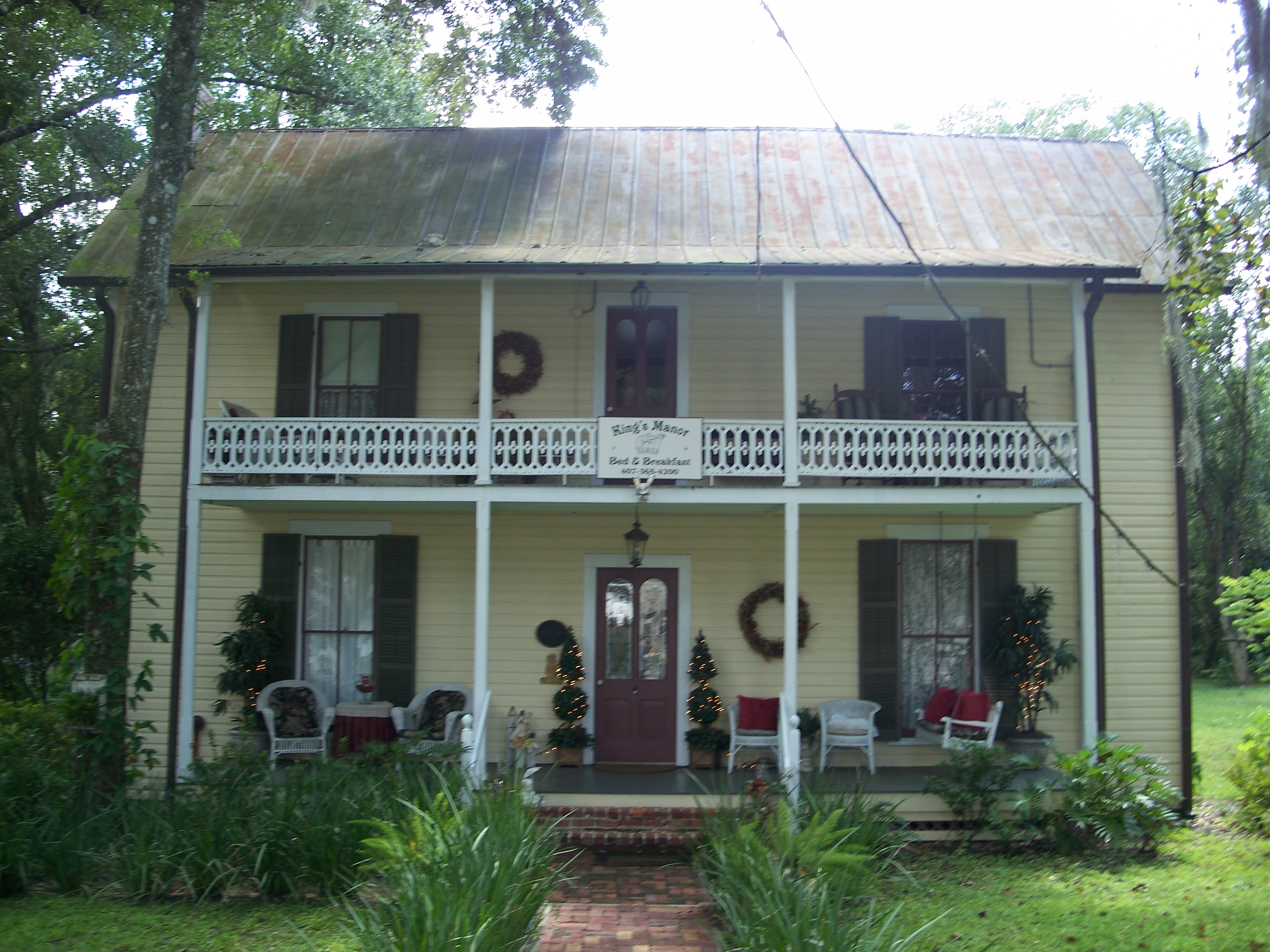

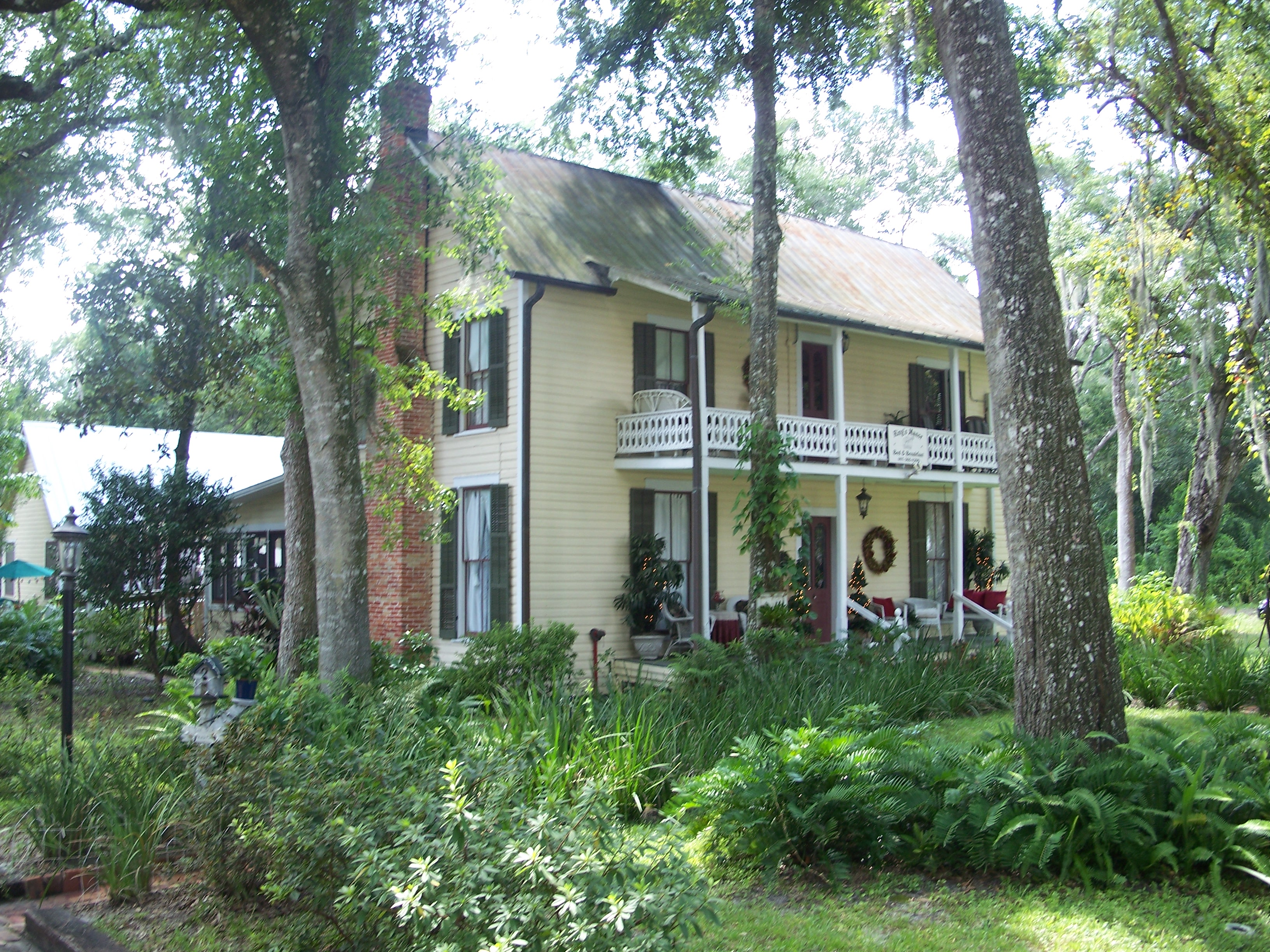
