= Seminole Towne Center =

Defunct mall in Sanford, Florida

Coordinates: 28.8033623°N 81.3392539°W

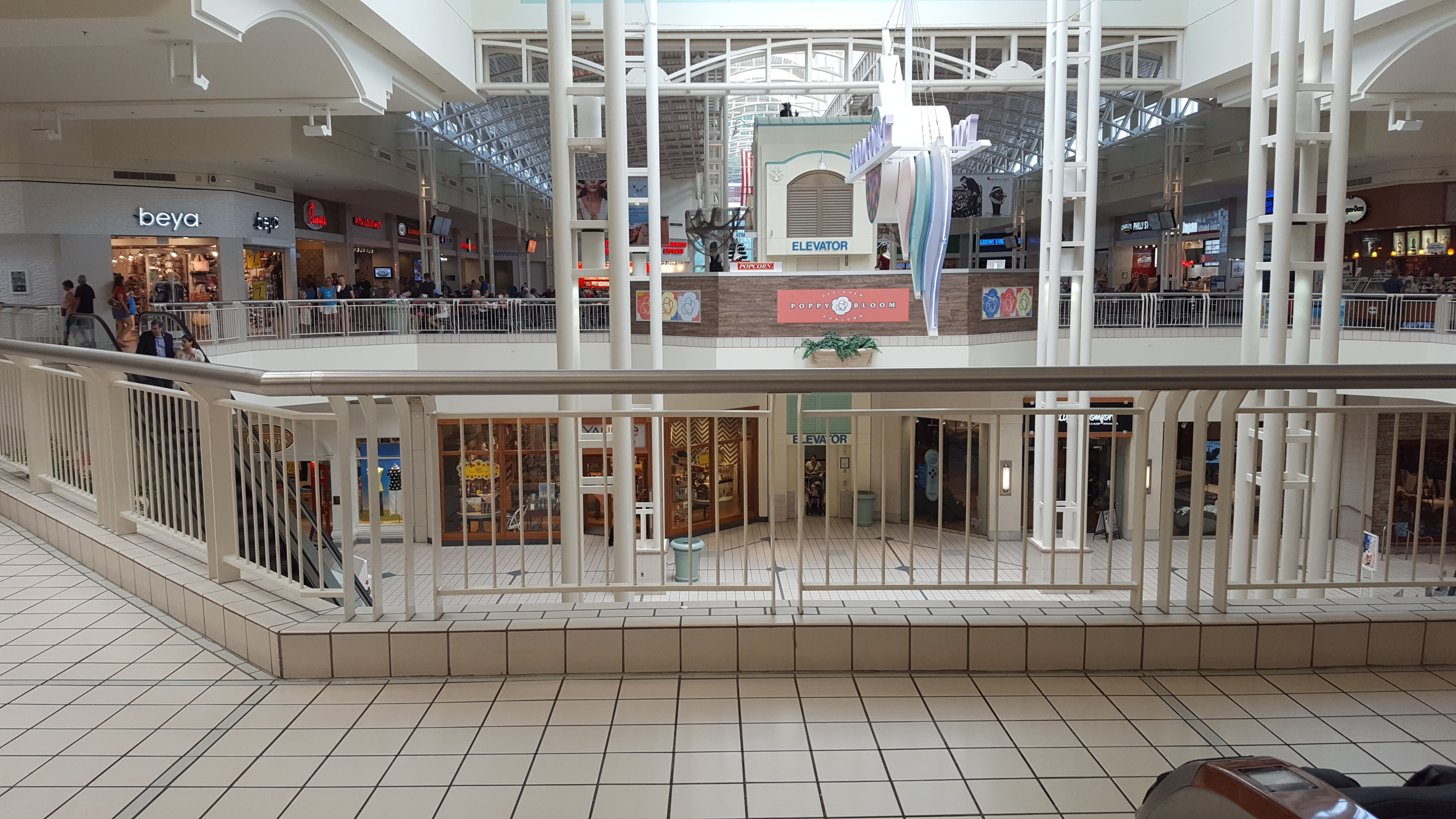
- Atrium and food court in July 2017, taken from 2nd floor
- Location: Sanford, Florida, U.S.
- Address: 200 Towne Center Cir
- Opened: September 22, 1995; 31 years ago
- Closed: January 31, 2025; 21 months ago
- Developer: Simon Property Group
- Manager: The Ardent Companies
- Owner: The Ardent Companies
- Num. of stores: 130 (at peak)
- Num. of anchor tenants: 6 (3 open, 3 vacant)
- Floor area: 1,136,579 square feet (105,591.6 m^{2})
- Floors: 2
- Public transit: Scout micro-transit

Seminole Towne Center was a super-regional enclosed shopping mall in Sanford, Florida. The mall was located at the interchange between Interstate 4, Seminole County Expressway (SR 417), and Wekiva Parkway (SR 429), approximately 20 miles (32 km) north of Orlando.

The 1.14-million-square-foot (106,000 m^{2}) structure opened in 1995 as an upscale mall targeting shoppers from Seminole, Lake, and Volusia counties, but it experienced significant decline during the Great Recession and the COVID-19 pandemic. The mall (with the exception of its four remaining anchor stores) closed at the end of January 2025 and is set to be demolished for a redevelopment project.

== History ==
=== Proposal and opening ===
In the late 1980s, three separate proposals were made for a mall in northern Seminole County near the interchange of Interstate 4 and State Road 46. One of the proposals, made by Melvin Simon & Associates, was for a 1.2-million-square-foot (110,000 m^{2}) structure which would serve as the first phase of a larger development, including a hotel and office complex. In September 1990, Simon announced that Dillard's (which had recently entered the Central Florida area through its purchase of Ivey's) had agreed to serve as an anchor store for the mall, which had been named Seminole Towne Center.

Sanford city government approved $6.3 million in municipal bonds to improve road infrastructure near the proposed site, which would be paid for through a tax increment financing district. Simon also agreed to pay $500,000 to the neighboring city of Lake Mary to widen a road near the site.

Simon initially planned to begin construction of the mall in 1991 with an opening date of summer 1993. However, due to the early 1990s recession, the company was unable to obtain the necessary financing until 1993. The mall's groundbreaking was held on September 9, 1993. The anchor stores JCPenney and Burdines opened on September 1, 1995, and the mall itself would hold its grand opening ceremony three weeks later on the 22nd.

The mall's most notable opening-day tenant was the upscale department store Parisian, which opened its first Central Florida location. Other notable tenants included Aéropostale, Ann Taylor, Brookstone, The Disney Store, Everything But Water, Franklin Quest, The Gap, The Limited, Littman's, and Talbots. Television advertisements for the mall featured the jingle "shop a new mall, mall". An estimated 200,000 people visited the mall on its opening weekend.

=== Early years ===
The mall initially competed with Altamonte Mall, located 10 miles (16 km) south on I-4, as well as Lake Square Mall and Volusia Mall. Another Seminole County-based competitor, Oviedo Marketplace, opened in 1998.

In 1996, a ten-screen United Artists theater opened in an outparcel south of the mall. United Artists also planned to open Starport, a 30,000-square-foot (2,800 m^{2}) virtual reality-focused arcade, in the mall proper, but this never came to fruition.

In 1999, the mall's parking lot hosted the inaugural Seminole County Fair, a carnival midway operated by James E. Strates Shows. The mall would continue to host the fair annually until its closure.

In 2004, Saks, Inc. announced plans to convert its two Orlando-area Parisian locations (namely at Seminole Towne Center and West Oaks Mall) to its midscale McRae's nameplate. This move was in response to four other upscale department stores opening locations in the greater Orlando area. The following year, McRae's was sold to Belk, and Burdines was converted to Macy's as part of a nationwide rebranding initiative. In 2006, the JCPenney was renovated.

=== Great Recession and early troubles ===
In the late 2000s, business at the mall began to slow due to the Great Recession and competition from nearby power centers. In response, the mall announced plans to open more upscale stores, including Buckle, Coach, Coldwater Creek, Hollister, Tillys, and Zumiez, to target shoppers less affected by the recession.

In 2009, Swedish fast fashion retailer H&M announced its first two Florida locations at Seminole Towne Center and fellow Simon property The Florida Mall. The 20,000-square-foot (1,900 m^{2}) store replaced Ann Taylor and Charlotte Russe and opened on October 15.

In 2010, Belk announced the closure of its Seminole Towne Center location in October. The building would remain closed for two years. In February 2012, Dick's Sporting Goods announced plans to open in the top floor of the building; the following June, discount retailer Burlington announced plans to open in the bottom floor. Also in 2012, Sears announced the closure of its clothing department, as well as the bottom floor of its anchor store, which had housed the department. The top floor remained open.

=== Spin-off to Washington Prime ===
On May 28, 2014, Simon Property Group spun off 98 of its smaller properties, including Seminole Towne Center, into Washington Prime Group. At the time of spinoff, the mall had a 90% occupancy rate.

In 2016, 20,000 square feet (1,900 m^{2}) of retail space near Macy's was converted into Athletic Apex, a fitness center.

On May 31, 2018, Sears announced the closure of 63 unprofitable locations nationwide, including its Seminole Towne Center location. The store closed on September 2. Two years later, on January 7, 2020, Macy's announced the closure of its Seminole Towne Center location, leaving the mall with two vacant anchors.

=== Sale to Kohan and 4th Dimension ===
In March 2020, Washington Prime sold the mall for $52.3 million to Seminole Mall Realty Holding, a joint venture between Kohan Retail Investment Group and 4th Dimension Properties. Kohan held a majority stake in the venture and was responsible for daily operations. In April 2020, AdventHealth opened a drive-through COVID-19 testing site at the mall.

In February 2022, the former Sears building was reopened as Elev8 Fun, a family entertainment center offering arcade games, bowling, go-karts, miniature golf, and pool.

In late 2022, Burlington closed and moved to a nearby power center. The following year, the space was temporarily reopened as a Spirit Halloween store.

In June 2023, it was reported that the mall had failed to pay $824,020 of its 2022 property taxes, which could put the property at risk of foreclosure if left unpaid. The Orlando Business Journal reported that Seminole Towne Center was one of five properties owned or co-owned by Kohan to be delinquent on property taxes. In late February 2024, electricity to the mall was disconnected by Florida Power & Light for two days due to delinquent bills. The mall's anchor stores were not affected, as they had separate power connections.

In May 2024, 4th Dimension Properties bought out Kohan's share of the mall for an undisclosed amount and paid off the property's tax debt, which had by that point reached $1.6 million. At the time of sale, the mall had a 79% occupancy rate. 4th Dimension announced plans to repair the mall's air conditioning and escalators, as well as attract new businesses, but the mall continued to decline.

=== Redevelopment plans and closure ===
Shortly after purchasing the mall, Kohan began marketing three parcels of land in the area, including the former Macy's building, for potential redevelopment as multifamily residences. In 2021, developer The Altman Companies announced plans to purchase one of the parcels for a 350-unit apartment community, but it backed out of the sale the following year. In 2023, a similar proposal was made for the former Macy's site by a different developer, Picerne Real Estate Group.

In September 2024, the city of Sanford announced that Gilbane Development had entered into a contract to purchase the mall property for redevelopment. Gilbane would ultimately drop out of the sale, which continued with other investors. On January 8, 2025, it was announced that the mall would close on January 31. The purchase was completed in March, with developer The Ardent Companies acquiring the 76-acre (31 ha) site for $17.5 million.

Plans for the new development include apartments, restaurants (including California Pizza Kitchen), a movie theater, and a Costco store. As of October 2025, Ardent plans to begin demolishing the original mall in mid-2026 and open the first phase of the new development in 2027.

In February 2026, JCPenney announced that it would close in May, having already sold its 9.4-acre (3.8 ha) parcel to Ardent the previous December. The store closed on May 24, 2026.

The mall's three remaining anchor stores–Dillard's, Dick's Sporting Goods, and Elev8 Fun–planned to remain open throughout the redevelopment process, as they were located on separate parcels. Elev8, in particular, announced plans to construct a hotel on its parcel. However, on September 24, 2026, it was announced that Dick's Sporting Goods would be moving to the same power center nearby as Burlington.
