= R. W. Estes Celery Company Precooler Historic District =

Historic district in Florida, United States

- R.W. Estes Celery Company Precooler Historic District
- U.S. National Register of Historic Places
- U.S. Historic district
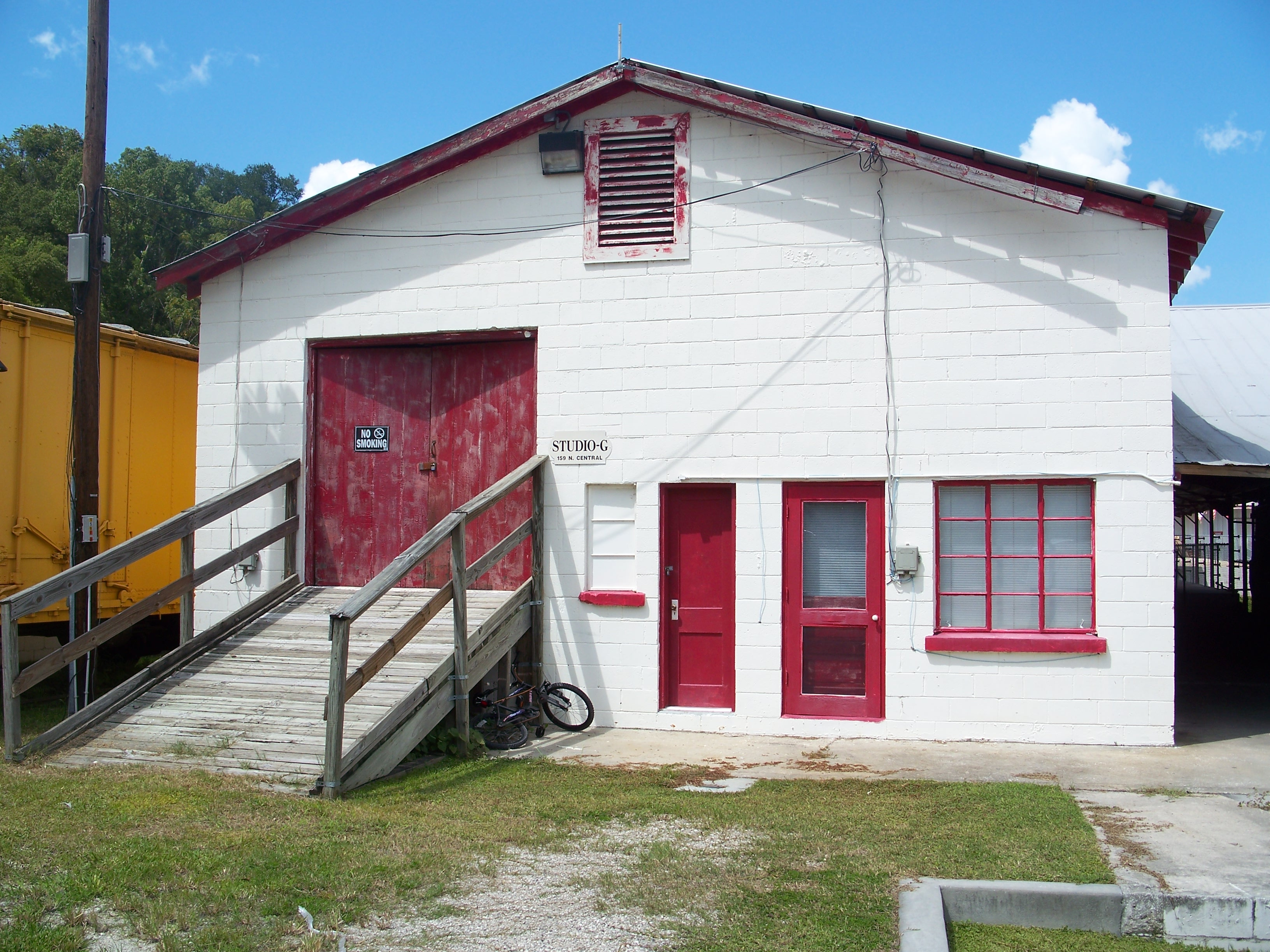

- Location within Florida Location within the United States
- Location: Oviedo, Florida
- Coordinates: 28°40′18″N 81°12′33″W
- Area: 63 acres (250,000 m^{2})
- NRHP reference No.: 01001022
- Added to NRHP: September 20, 2001

The R.W. Estes Celery Company Precooler Historic District (also known as the Nelson & Company Precooler Historic District) is a U.S. historic district (designated as such on September 20, 2001) located in Oviedo, Florida. The district is at 159 North Central Avenue. It contains 3 buildings and 2 structures.
