= First Methodist Church of Oviedo =

- U.S. National Register of Historic Places
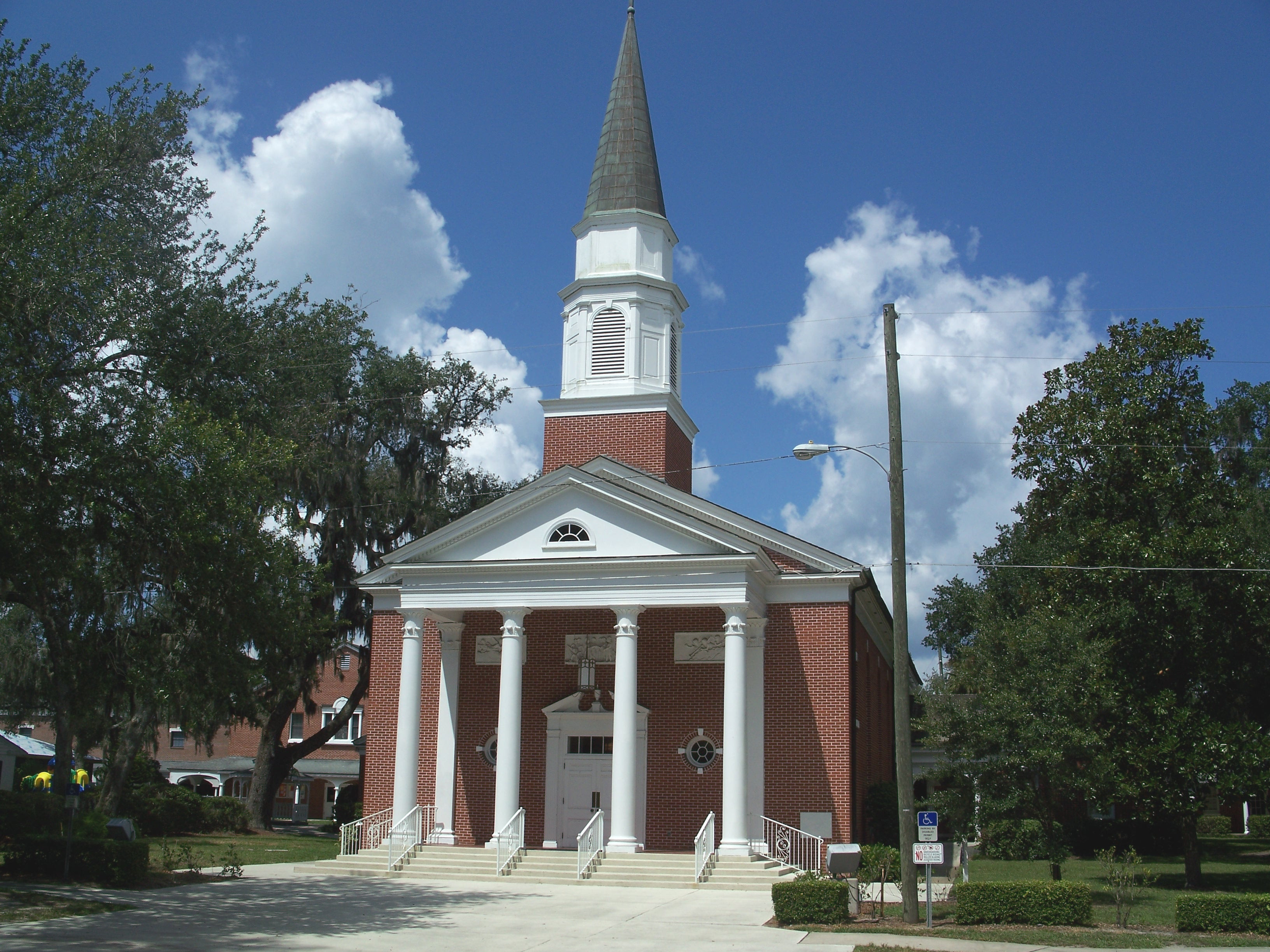
- Location: Oviedo, Florida
- Coordinates: 28°40′20″N 81°12′48″W
- NRHP reference No.: 07000743
- Added to NRHP: July 18, 2007

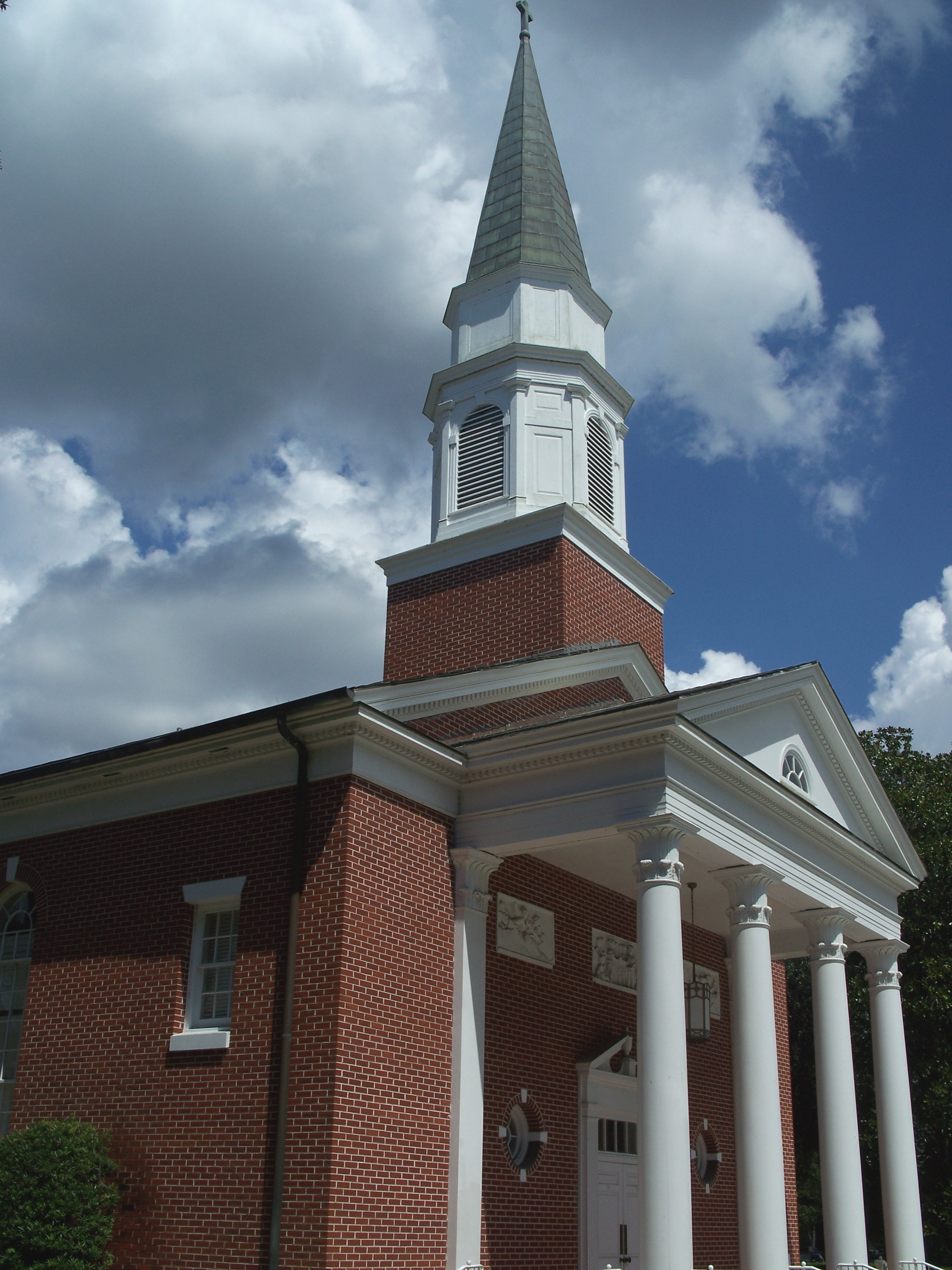
Another view of the church

The First Methodist Church of Oviedo, is a historic church in Oviedo, Florida, United States. It is located at 263 King Street. On July 18, 2007, it was added to the U.S. National Register of Historic Places.

From First Methodist Church of Oviedo "The First Methodist Church of Oviedo is a large, multi-generational church located in the heart of Oviedo. Our mission is to make disciples for Jesus Christ for the transformation of the world as we seek to fulfill our vision of every person becoming a follower of Jesus, loving God and others. We are very active missional based church, both in our own community and throughout the world, and would love for you to be a part of anything we do!"
