= Nelson and Company Historic District =

Historic district in Florida, United States

- U.S. National Register of Historic Places
- U.S. Historic district
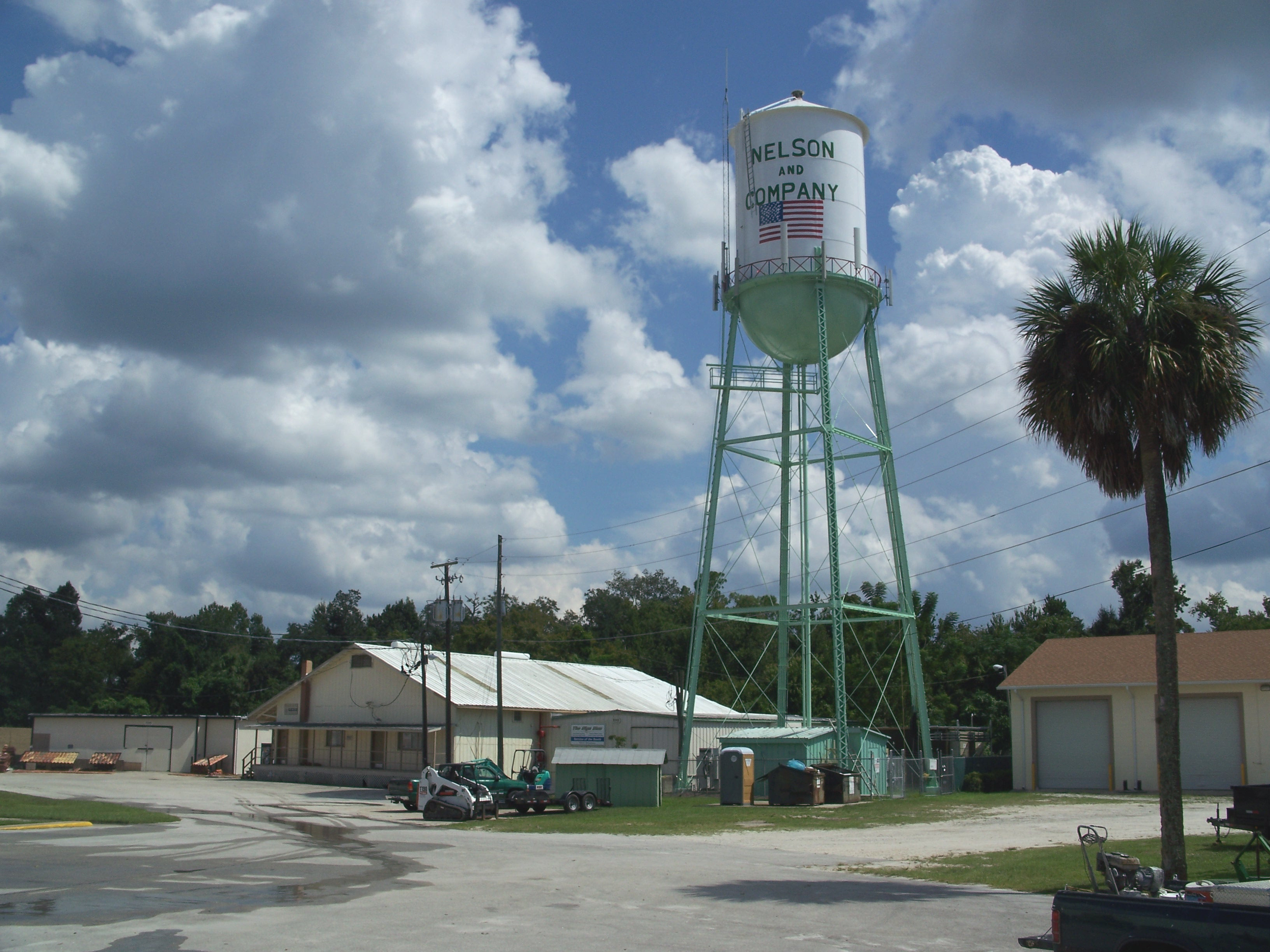

- Location within Florida Location within the United States
- Location: Oviedo, Florida
- Coordinates: 28°40′5″N 81°32′53″W
- Area: 80 acres (320,000 m^{2})
- NRHP reference No.: 01001010
- Added to NRHP: September 20, 2001

The Nelson and Company Historic District is a U.S. historic district (designated as such on September 20, 2001) located in Oviedo, Florida. The district runs from 110 through 166 East Broadway Street and 30 through 110 Station Street. It contains 4 historic buildings.

== Gallery ==
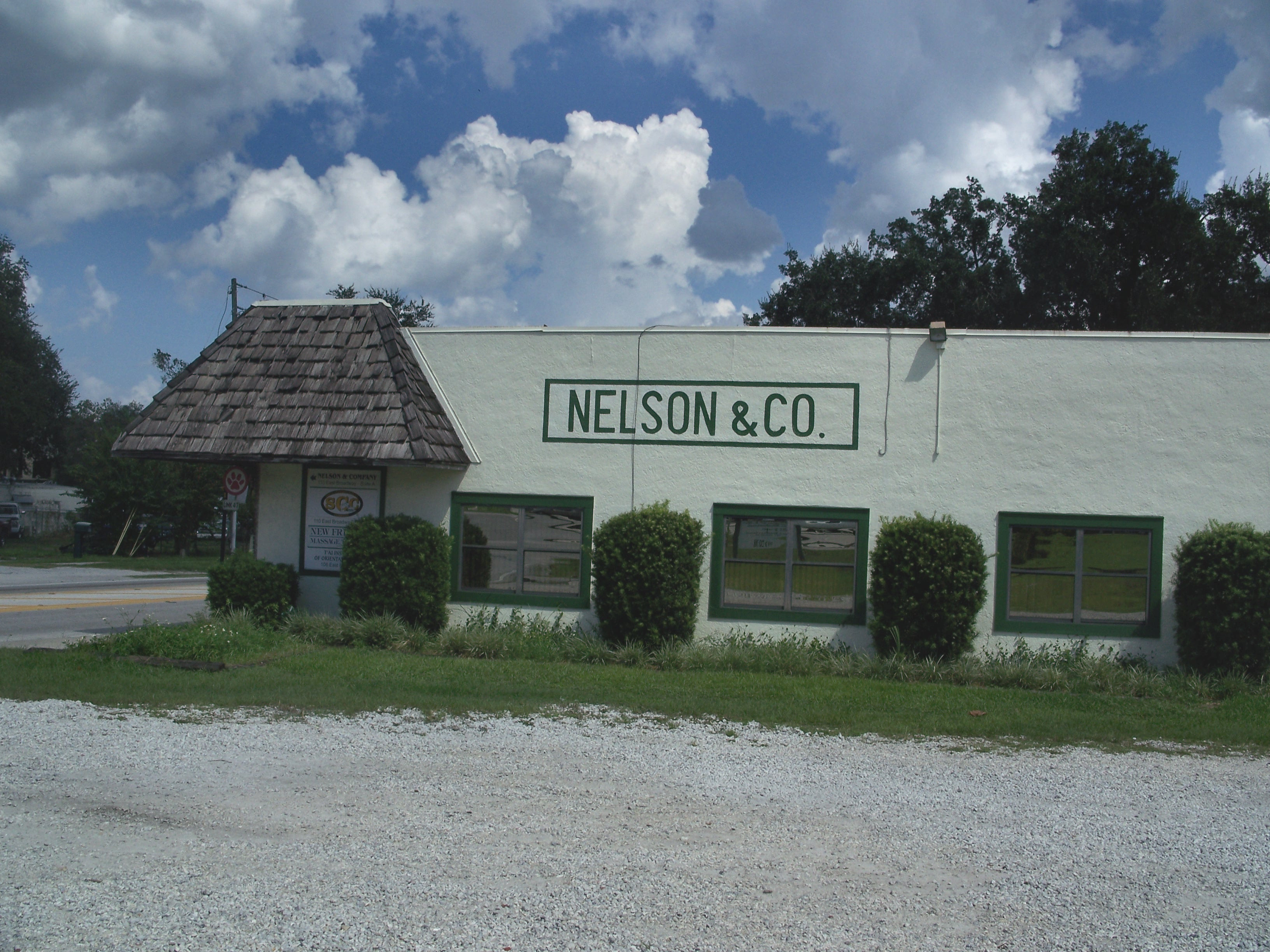

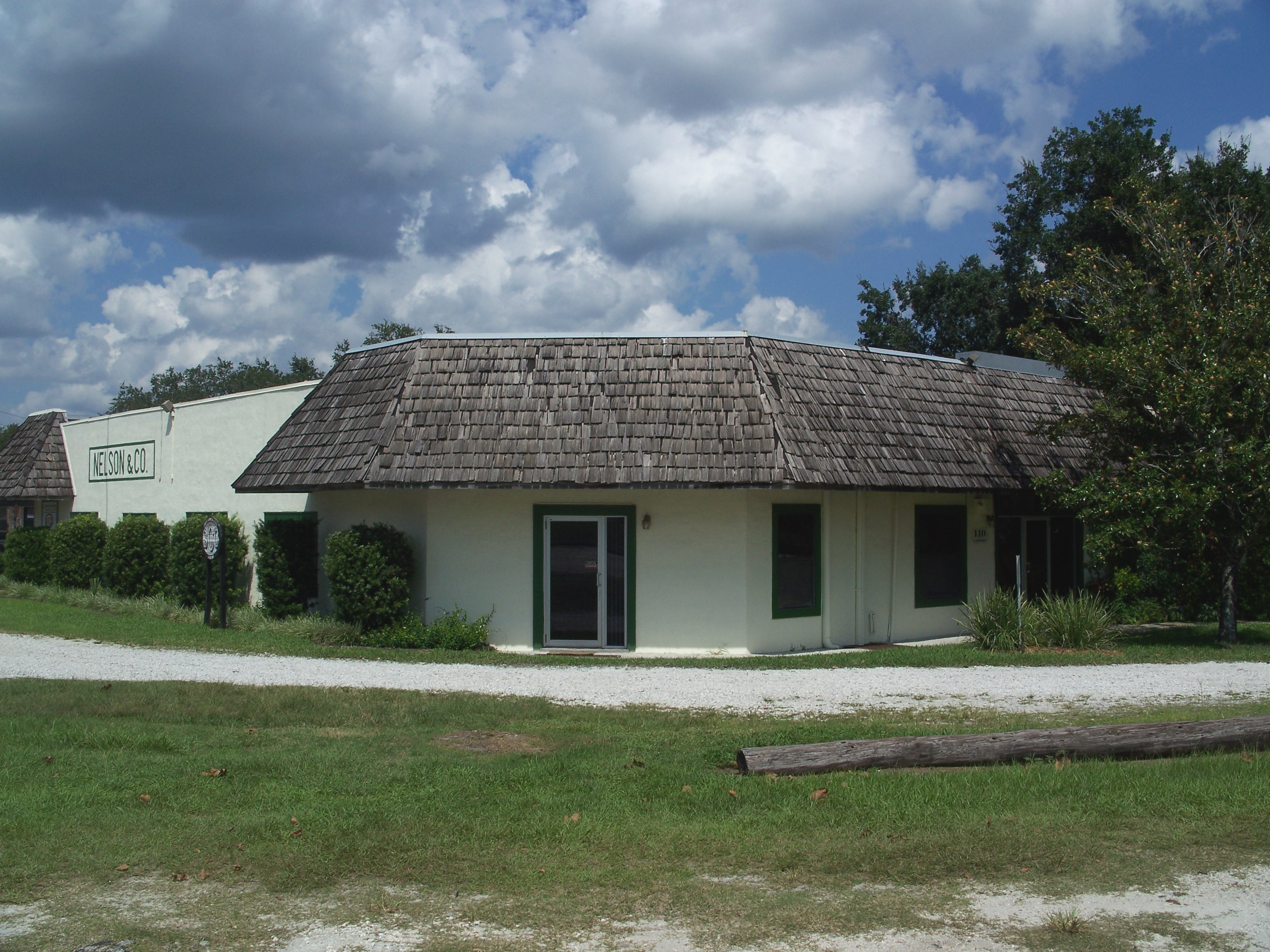
