= Oviedo, Florida =

- City
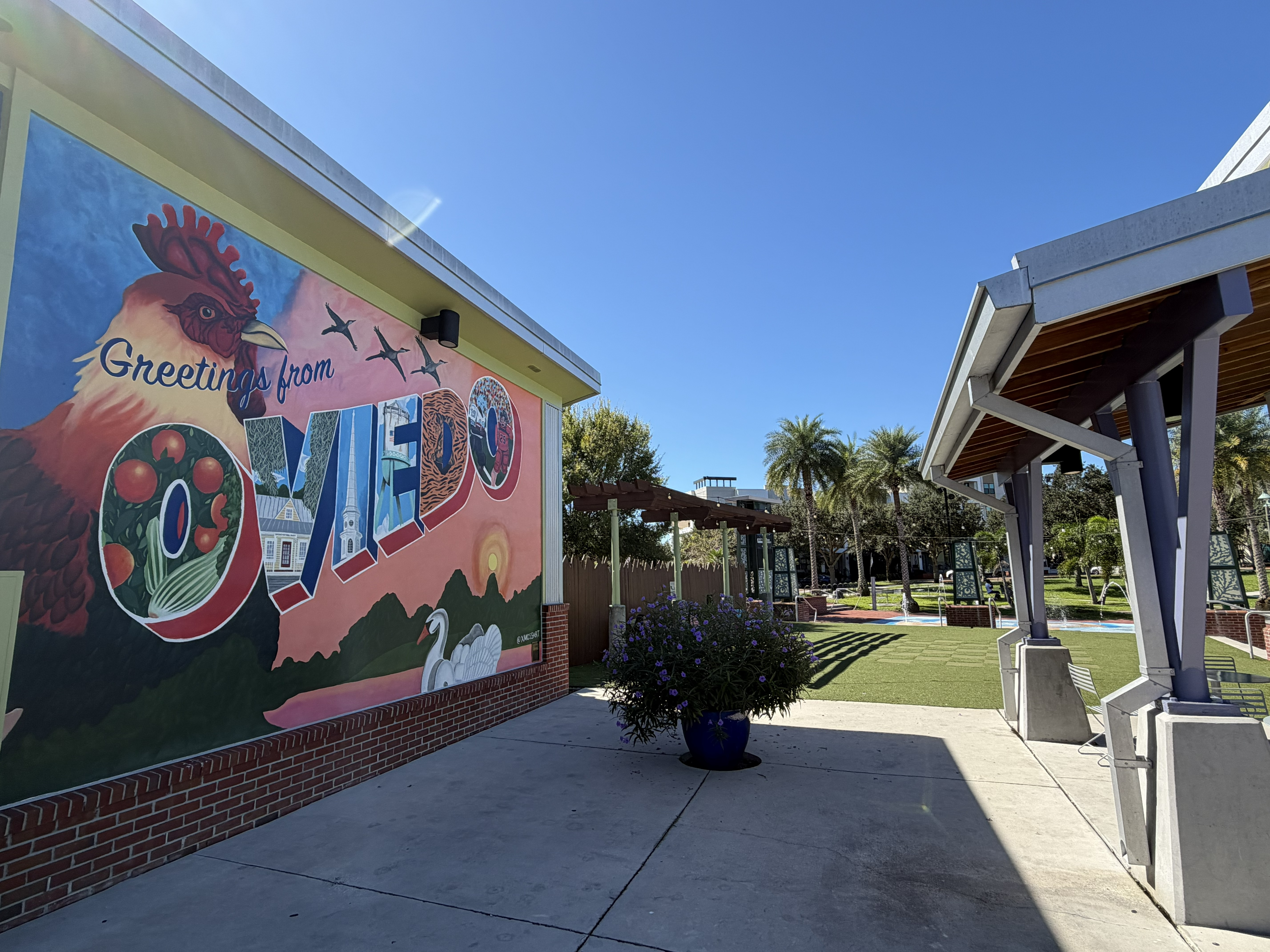
- Oviedo On The Park

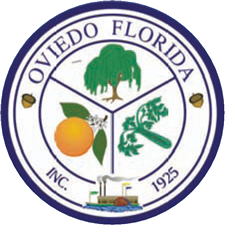
- Seal
- Motto: "Growing in the right direction"
- Location in Seminole County and the state of Florida
- Coordinates: 28°39′29″N 81°11′14″W
- Country: United States
- State: Florida
- County: Seminole
- Settled (Lake Jesup and Powell Settlements): Early 1800s-1875
- Incorporated (Town of Oviedo): 1925
- Incorporated (City of Oviedo): 1967

Government
  - Type: Council-Manager

Area
  - Total: 15.80 sq mi (40.92 km^{2})
  - Land: 15.52 sq mi (40.20 km^{2})
  - Water: 0.28 sq mi (0.72 km^{2})
- Elevation: 46 ft (14 m)

Population (2020)
  - Total: 40,059
  - Density: 2,580.7/sq mi (996.43/km^{2})
- Time zone: UTC-5 (EST)
  - Summer (DST): UTC-4 (EDT)
- ZIP codes: 32762, 32765, 32766
- Area codes: 407, 689, 321
- FIPS code: 12-53575
- GNIS feature ID: 2404447
- Website: City of Oviedo, Florida Website

Oviedo (/ˌoʊˈviːdoʊ/ oh-VEE-doh) is a city in Seminole County, Florida, United States. As of 2020, the population was 40,059. It is part of the Orlando–Kissimmee–Sanford Metropolitan Statistical Area. Oviedo was known for its historic houses and buildings and agriculture, as well as its population of chickens that roamed the downtown area. Although the city historically has been rural, in recent years it has had an influx of new developments to support its rapid growth, due to its proximity to the University of Central Florida and the Central Florida Research Park.

== History ==
Up through the early 19th century, the area encompassing Oviedo was sparsely populated save for a few Seminoles and African-American freemen who associated with the Seminole tribe, known as Black Seminoles, in what was then Spanish Florida. The Seminole tribe had larger clusters of population in other areas of Central Florida, such as nearby Lake Jesup.

The population remained sparse until after the American Civil War, when people devastated by war started moving South to begin a new life. One mile southeast of Lake Jesup, a small group of settlers established the "Lake Jesup Settlement", in 1875. Letters from that era showcased a difficult life for the Florida Cracker settlers: cooking outdoors with wood stoves, sleeping under mosquito nets, and burning rags to keep the insects away. Wildlife was plentiful, however. Initially, this settlement had around 40 families, but quickly evolved into a thriving trading post.

In the late 1870s, individuals living a few miles south of Lake Jesup needed an easily accessible post office in the Florida back country. Andrew Aulin, an early settler and shop-owner, decided to file paperwork for a post office, and in his first site location report, needed a name that was different from any other post office in Florida. Aulin liked having a Spanish name, "to honor the Spanish heritage of the state," and decided to name his post office location "Oviedo" after the city of Oviedo in northern Spain (the capital city of the Principality of Asturias) and the University of Oviedo. Some say he visited the university, while others say he just liked the sound of it, but most agree that he likely pronounced the name oh-vee-AY-doh rather than the anglicized oh-VEE-doh. A recent campaign advocates for honoring Aulin's original concept for the town's moniker by using the Spanish pronunciation oh-vee-AY-doh).

Several people played a prominent role in establishing Oviedo's history. George Powell was an early settler who ran a large tract of land, referred to as the "Powell Settlement", which today encompasses most of the northern part of the city—including the downtown area. One of Powell's sons, Lewis Powell (alias Lewis Payne), became infamous for being John Wilkes Booth's primary accomplice in the plot to assassinate President Abraham Lincoln.

George Powell's friend, Henry Foster, was instrumental in transforming Oviedo's citrus and celery industry from obscurity to prominence by giving Oviedo reliable transportation to deliver its goods. He paid for a railway link to Oviedo and founded the Lake Jesup Steamboat Company. Agriculture was Oviedo's primary industry all the way through the 1940s. In the 1860s, Foster also was responsible for establishing the nearby Lake Charm area as a resort to entice visitors from the North to vacation in the winter; it lasted as a resort only until the 1890s, but several winter homes built during that era still stand today. Foster encouraged settlers to begin attending regular church services on a site within the "Powell Settlement" that would become the First Methodist Church of Oviedo.

A citrus grower named Butler Boston also is credited for helping establish Oviedo's citrus economy by successfully grafting tangerine budwood to grow tangerines, as well as budding the succulent temple orange from Jamaica to several Oviedo fields. Butler Boston was the son of a doctor, Alexander Atkinson, who had fathered Butler, along with several others with freed black women on his family's plantation. Atkinson moved to Oviedo in 1871, with the 12-year-old Butler, both to set up a medical practice and buy a farm. Atkinson gave the land to his son after a freeze when he moved back to Georgia. Boston was so successful that he was hired to bud other Oviedo fields. He became a spokesman for the large black community in the area, and was especially devoted to improving their educational opportunities, and served as a local school trustee. He was also an accomplished bricklayer and oversaw the planning and construction of a new building for the Antioch Baptist Church. His legacy is noted today throughout Oviedo, in sites such as Boston Street, Boston Alley, Boston Cemetery, Boston Hill and Butler Boston Court. His home site is where Canterbury Retreat and Conference Center is located. Its centerpiece is Lake Gem, named by the Boston family for a close family member.

Andrew Duda Sr., a Slovak immigrant, established a farm in nearby Slavia in the early 20th century. He left after failing to produce successful crops, but saved up money and returned in 1926 to try again. The second time, he was extraordinarily successful and his farm survived even through the Great Depression. In fact, in 1939, he was able to build St. Luke's Lutheran Church, which has since expanded into a large Lutheran community. The Duda family started a sod division in the 1970s, that has since flourished and continues today. The west entrance of Oviedo cuts straight through the sod farm.

Oviedo experienced a major growth spurt during the boom years of the 1920s, and new buildings and banks were built on the main street of downtown, named "Broadway". Some of these buildings still remain, along with the complex of buildings surrounding the Nelson and Co. packing house, which was the center of Oviedo's agricultural industry for decades. This agricultural complex eventually shut down for good during the 1980s, after a series of winter freezes. At that time, commercial development had already replaced agriculture as Oviedo's main industry.

Oviedo made the transition from a rural settlement, to officially incorporating into a town in 1925, and then, officially becoming a city in 1967, through a special referendum. Five miles south of Oviedo, in 1963, residents learned about the impending building of a "space university" in the Orlando Morning Sentinel. Many faculty and staff members of Florida Technological University (now the University of Central Florida) moved into Oviedo, and new businesses and industry soon followed. The adjacent Central Florida Research Park, originally established in 1978, has since become the largest research park in Florida. This has resulted in an exploding population with many new developments in recent years. As the city has grown, neither feral hogs nor chickens can be seen wandering among the traffic and buildings in the town any more, leading to the destruction of the small town that originally made Oviedo so charming.

== Geography ==
According to the United States Census Bureau, the city has a total area of 40.0 km^{2} (15.4 mi^{2}). 15.1 square miles (39 km^{2}) of it is land and 0.3 square miles (0.78 km^{2}) of it (2.07%) is water. Oviedo is located about 20 minutes from downtown Orlando, Florida, by highway (SR 417 and SR 408). The Econlockhatchee River runs through the east part of the city, and a tributary, the Little Econlockhatchee River, runs through the southern part of the city.

=== Climate ===
The climate in this area is characterized by hot, humid summers and generally mild winters. According to the Köppen climate classification, the City of Oviedo has a humid subtropical climate (Cfa).

=== Weather events ===
==== 2004 hurricane season ====
In August 2004, the northwestern side of Hurricane Charley passed directly over Oviedo while still a category 2 storm. More than half the city, as well as much of the surrounding unincorporated areas, had no power for five to seven days. School was not in session county-wide for one full school week. The damages ranged from toppled oaks to destroyed homes. The worst damage was in Palm Valley, a mobile home retirement community less than a mile from UCF. Charley's damage in Oviedo is considered to be the worst in Seminole County history. Barely a month later, hurricanes Frances and Jeanne further battered the area resulting in additional damage and power outages, but they did not reach the level of Charley's fury.

==== Tropical Storm Fay ====
Tropical Storm Fay was stationary over Oviedo for days during 2008 with high winds, heavy rains, and flooded roads.

==== Hurricane Ian ====
Hurricane Ian caused widespread damage across Florida in 2022, and Oviedo was one of the many cities impacted. The city's lakes and the Little Econ River flooded, and entire streets in several neighborhoods were submerged.

== Demographics ==
Historical population
| Census | Pop. | Note | %± |
|---|---|---|---|
| 1930 | 1,042 | | — |
| 1940 | 1,356 | | 30.1% |
| 1950 | 1,601 | | 18.1% |
| 1960 | 1,926 | | 20.3% |
| 1970 | 1,870 | | −2.9% |
| 1980 | 3,074 | | 64.4% |
| 1990 | 11,114 | | 261.5% |
| 2000 | 26,316 | | 136.8% |
| 2010 | 33,342 | | 26.7% |
| 2020 | 40,059 | | 20.1% |
U.S. Decennial Census

=== Racial and ethnic composition ===
Oviedo racial composition (Hispanics excluded from racial categories) (NH = Non-Hispanic)
| Race | Pop 2010 | Pop 2020 | % 2010 | % 2020 |
|---|---|---|---|---|
| White (NH) | 23,178 | 24,174 | 69.52% | 60.35% |
| Black or African American (NH) | 2,695 | 2,886 | 8.08% | 7.20% |
| Native American or Alaska Native (NH) | 52 | 59 | 0.16% | 0.15% |
| Asian (NH) | 1,241 | 2,365 | 3.72% | 5.90% |
| Pacific Islander or Native Hawaiian (NH) | 9 | 15 | 0.03% | 0.04% |
| Some other race (NH) | 120 | 286 | 0.36% | 0.71% |
| Two or more races/Multiracial (NH) | 606 | 1,893 | 1.82% | 4.73% |
| Hispanic or Latino (any race) | 5,441 | 8,381 | 16.32% | 20.92% |
| Total | 33,342 | 40,059 | | |

=== 2020 census ===
As of the 2020 census, Oviedo had a population of 40,059. The median age was 37.6 years. 26.1% of residents were under the age of 18 and 11.3% of residents were 65 years of age or older. For every 100 females there were 94.1 males, and for every 100 females age 18 and over there were 92.0 males age 18 and over.

99.6% of residents lived in urban areas, while 0.4% lived in rural areas.

There were 13,466 households in Oviedo, of which 43.9% had children under the age of 18 living in them. Of all households, 62.2% were married-couple households, 11.6% were households with a male householder and no spouse or partner present, and 20.5% were households with a female householder and no spouse or partner present. About 14.1% of all households were made up of individuals and 5.1% had someone living alone who was 65 years of age or older.

There were 13,860 housing units, of which 2.8% were vacant. The homeowner vacancy rate was 0.8% and the rental vacancy rate was 5.2%.

Racial composition as of the 2020 census
| Race | Number | Percent |
|---|---|---|
| White | 26,305 | 65.7% |
| Black or African American | 3,067 | 7.7% |
| American Indian and Alaska Native | 109 | 0.3% |
| Asian | 2,410 | 6.0% |
| Native Hawaiian and Other Pacific Islander | 18 | 0.0% |
| Some other race | 1,997 | 5.0% |
| Two or more races | 6,153 | 15.4% |
| Hispanic or Latino (of any race) | 8,381 | 20.9% |

=== 2020 ACS estimates ===
According to the 2020 American Community Survey 5-year estimates, there were 10,790 families residing in the city.

=== 2017 estimates ===
As of 2017, the population was spread out, with 25.9% under the age of 18 and 9.8% over the age of 65. The city was 51.4% female. The median income for a household in the city was $84,916, and the per capita income was $32,834. About 7.0% of the population was below the poverty line. Of adults twenty-five years or older, 95.4% graduated from high school, and 43.9% held a bachelor's degree.

=== 2010 census ===
As of the 2010 United States census, there were 33,342 people, 9,908 households, and 8,415 families residing in the city.

In 2010, there were 9,908 households, out of which 46.7% had children under the age of 18 living with them, 63.4% were married couples living together, 12.1% had a female householder with no husband present, 4.8% had a male householder with no wife present, and 3.4% had someone living alone who was 65 years of age or older. The average household size was 2.99 and the average family size was 3.28.

== Arts and culture ==
=== Historic downtown ===
Most of the buildings in the downtown historic area were constructed during the late 19th and early 20th centuries. The Nelson and Company Historic District, the R.W. Estes Celery Company Precooler Historic District, the First Methodist Church of Oviedo, and several houses in Oviedo are listed in the National Register of Historic Places. The nearby Oviedo Mall featured murals of historic areas along with pictures of early European and African-American settlers in the area until renovations in 2022.

State Road 434, which cuts through downtown Oviedo, is currently being widened and several buildings have been demolished. The Oviedo Preservation Project has been tasked with photographing and documenting the buildings for posterity.

An African-American Oviedo pioneer named Mathew Powell established the Antioch Missionary Baptist Church in April 1875.

=== New developments ===
In 2015, the city of Oviedo dedicated a brand new downtown development just south of the current "old downtown" along Oviedo Boulevard. The new town center, named "Oviedo on the Park", is a mixed use development with townhouses, apartment homes, restaurants, and retail. It is centered around the new Center Lake Park with a man-made lake, large amphitheater, playground and veterans tribute.

The Oviedo Mall is a single-story indoor mall with a movie theater built in 1998.

=== Library ===
The East Branch of the Seminole County Public Library System is located in Oviedo on Division Street. The library is open 7 days a week except for certain holidays. This location provides curbside pick-up, 3D printing, free access to the Internet, meeting rooms available for reservation, and children, teen, and adult programs.

== Parks and recreation ==
Oviedo's Gym and Aquatic Center features a waterslide, water park, and pool. Riverside Park contains a pool, tennis courts and skate park.

Black Hammock Adventures is a complex that offers airboat rides and a display of live gators. Lukas Butterfly Encounter is also located in Oviedo. The Pinball Lounge, located in the Oviedo Bowling Center, has the largest concentration of pinball machines in the state.

== Media ==
The Seminole Voice and The Seminole Chronicle (publication ceased in July 2014) are both print newspapers that cover Seminole County news, with a focus on the Winter Springs, Oviedo, and Chuluota areas of the county. The Oviedo Voice has covered Oviedo since 1993. The Oviedo Citizen is an online publication that has been covering Oviedo news since August 2008.

== Infrastructure ==
Oviedo Medical Center, a 64-bed hospital and emergency room, opened in 2017.

== Twin towns – sister cities ==
Oviedo is twinned with:

- Oviedo, Spain, since 1877

== Notable people ==
- Mark Bellhorn, professional MLB baseball player
- Denée Benton, Broadway actress and singer
- Blake Bortles, retired NFL quarterback
- Ryan Carpenter, professional NHL hockey player for the New York Rangers
- Kayli Carter, actress
- Alwyn Cashe, US Army, posthumously awarded the Silver Star and Medal of Honor for valor in Iraq
- Talia Joy Castellano, thirteen-year-old internet celebrity, died from neuroblastoma and preleukemia
- Jeff Driskel, professional NFL quarterback for the Houston Texans
- Zach Eflin, professional MLB baseball player for the Tampa Bay Rays
- Randy Fontanez, professional MLB baseball player
- Stuart Fullerton, entomologist, founder of the "Bug Closet" at the University of Central Florida
- Riley Greene, MLB professional baseball player
- Hal King, professional MLB baseball player
- Robert T. Kuhn, past president of the Lutheran Church–Missouri Synod
- Chaunte Lowe, Olympic medalist high jumper
- Theodore Mead, horticulturalist and naturalist
- Tomas Nido, MLB catcher for the Chicago Cubs
- Peter Pritchard, zoologist and founder of the Chelonian Research Institute
- Tommy Redding, professional soccer player
- Tom Rhodes, comedian and actor
- Jenny Simpson, professional runner and Olympic medalist, current American record holder in steeplechase
- Kayla Sims, YouTuber, The Sims streamer
- Monty Sopp, professional wrestler under the ring names "Billy Gunn" and "The Outlaw"
- Shin-Tson Wu, optical physicist, inventor, and pioneer of liquid crystal displays
