= Old Fernald-Laughton Memorial Hospital =

- U.S. National Register of Historic Places
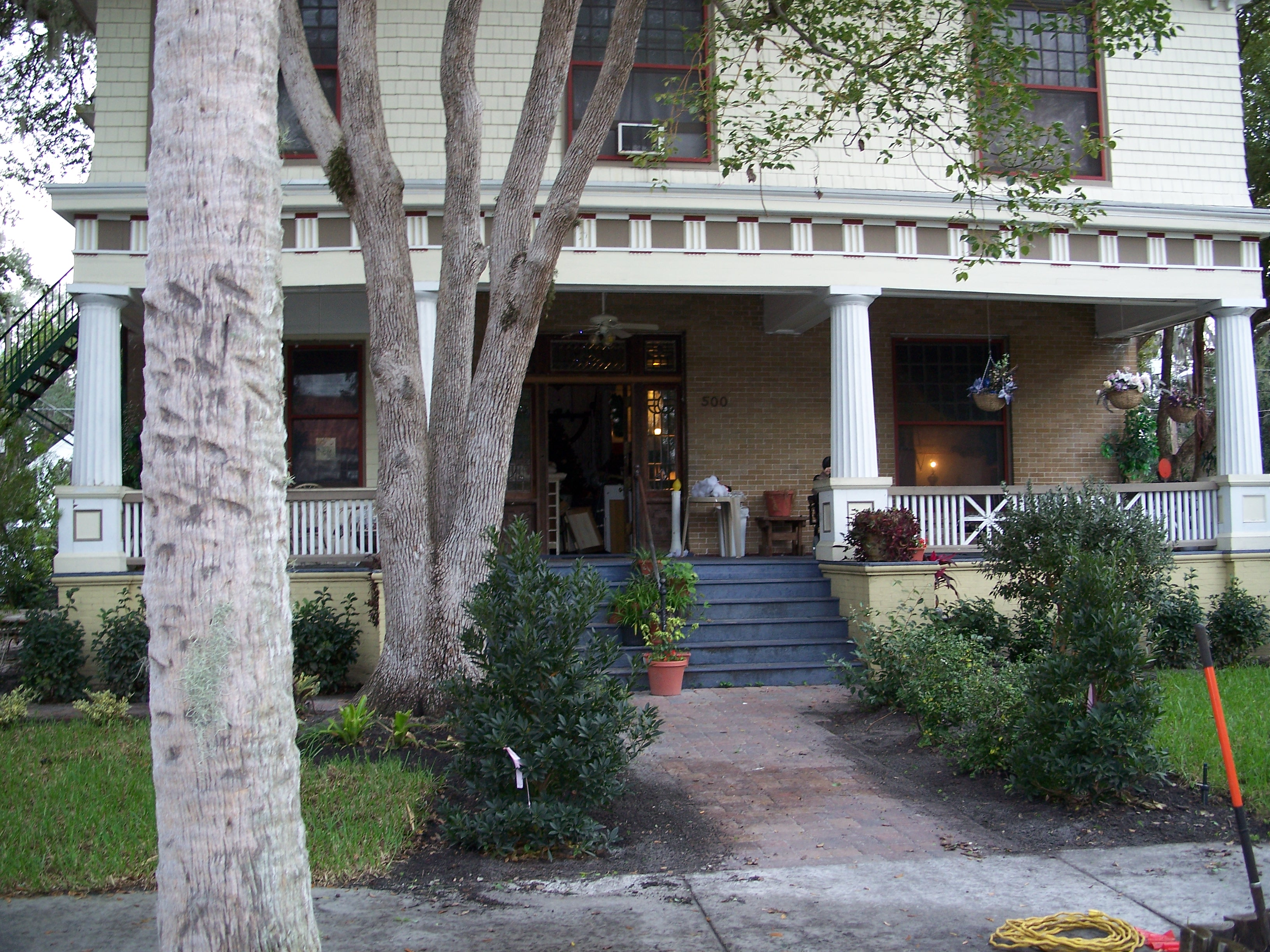

- Location within Florida Location within the United States
- Location: Sanford, Florida
- Coordinates: 28°48′27″N 81°16′10″W
- Built: 1910
- Architectural style: Colonial Revival
- NRHP reference No.: 87000805
- Added to NRHP: May 21, 1987

The Old Fernald-Laughton Memorial Hospital (also known as the Florida Hotel or George Fernald House) is a historic site in Sanford, Florida, United States. It is located at 500 South Oak Avenue. On May 21, 1987, it was added to the U.S. National Register of Historic Places.

== Gallery ==
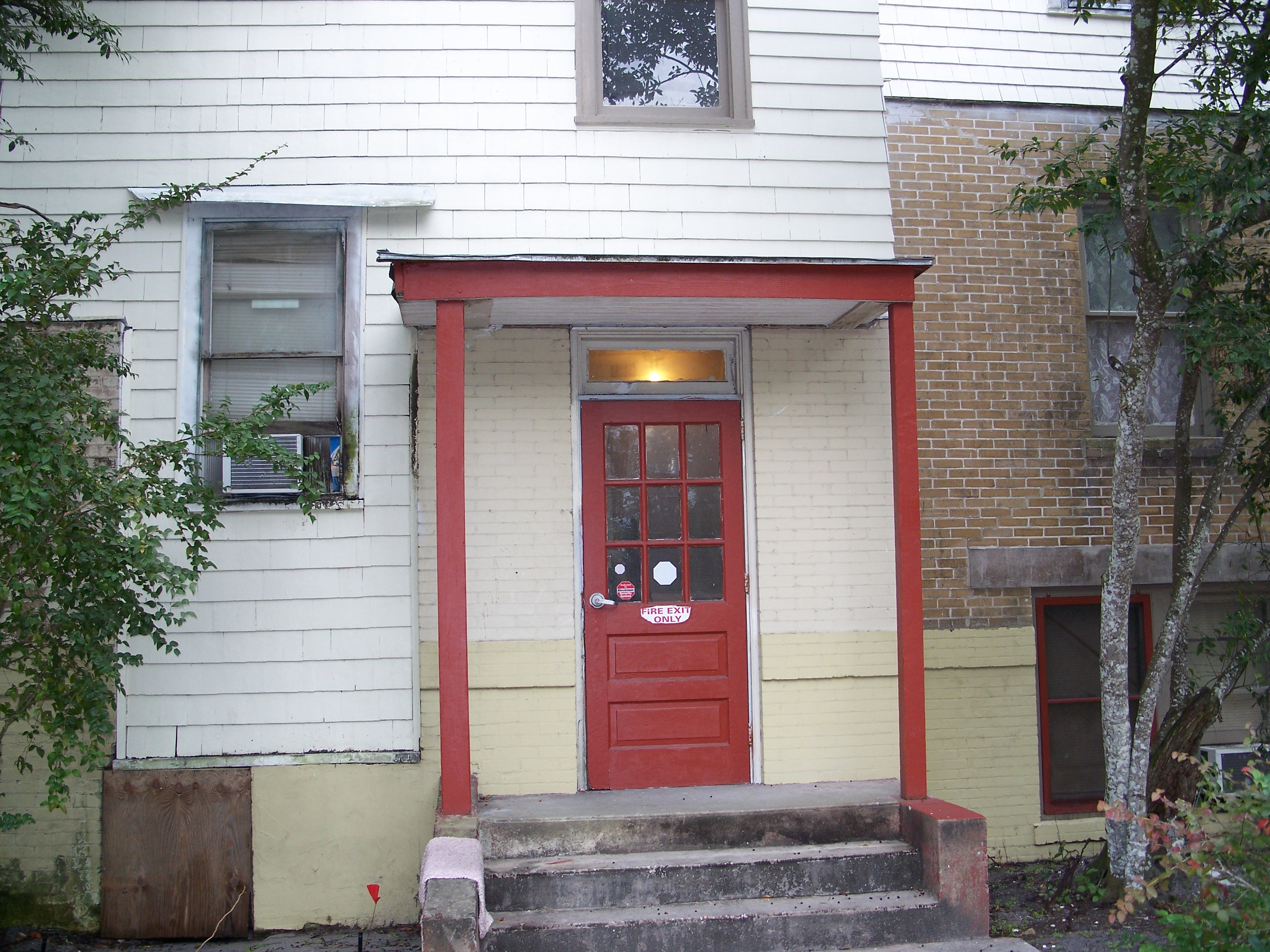
Side entrance

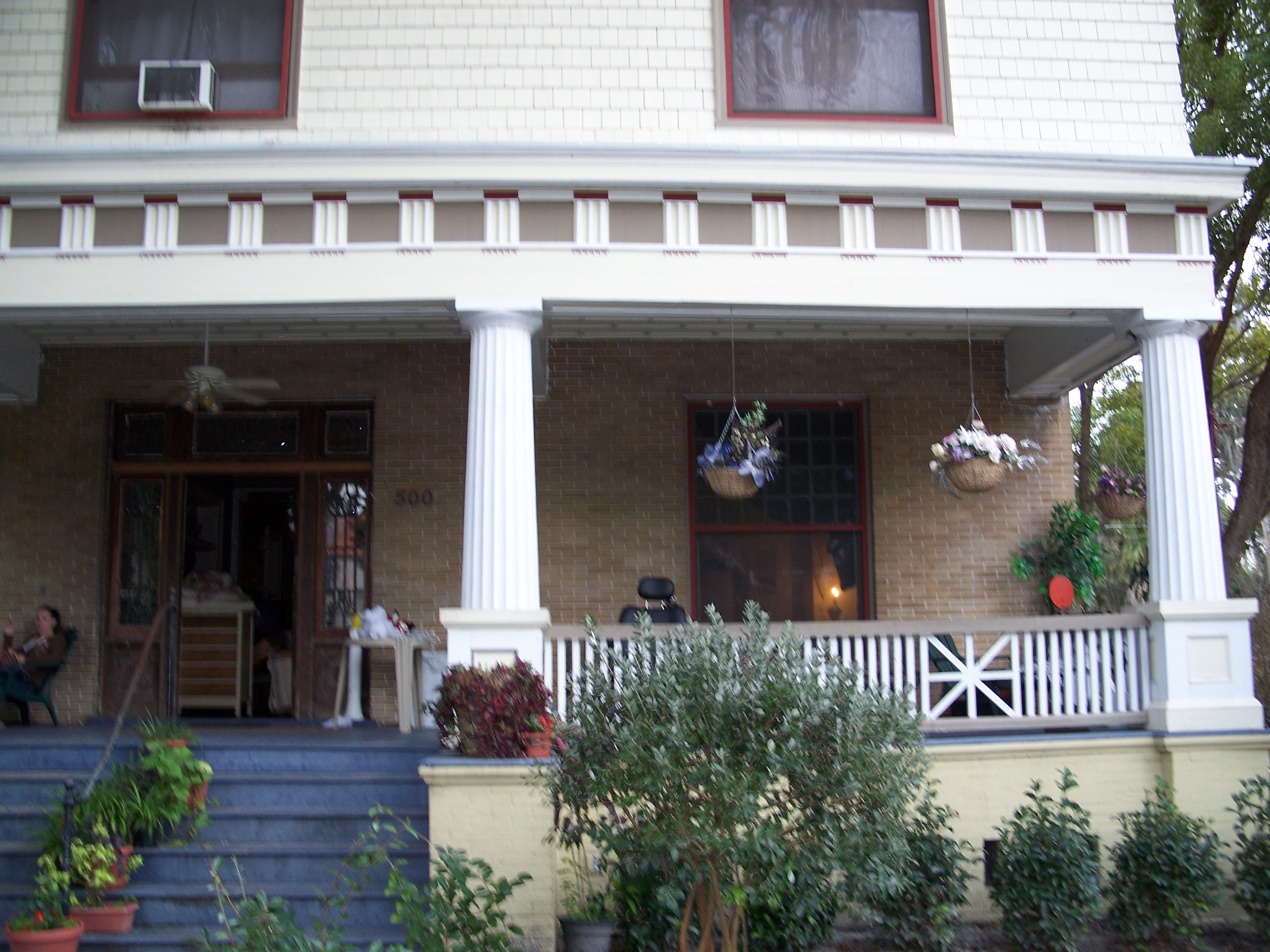
