= Hispanics and Latinos in Massachusetts =

The Commonwealth of Massachusetts is home to a large number of Hispanic and Latino residents. As of the 2020 Census, Hispanics and Latinos accounted for 12% of the total state's population (that is; 627,654 residents of Hispanic or Latino ethnic origin)

As of 2025, estimates 18.6% of the total states population is of Hispanic or Latino ethnic origin (1,335,876).

Starting in the 1960s, there was large influx of Hispanic immigrants to the state of Massachusetts mainly because of the economic opportunities the state has to offer. The Latino population in the state of Massachusetts continues to grow at a rapid rate.

== Statistics ==
- Massachusetts is one of six states in the country that can attribute nearly all of its growth from 2000 to 2010 to the Hispanic population.
- 69% of Massachusetts' Hispanic population is native-born. This can be attributed to the large Puerto Rican population.
- The largest population of Puerto Ricans in the United States, per capita, is in Holyoke, Massachusetts, comprising 44.8% of all residents in the 2010 Census.
- Massachusetts ranks first in the nation (out of 50 U.S. states and Washington, D.C.) for percentage of Hispanics of non-Mexican origin, with 94% of the Hispanic population being of non-Mexican origin.
- The median age for all Hispanics is 26; significantly lower than for non-Hispanic Whites (median age: 43). For native-born Hispanics, the median age is 20; for foreign-born Hispanics, the median age is 38.
- 33% of all Hispanic persons that were 15 years and older were married (26% for native-born Hispanics; 43% for foreign-born Hispanics); compared to 49% for non-Hispanic Whites and 33% for non-Hispanic Blacks.
- 41% of Hispanic youths were in poverty, compared to 8% for non-Hispanic White youths and 26% for non-Hispanic Black youths.
- 25% of Hispanic adults were in poverty, compared to 8% for non-Hispanic White adults and 19% for non-Hispanic Black adults.
- 10% of all Hispanics in Massachusetts are uninsured (6% for native-born Hispanics; 17% for foreign-born Hispanics); compared to 3% for non-Hispanic Whites and 8% for non-Hispanic Blacks.
- There were 149,000 Hispanics enrolled in K-12, accounting for 15% of all K-12 students.
- 22% of Hispanic persons age 5 and older spoke only English at home, while 78% of Hispanic persons age 5 and older spoke a language other than English at home.
- According to a 2019 projection conducted by Gaston Institute, by 2025, the Latino population in the state of Massachusetts will grow to over 1.15 million and will represent roughly 15.3 percent of the population. This projection also concludes that the Latinos already living in the state of Massachusetts will have more of an impact on the future population than will future immigrants.
- According to a 2019 Census provided by the Migration Policy Institute, there are estimated to be around 209,000 unauthorized immigrants in the state of Massachusetts. Of that 209,000, 20 percent of those unauthorized immigrants are born in Brazil. However, only 12 percent of that 209,000 live below the poverty line.

Historical population
Census	Pop.	Note	%±
1980	141,043		—
1990	287,549		103.9%
2000	428,729		49.1%
2010	627,654		46.4%
2016 (est.)	731,739		16.6%

== Hispanic or Latino by specific origin ==
Hispanic or Latino by specific origin	Estimate	%
Total population	7,044,056	100.0%
Hispanic or Latino (of any race)	1,037,209	14.7%
(Mexico) Mexican	55,586	0.8%
(Puerto Rico) Puerto Rican	326,360	4.6%
(Cuba) Cuban	15,844	0.2%
(Dominican Republic) Dominican	191,914	2.7%
Central American	171,265	2.4%
(Costa Rica) Costa Rican	5,957	0.1%
(Guatemala) Guatemalan	58,416	0.8%
(Honduras) Honduran	20,561	0.3%
(Nicaragua) Nicaraguan	3,620	0.1%
(Panama) Panamanian	3,057	0.0%
(El Salvador) Salvadoran	77,108	1.1%
Other Central American	2,546	0.0%
South American	208,335	3.0%
(Argentina) Argentine	5,298	0.1%
(Brazil) Brazilian	100,356	1.4%
(Bolivia) Bolivian	1,938	0.0%
(Chile) Chilean	4,533	0.1%
(Colombia) Colombian	45,619	0.6%
(Ecuador) Ecuadorian	23,109	0.3%
(Paraguay) Paraguayan	705	0.0%
(Peru) Peruvian	12,477	0.2%
(Uruguay) Uruguayan	3,010	0.0%
(Venezuela) Venezuelan	9,398	0.1%
Other South American	1,892	0.0%
Other Hispanic or Latino	67,905	1.0%
(Spain) Spaniard/Spanish	26,908	0.4%
All other Hispanic or Latino	40,997	0.6%

== Counties by origin ==
Massachusetts Counties by Hispanic & Latino origin. All but 2 Massachusetts counties are of majority Puerto Rican ancestry, Essex & Suffolk are majority Dominican ancestry. Mexican, Salvadoran, and Brazilian come at #2 for majority of the counties.

== Hispanic and Latino communities ==
The 20 largest Hispanic and Latino communities in Massachusetts are as follow:

City	Total	Percent	Largest pop.	Number	Percent	2nd largest pop.	Number	Percent	3rd largest pop.	Number	Percent
Boston	131,170	19.7%	(Dominican Republic) Dominican	40,543	6.1%	(Puerto Rico) Puerto Rican	27,420	4.1%	(El Salvador) Salvadoran	11,540	1.7%
Springfield	75,207	48.6%	(Puerto Rico) Puerto Rican	59,920	38.7%	(Dominican Republic) Dominican	6,139	4.0%	(Guatemala) Guatemalan	2,195	1.4%
Lawrence	74,405	83.8%	(Dominican Republic) Dominican	46,383	52.3%	(Puerto Rico) Puerto Rican	15,139	17.1%	(Guatemala) Guatemalan	3,943	4.4%
Worcester	57,752	27.9%	(Puerto Rico) Puerto Rican	26,873	13.0%	(Dominican Republic) Dominican	9,439	4.6%	(Brazil) Brazilian	5,459	2.6%
Lynn	47,511	46.7%	(Dominican Republic) Dominican	15,992	15.7%	(Guatemala) Guatemalan	9,931	9.8%	(El Salvador) Salvadoran	7,633	7.5%
Chelsea	27,447	68.8%	(El Salvador) Salvadoran	9,405	23.6%	(Honduras) Honduran	3,650	9.1%	(Guatemala) Guatemalan	3,492	8.8%
New Bedford	27,092	26.8%	(Puerto Rico) Puerto Rican	13,571	13.4%	(Guatemala) Guatemalan	3,105	3.1%	(Dominican Republic) Dominican	2,588	2.6%
Lowell	27,005	22.8%	(Puerto Rico) Puerto Rican	12,070	10.2%	(Dominican Republic) Dominican	3,824	3.2%	(Brazil) Brazilian	3,318	2.8%
Revere	26,166	43.6%	(Colombia) Colombian	6,574	11.0%	(El Salvador) Salvadoran	6,255	10.4%	(Brazil) Brazilian	2,586	4.3%
Framingham	23,734	32.8%	(Brazil) Brazilian	10,169	14.0%	(Puerto Rico) Puerto Rican	2,958	4.1%	(El Salvador) Salvadoran	2,519	3.5%
Everett	21,862	43.7%	(El Salvador) Salvadoran	8,166	16.3%	(Brazil) Brazilian	5,584	11.2%	(Puerto Rico) Puerto Rican	1,986	4.0%
Holyoke	19,803	52.4%	(Puerto Rico) Puerto Rican	17,153	45.4%	(Dominican Republic) Dominican	798	2.1%	(Uruguay) Uruguayan	310	0.8%
Haverhill	18,214	26.9%	(Dominican Republic) Dominican	8,111	12.0%	(Puerto Rico) Puerto Rican	5,217	7.7%	(Guatemala) Guatemalan	764	1.1%
Methuen	18,078	33.8%	(Dominican Republic) Dominican	9,646	18.0%	(Puerto Rico) Puerto Rican	3,635	6.8%	(Guatemala) Guatemalan	1,346	2.5%
Fall River	15,666	16.7%	(Puerto Rico) Puerto Rican	6,293	6.7%	(Brazil) Brazilian	2,975	3.2%	(Ecuador) Ecuadorian	1,567	1.7%
Chicopee	14,989	27.1%	(Puerto Rico) Puerto Rican	12,693	23.0%	(Dominican Republic) Dominican	887	1.6%	(Honduras) Honduran	324	0.6%
Fitchburg	14,517	34.7%	(Puerto Rico) Puerto Rican	9,005	21.5%	(Dominican Republic) Dominican	1,113	2.7%	(Uruguay) Uruguayan	992	2.4%
Brockton	14,461	13.7%	(Puerto Rico) Puerto Rican	4,738	4.5%	(Dominican Republic) Dominican	2,102	2.0%	(Ecuador) Ecuadorian	1,608	1.5%
Marlborough	12,574	30.2%	(Brazil) Brazilian	5,097	12.2%	(Guatemala) Guatemalan	2,390	5.7%	(Puerto Rico) Puerto Rican	1,207	2.9%
Cambridge	11,257	9.5%	(Puerto Rico) Puerto Rican	2,322	2.0%	(Mexico) Mexican	1,693	1.4%	(Dominican Republic) Dominican	809	0.7%
