= Stateside Puerto Ricans =

Ethnic group, nationality, and citizens of Puerto Rico in the US

Puertorriqueños en Estados Unidos

Total population
- ▲6,110,356 (1.80% of the US population)

Regions with significant populations
- Majority concentrated in New York, Pennsylvania, New Jersey, Massachusetts, Connecticut, and Florida; Smaller numbers in other parts, including Rhode Island, Delaware, and Maryland in the Northeast, Virginia, North Carolina, Georgia, and Texas in the South, Ohio, Illinois, and Wisconsin in the Midwest, and California and Hawaii in the west.

Languages
- Puerto Rican Spanish, Puerto Rican English, American Spanish, American English, Spanglish

Religion
- Christianity (Catholic Church and Protestant)

Related ethnic groups
- Taíno; Spaniards; Canarians; African; European; West Indians; Dominicans; Cubans; Filipinos; Indians; Chinese; Japanese; Koreans; Indonesians; Native Americans

Stateside Puerto Ricans or Puerto Ricans in the United States (Spanish: Puertorriqueños en Estados Unidos), also known as Puerto Rican Americans (Spanish: puertorriqueños estadounidenses, or puertorriqueños americanos), are Americans in the United States proper, namely the 50 states and Washington, D.C., who were born in or trace any ancestry to the archipelago and island of Puerto Rico, a US unincorporated territory and insular area whose people are US nationals since the Treaty of Paris of 1898 and statutory birthright US citizens since the Jones–Shafroth Act of 1917.

The 2020 US Census counted the number of Puerto Ricans living in the United States proper at 5.6 million. As of 2024, the US Census Bureau estimates the Puerto Rican population to be 6.11 million, making up 1.8% of the US population. After Mexicans, Puerto Ricans are the second largest Hispanic group, representing 9.0% of the US Hispanic population. They are also the largest West Indian group, representing 40.4% of people with origins in the Caribbean.

The Northeast (2.7 million) and Florida (1.3 million) account for 65.4% of the Puerto Rican population in the United States proper. The states with the largest Puerto Rican populations are Florida, New York (995,000), Pennsylvania (494,000), New Jersey (484,000), Massachusetts (330,000), and Connecticut (300,000). Puerto Ricans make up the largest share of the population in Connecticut (8.3%), Florida (5.6%), New Jersey (5.1%), New York (5.0%), Massachusetts (4.7%), and Rhode Island (4.5%). They are the largest Hispanic group in Connecticut (42.7%), Pennsylvania (39.9%), Massachusetts (33.0%), New York (24.9%), New Hampshire (22.8%), and New Jersey (21.7%). They are the second largest Hispanic group in several states, including Ohio (25.3%), Rhode Island (23.4%), and Florida (19.4%), behind Mexicans (41.1%), Dominicans (38.8%), and Cubans (26.8%), respectively.

Greater New York is the metropolitan area with the largest Puerto Rican population, with New York City being the largest demographic, cultural, and historical center for Puerto Ricans in the United States proper. The portmanteau "Nuyorican" refers to Puerto Ricans and their descendants in the New York City area. Greater Orlando and Greater Philadelphia are the following metropolitan areas with the largest Puerto Rican populations. The largest share of Puerto Ricans in metropolitan areas are found in Springfield (23.2%), and neighboring Greater Orlando (13.7%) and Lakeland-Winter Haven (13.5%).

== Identity ==
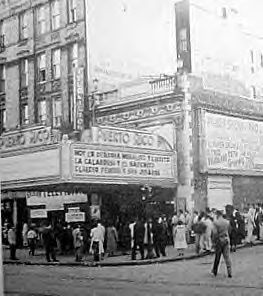
Teatro Puerto Rico in South Bronx, New York City, in the 1950s.

Puerto Ricans have been migrating to the continental United States since the 19th century and migrating since 1898, after the island territory was transferred from Spain to the United States, and have a long history of collective social advocacy for their political and social rights and preserving their cultural heritage. In New York City, which has the largest concentration of Puerto Ricans in the United States, they began running for elective office in the 1920s, electing one of their own to the New York State Assembly for the first time in 1937.

Important Puerto Rican institutions have emerged from this long history. ASPIRA was established in New York City in 1961 and is now one of the largest national Hispanic nonprofit organizations in the United States. There is also the National Puerto Rican Coalition in Washington, D.C., the National Puerto Rican Forum, the Puerto Rican Family Institute, Boricua College, the Center for Puerto Rican Studies of the City University of New York at Hunter College, the Puerto Rican Legal Defense and Education Fund, the National Conference of Puerto Rican Women and the New York League of Puerto Rican Women, Inc., among others.

The government of Puerto Rico has a long history of involvement with the stateside Puerto Rican community. In July 1930, Puerto Rico's Department of Labor established an employment service in New York City. The Migration Division, known as the Commonwealth Office, also part of Puerto Rico's Department of Labor, was created in 1948, and by the end of the 1950s, was operating in 115 cities and towns stateside.

The strength of stateside Puerto Rican identity is fueled by a number of factors. These include the large circular migration between the island and the mainland United States, a long tradition of the government of Puerto Rico promoting its ties to those stateside, the continuing existence of racial-ethnic prejudice and discrimination in the United States, and high residential and school segregation. Attributes that set the stateside Puerto Rican population apart from the rest of the US Latino community are that Puerto Ricans have the highest military enrollment rates compared to other Latinos, Puerto Ricans are more likely to be proficient in English than any other Latino group, and Puerto Ricans are also more likely to intermarry with other ethnic groups, and far more likely to intermarry with Blacks than any other Latino group.

== Migration history ==
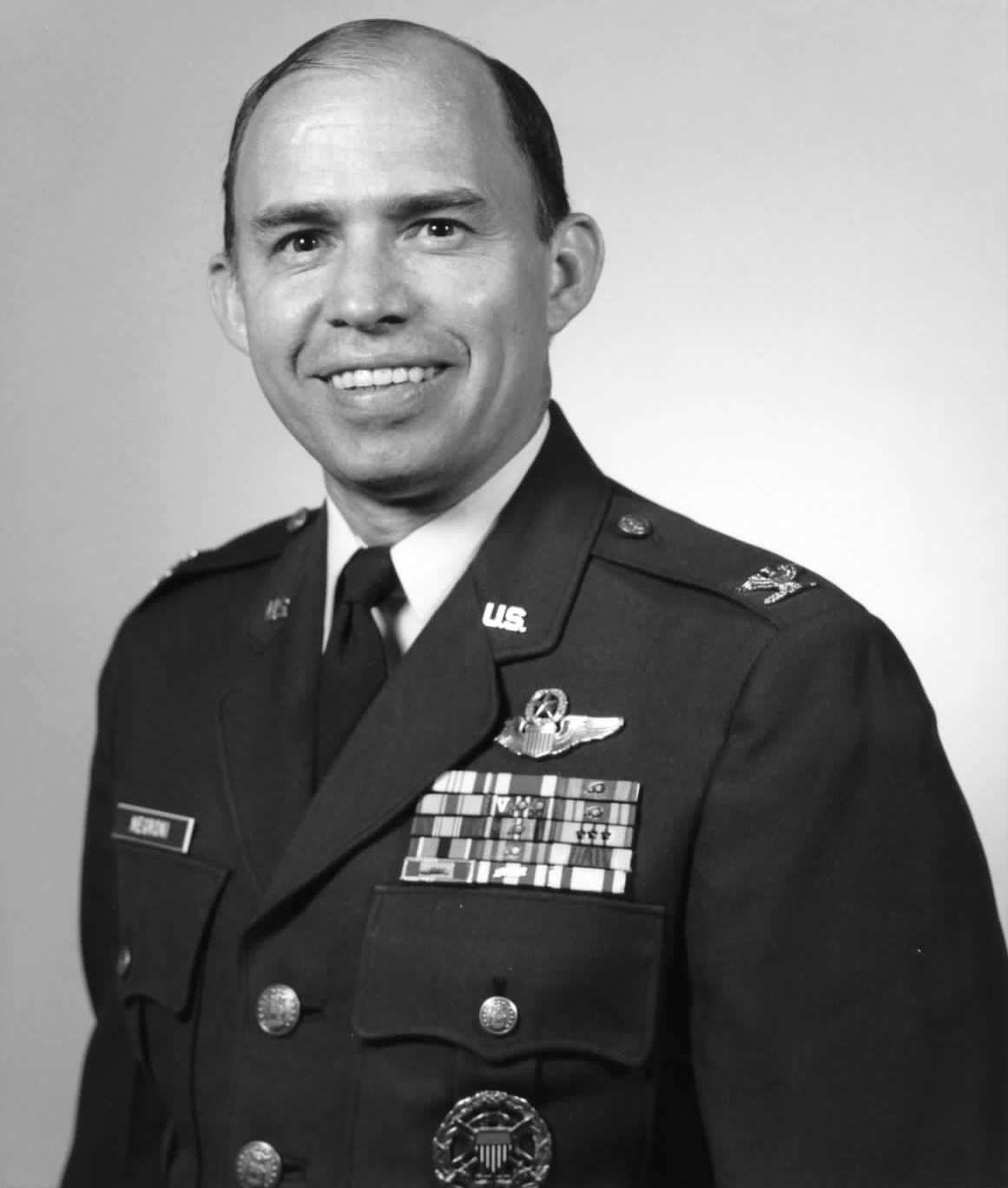
Colonel Héctor Andrés Negroni, the first Puerto Rican graduate of the U.S. Air Force Academy, was born in Yauco, Puerto Rico and moved with his family to Philadelphia as a child.

During the 19th century, commerce existed between the ports of the eastern coast of the United States and Puerto Rico. Ship records show that many Puerto Ricans traveled on ships that sailed from and to U.S. and Puerto Rico. Many of them settled in places such as New York, New Jersey, Connecticut, and Massachusetts. Upon the outbreak of the American Civil War, some Puerto Ricans joined the ranks of the military armed forces. Because Puerto Ricans were still Spanish subjects, they were inscribed as Spaniards.

Even during Spanish rule, Puerto Ricans settled in the US. During the nineteenth century it was mostly political exiles who came to the mainland. Since 1898, Puerto Rico has been an "insular possession" and "unincorporated territory" of the United States, ruled for its first half-century by American generals and non-Puerto-Rican civil servants from the mainland, fueling migratory patterns between the mainland and the island. After the end of the Spanish–American War a significant influx of Puerto Rican workers to the US began. With its 1898 victory, the United States acquired Puerto Rico from Spain and has retained sovereignty since. The 1917 Jones–Shafroth Act made all Puerto Ricans US citizens, freeing them from immigration barriers. The massive migration of Puerto Ricans to the mainland United States was largest in the early and late 20th century, prior to its resurgence in the early 21st century.

U.S. political and economic interventions in Puerto Rico created the conditions for emigration, "by concentrating wealth in the hands of US corporations and displacing workers." Policymakers "promoted colonization plans and contract labor programs to reduce the population. U.S. employers, often with government support, recruited Puerto Ricans as a source of low-wage labor to the United States and other destinations."

Puerto Ricans migrated in search of higher-wage jobs, first to New York City, and later to other cities such as Chicago, Philadelphia and Boston. In more recent years, there has been a significant resurgence in migration from Puerto Rico to New York and New Jersey, with an apparently multifactorial allure to Puerto Ricans, primarily for economic and cultural considerations; with the Puerto Rican population of the New York City area increasing from 1,177,430 in 2010 to a Census-estimated 1,494,670 in 2016, maintaining its status as the largest metropolitan concentration and cultural center for Puerto Ricans by a significant margin in the continental US.

New York City neighborhoods such as East Harlem in Upper Manhattan, the South Bronx and Bushwick, Williamsburg in Brooklyn are often the most associated with the stateside Puerto Rican population. However, the south-central portion of the Bronx (Castle Hill, Soundview, Longwood etc) has the highest concentration of Puerto Ricans in the NYC metro area. In Philadelphia, several neighborhoods in eastern North Philadelphia, especially Fairhill, have some of the highest concentrations of Puerto Ricans in the United States, Fairhill having the highest when being compared to other big city neighborhoods, with large swarths of blocks being over 80% Puerto Rican.

=== New York City ===
Nuyoricans

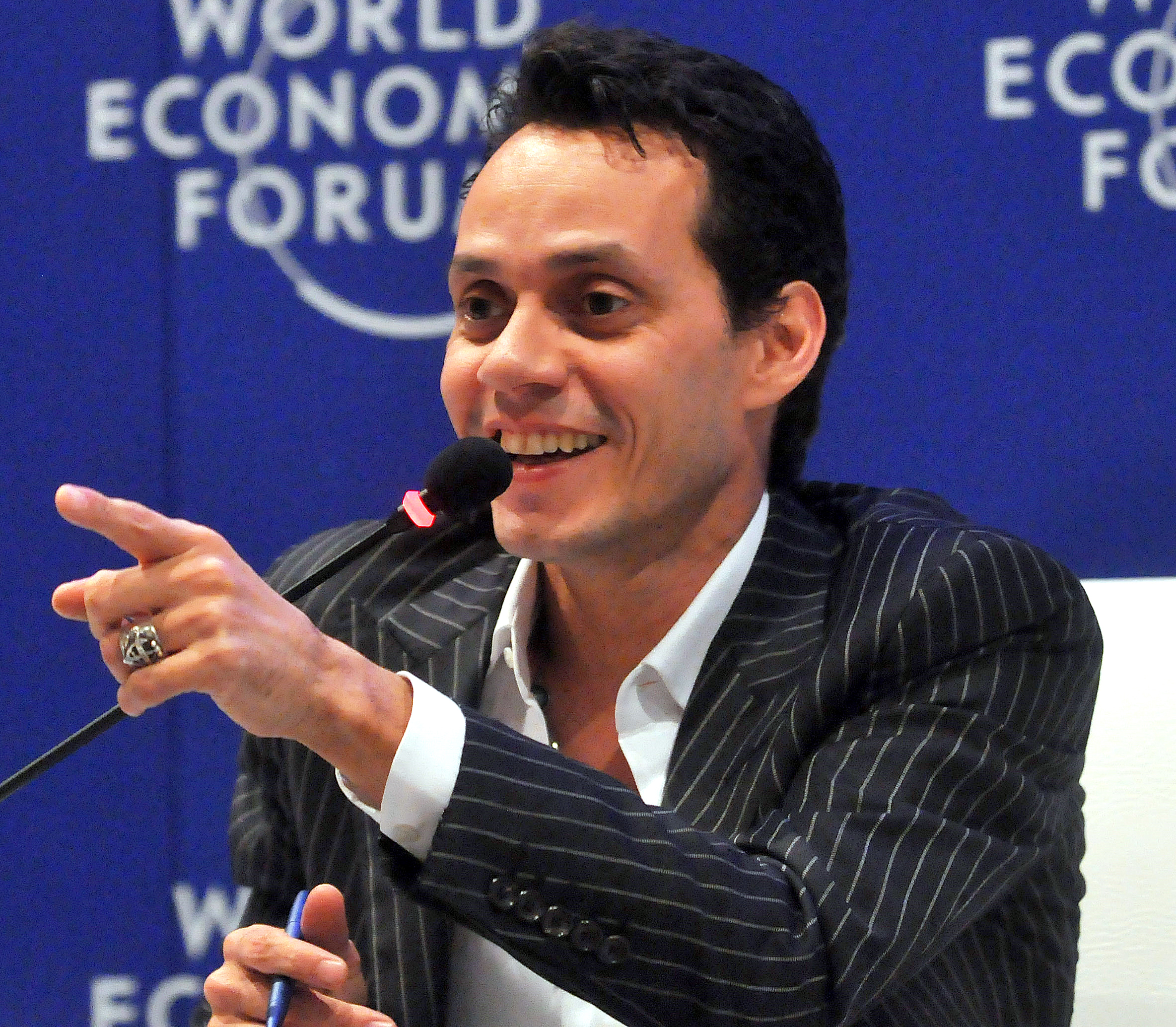
Marc Anthony

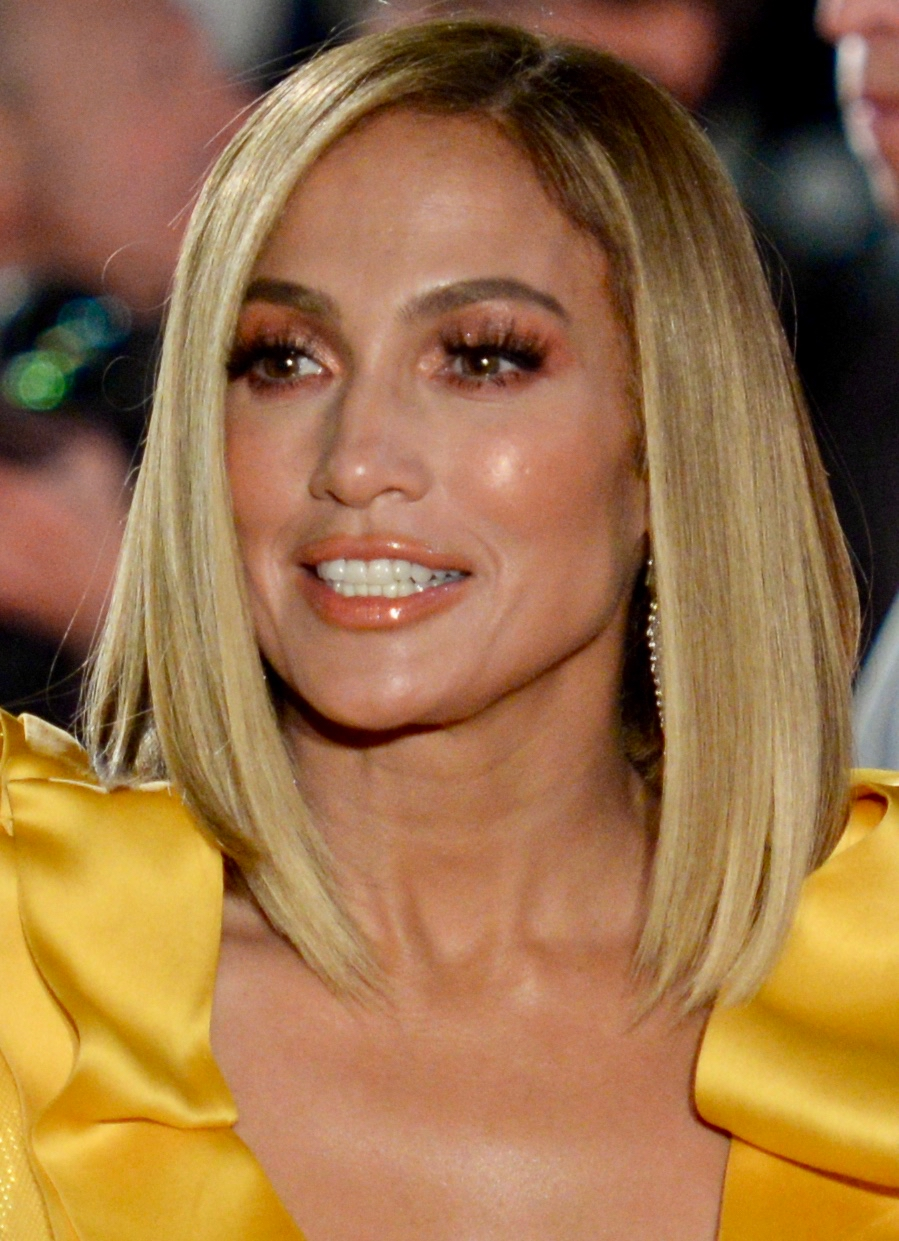
Jennifer Lopez

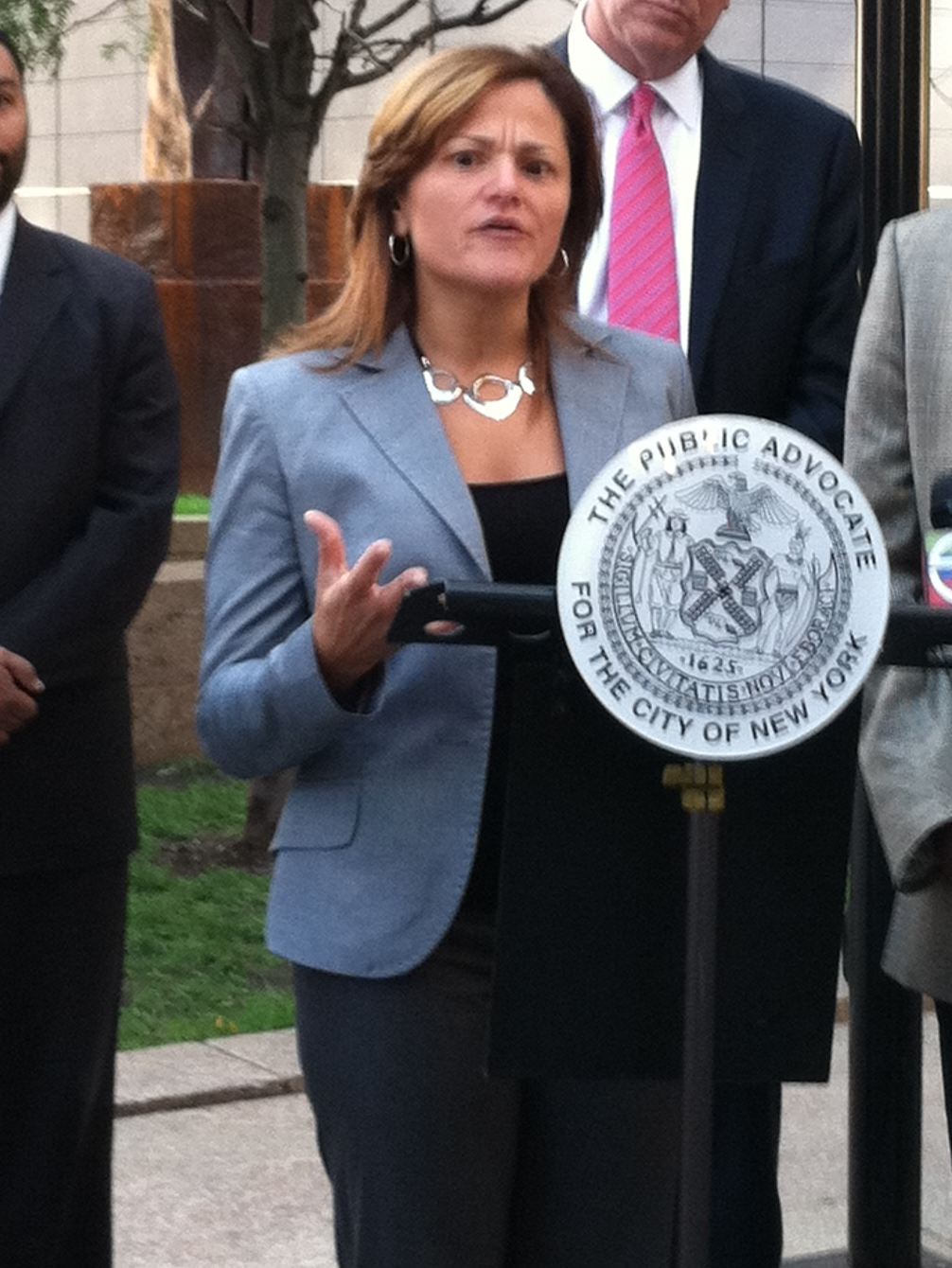
Melissa Mark-Viverito

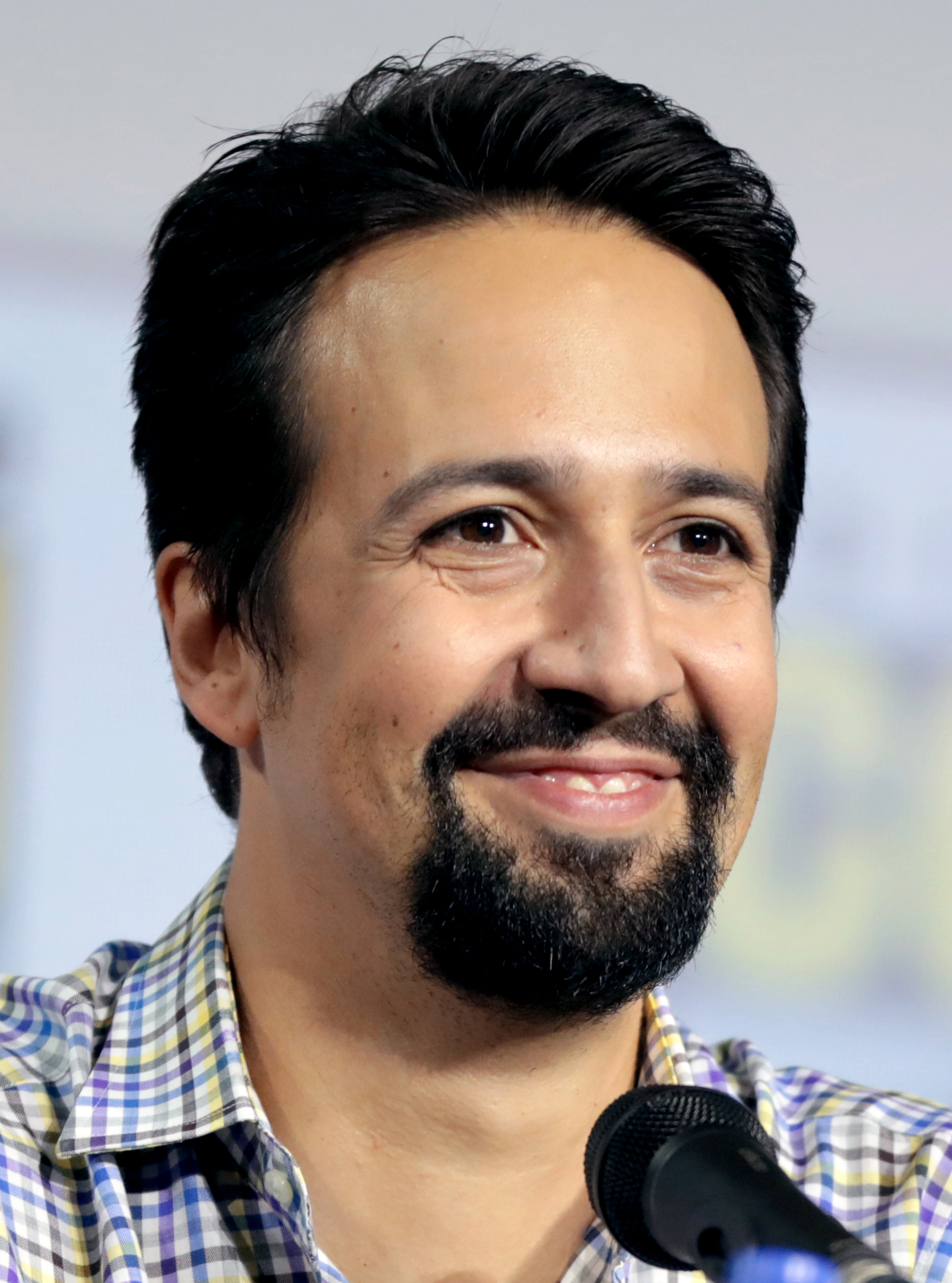
Lin-Manuel Miranda

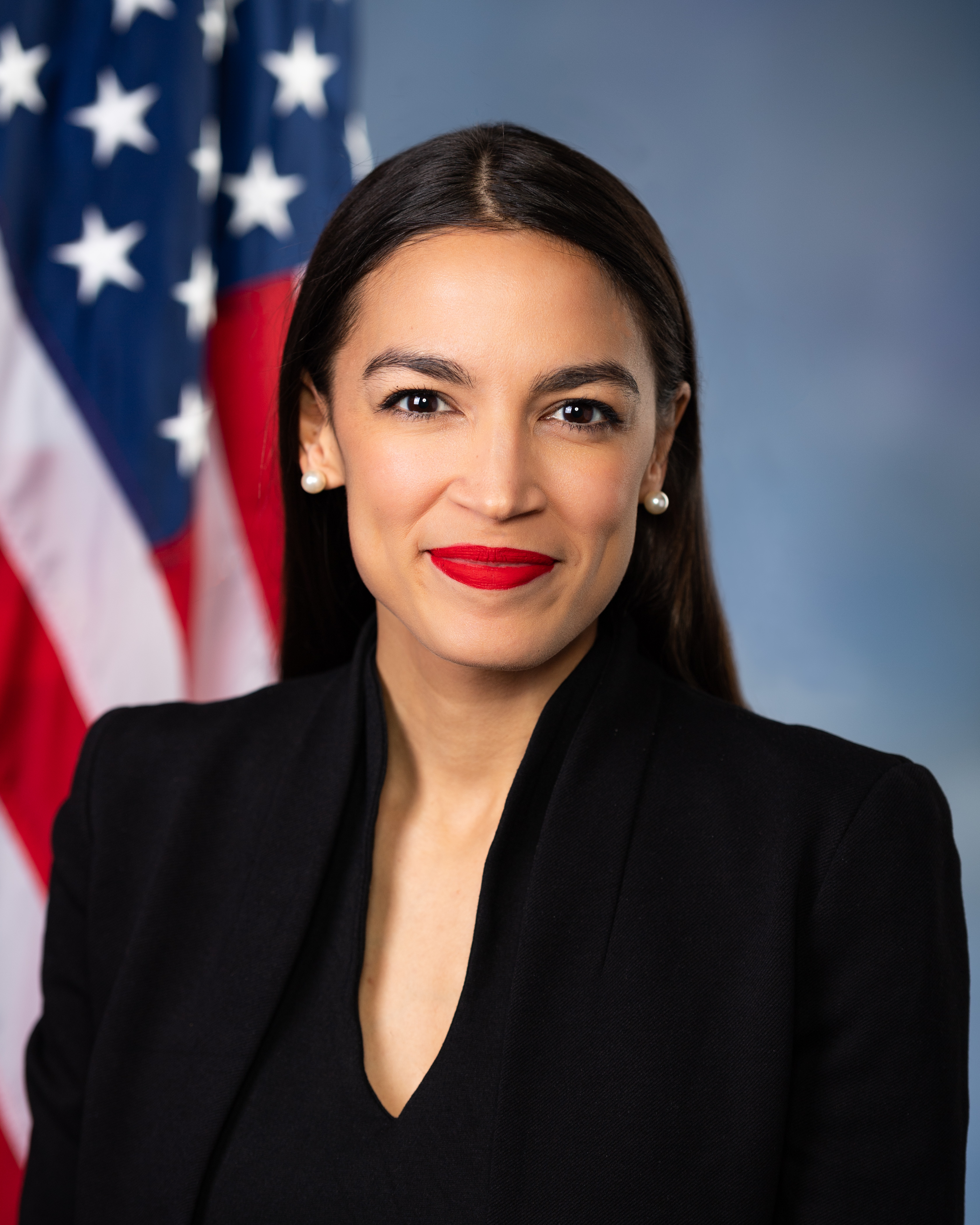
Alexandria Ocasio-Cortez

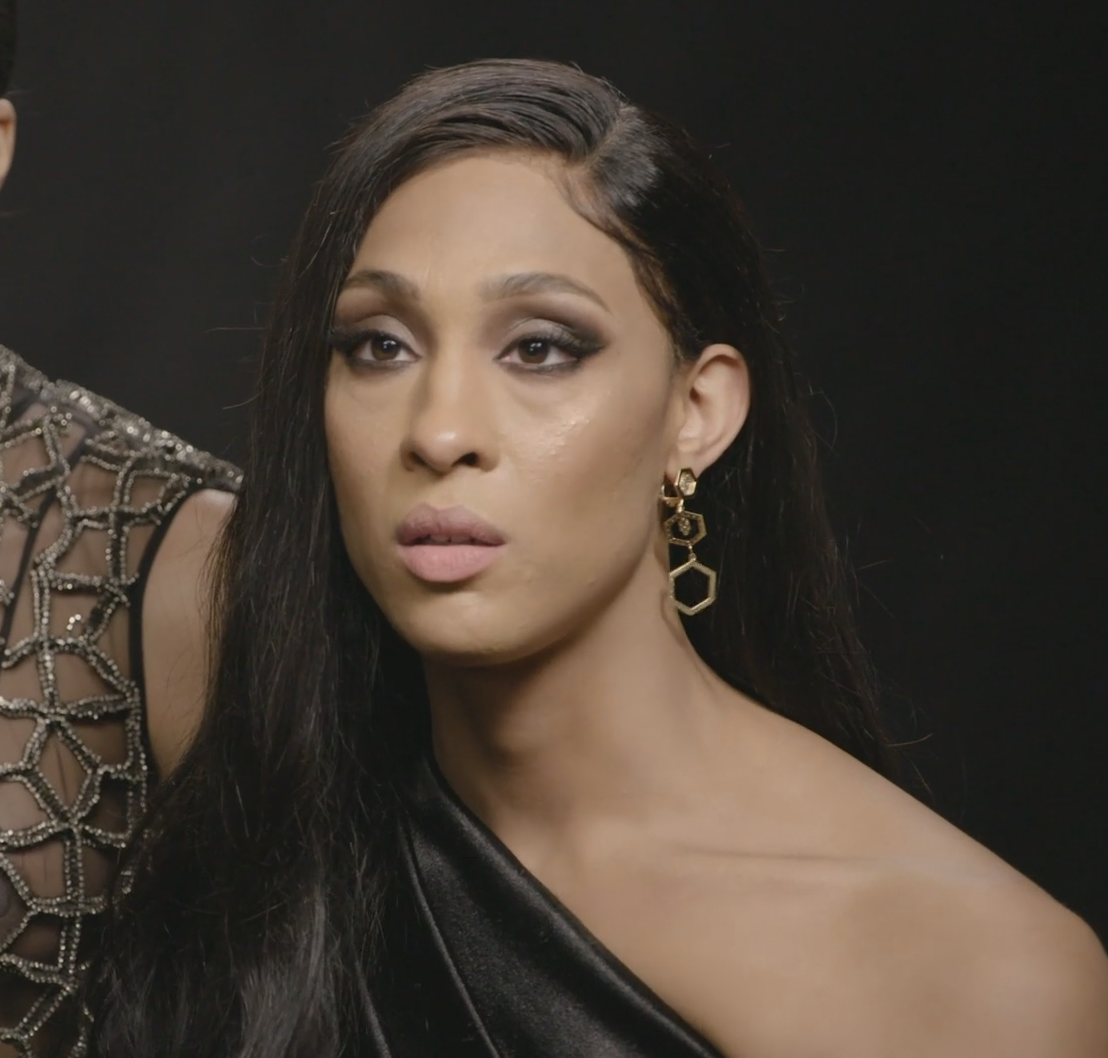
Mj Rodriguez

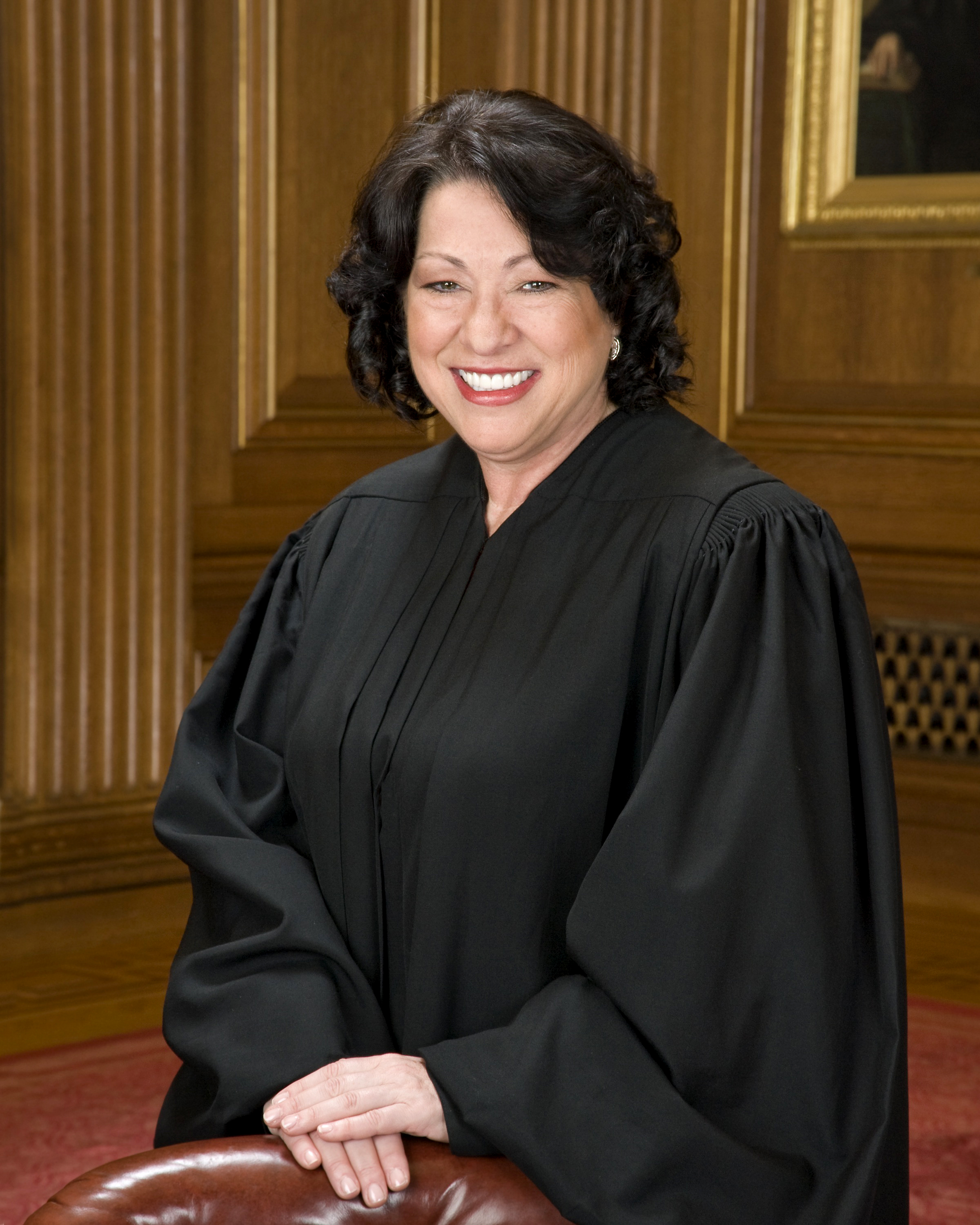
Sonia Sotomayor

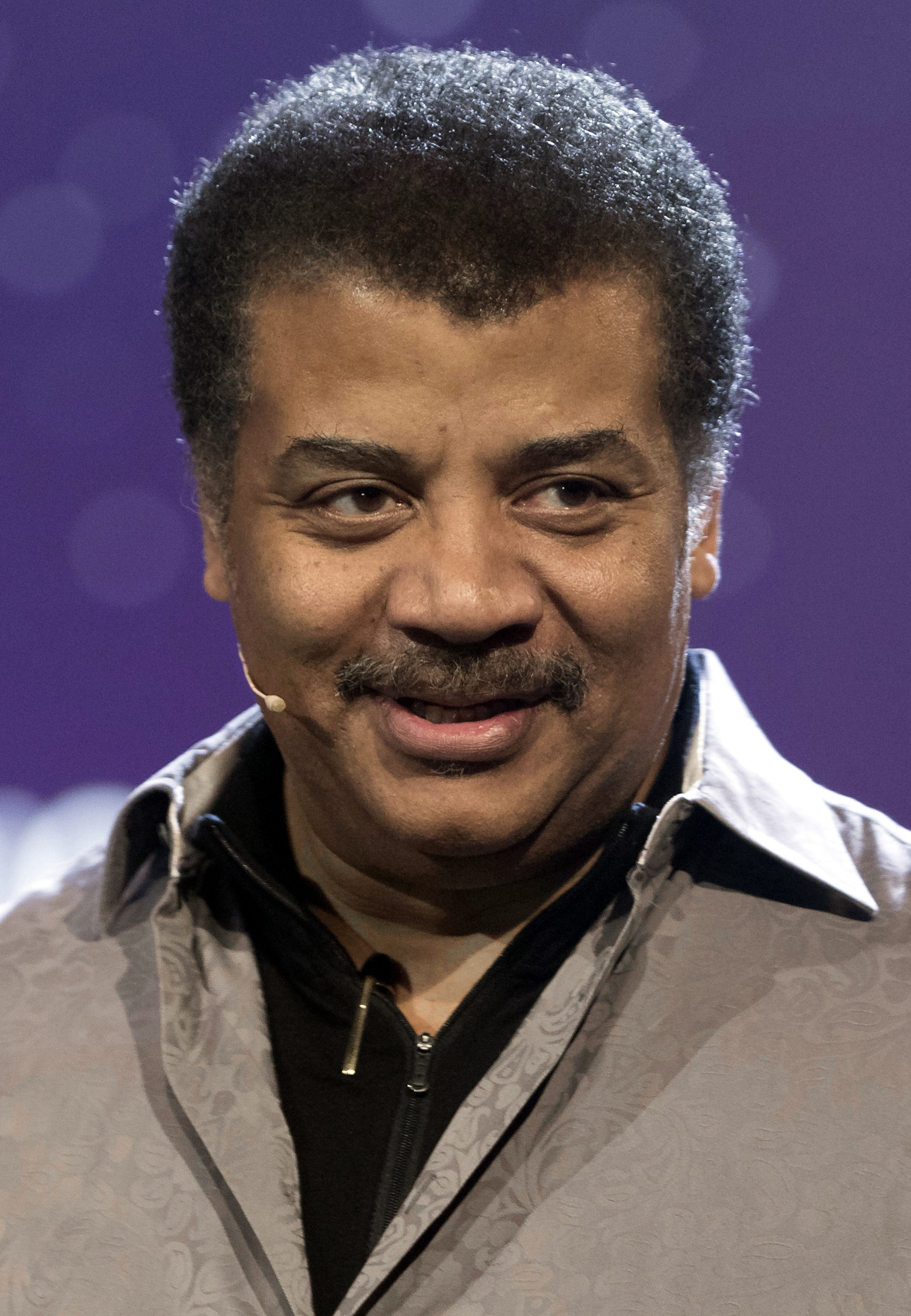
Neil deGrasse Tyson

Between the 1950s and the 1980s, large numbers of Puerto Ricans migrated to New York, especially to Brooklyn, The Bronx, and the Spanish Harlem and Loisaida neighborhoods of Manhattan. Labor recruitment was the basis of this particular community. In 1960, about 70% of stateside Puerto Ricans lived in New York City. They helped others settle, find work, and build communities by relying on social networks containing friends and family.

For a long time, Spanish Harlem (East Harlem) and Loisaida (Lower East Side) were the two major Puerto Rican communities in the city, but during the 1960s and 1970s, predominately Puerto Rican neighborhoods started to develop in the Bronx because of its proximity to East Harlem and in Brooklyn because of its proximity via the Williamsburg Bridge to the Lower East Side. There are significant Puerto Rican communities in all five boroughs of New York City.

Philippe Bourgois, an anthropologist who has studied Puerto Ricans in the inner city, suggests that "the Puerto Rican community has fallen victim to poverty through social marginalization due to the transformation of New York into a global city." The Puerto Rican population in East Harlem and New York City as a whole was the poorest among all migrant groups in US cities. In 1973, about "46.2% of the Puerto Rican migrants in East Harlem were living below the federal poverty line." More affluent Puerto Rican professionals migrated to suburban neighborhoods on Long Island and in Westchester County, New Jersey and Connecticut.

New York City also became the mecca for freestyle music in the 1980s, of which Puerto Rican singer-songwriters represented an integral component. Puerto Rican influence in popular music continues in the 21st century, encompassing major artists such as Jennifer Lopez.

=== Philadelphia ===
As of the 2010 U.S. census, there was an estimate of 121,643 Puerto Ricans living in Philadelphia, up from 91,527 in 2000. Representing 8% of Philadelphia's total population and 75% of the city's Hispanic American population, as of 2010. Puerto Ricans are the largest Hispanic group in the city and that, outside Puerto Rico, Philadelphia now has the second largest Puerto Rican population, estimated at 150,000. Since 2010, Philadelphia replaced the city of Chicago as the city with the second-largest Puerto Rican population, Chicago's slightly shrunk and Philadelphia's continued to grow, more than ever before, having the second largest Puerto Rican population and one of the fastest-growing. Most sources, including the most reliable, the United States Census Bureau, estimated that as of 2010, Puerto Ricans made up between 70 and 80 percent of Philadelphia's Latino population. Other sources put the percentage Puerto Ricans make up of Philadelphia's Latino population, as high as 90% and others as low as 64%.

=== Chicago ===
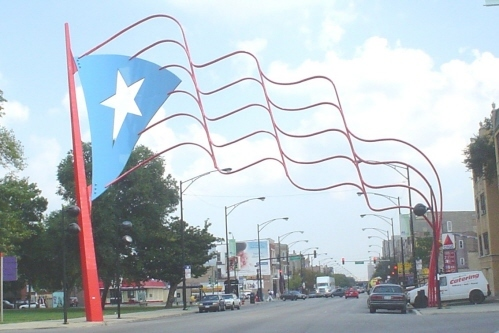
Division Street in Chicago, facing east from Mozart Street, a half block west of California Avenue.

Puerto Ricans first arrived in the early part of the 20th century from more affluent families to study at colleges or universities. In the 1930s there was an enclave around 35th and Michigan. In the 1950s two small barrios emerged known as la Clark and La Madison just North and West of Downtown, near hotel jobs and then where the factories once stood. These communities were displaced by the city as part of their slum clearance. In 1968, a community group, the Young Lords mounted protests and demonstrations and occupied several buildings of institutions demanding that they invest in low income housing. Humboldt Park is home to one of the largest Puerto Rican communities in Chicago and is known as "Little Puerto Rico" or Paseo Boricua.

=== Orlando ===
Orlando and the surrounding area has had a sizable Puerto Rican population since the 1980s, as Florida as a whole has always had a decent sized Puerto Rican population. A big contributing factor for the growth of the Puerto Rican community in Central Florida was Walt Disney World, who heavily recruited employees in Puerto Rico. Central Florida's Puerto Rican population began to skyrocket starting in the early 2000s and accelerating in the 2010s, with many New Yorkers of Puerto Rican ancestry (Nuyoricans) moving to Florida, joining the island-born Puerto Ricans.

During this time, the 1990s and early 2000s, the overall migration patterns out from Puerto Rico to the U.S. mainland began to switch and Orlando became the main destination from Puerto Rico by far, replacing New York City. Puerto Ricans are largely spread out in the Orlando area, but the heaviest concentration is in the southern portions, like Kissimmee, Poinciana and many other areas in Osceola County, where Puerto Ricans make up the majority of the population.

== Demographics of Stateside Puerto Ricans ==
Historical population
Year	Pop.	±%
1910	1,513	—
1920	11,811	+680.6%
1930	52,774	+346.8%
1940	69,967	+32.6%
1950	226,110	+223.2%
1960	892,513	+294.7%
1970	1,391,463	+55.9%
1980	2,014,000	+44.7%
1990	2,728,000	+35.5%
2000	3,406,178	+24.9%
2010	4,623,716	+35.7%
2020	5,601,863	+21.2%
2022	5,905,178	+5.4%
Source: The Puerto Rican Diaspora: Historical Perspectives

In 1950, about a quarter of a million Puerto Rican natives lived "stateside", or, in one of the U.S. states. In March 2012 that figure had risen to about 1.5 million. That is, slightly less than a third of the 5 million Puerto Ricans living stateside were born on the island. Puerto Ricans are also the second-largest Latino group in the United States after those of Mexican descent.

=== Population by state ===
==== Relative to the population of each state ====
The Puerto Rican population by state, showing the percentage of the state's population that identifies itself as Puerto Rican relative to the state/territory population as a whole is shown in the following table.

State/Territory	2020 census	% (2020)	2010 census	% (2010) (Note: Percentage of the state population that identifies itself as Puerto Rican relative to the state/territory" population as a whole.)	2000 census	% (2000)
Alabama	21,512	0.4%	12,225	0.3%	6,322	0.1%
Alaska	5,877	0.8%	4,502	0.6%	2,649	0.4%
Arizona	49,229	0.6%	34,787	0.5%	17,547	0.3%
Arkansas	9,158	0.3%	4,789	0.2%	2,473	0.0%
California	213,303	0.5%	189,945	0.5%	140,570	0.4%
Colorado	37,899	0.6%	22,995	0.5%	12,993	0.3%
Connecticut	288,344	8.0%	252,972	7.1%	194,443	5.7%
Delaware	28,922	2.9%	22,533	2.5%	14,005	1.8%
District of Columbia	4,848	0.7%	3,129	0.5%	2,328	0.4%
Florida	1,153,880	5.3%	847,550	4.5%	482,027	3.0%
(Georgia (U.S. state)) Georgia	109,009	1.0%	71,987	0.7%	35,532	0.4%
Hawaii	46,229	3.1%	44,116	3.2%	30,005	2.4%
Idaho	4,927	0.2%	2,910	0.2%	1,509	0.1%
Illinois	196,156	1.5%	182,989	1.4%	157,851	1.2%
Indiana	44,647	0.6%	30,304	0.5%	19,678	0.3%
Iowa	9,461	0.2%	4,885	0.2%	2,690	0.0%
Kansas	13,943	0.4%	9,247	0.3%	5,237	0.1%
Kentucky	18,397	0.4%	11,454	0.3%	6,469	0.1%
Louisiana	17,474	0.3%	11,603	0.3%	7,670	0.1%
Maine	6,392	0.4%	4,377	0.3	2,275	0.1%
Maryland	58,180	0.9%	42,572	0.7%	25,570	0.4%
Massachusetts	312,277	4.5%	266,125	4.1%	199,207	3.1%
Michigan	50,209	0.4%	37,267	0.4%	26,941	0.2%
Minnesota	17,509	0.3%	10,807	0.2%	6,616	0.1%
Mississippi	9,790	0.3%	5,888	0.2%	2,881	0.1%
Missouri	19,156	0.3%	12,236	0.2%	6,677	0.1%
Montana	2,260	0.2%	1,491	0.2%	931	0.1%
Nebraska	5,539	0.2%	3,242	0.2%	1,993	0.1%
Nevada	29,383	0.9%	20,664	0.8%	10,420	0.5%
New Hampshire	18,355	1.3%	11,729	0.9%	6,215	0.5%
New Jersey	459,270	4.9%	434,092	4.9%	366,788	4.3%
New Mexico	9,861	0.4%	7,964	0.4%	4,488	0.2%
New York	1,000,764	5.0%	1,070,558	5.5%	1,050,293	5.5%
North Carolina	114,917	1.1%	71,800	0.8%	31,117	0.3%
North Dakota	3,035	0.3%	987	0.1%	507	0.0%
Ohio	133,261	1.2%	94,965	0.8%	66,269	0.5%
Oklahoma	17,891	0.4%	12,223	0.3%	8,153	0.2%
Oregon	14,294	0.3%	8,845	0.2%	5,092	0.1%
Pennsylvania	456,589	3.6%	366,082	2.9%	228,557	1.8%
Rhode Island	40,762	3.8%	34,979	3.3%	25,422	2.4%
South Carolina	46,021	0.8%	26,493	0.6%	12,211	0.3%
South Dakota	3,430	0.3%	1,483	0.2%	637	0.0%
Tennessee	36,208	0.5%	21,060	0.3%	10,303	0.1%
Texas	230,462	0.7%	130,576	0.5%	69,504	0.3%
Utah	11,716	0.3%	7,182	0.3%	3,977	0.1%
Vermont	3,420	0.5%	2,261	0.4%	1,374	0.2%
Virginia	104,845	1.3%	73,958	0.9%	41,131	0.5%
Washington	39,313	0.5%	25,566	0.3%	16,140	0.2%
West Virginia	5,881	0.3%	3,701	0.2%	1,609	0.0%
Wisconsin	65,084	1.1%	46,323	0.8%	30,267	0.5%
Wyoming	1,580	0.2%	1,026	0.2%	575	0.1%
United States	5,601,863	1.6%	4,623,716	1.5%	3,406,178	1.2%

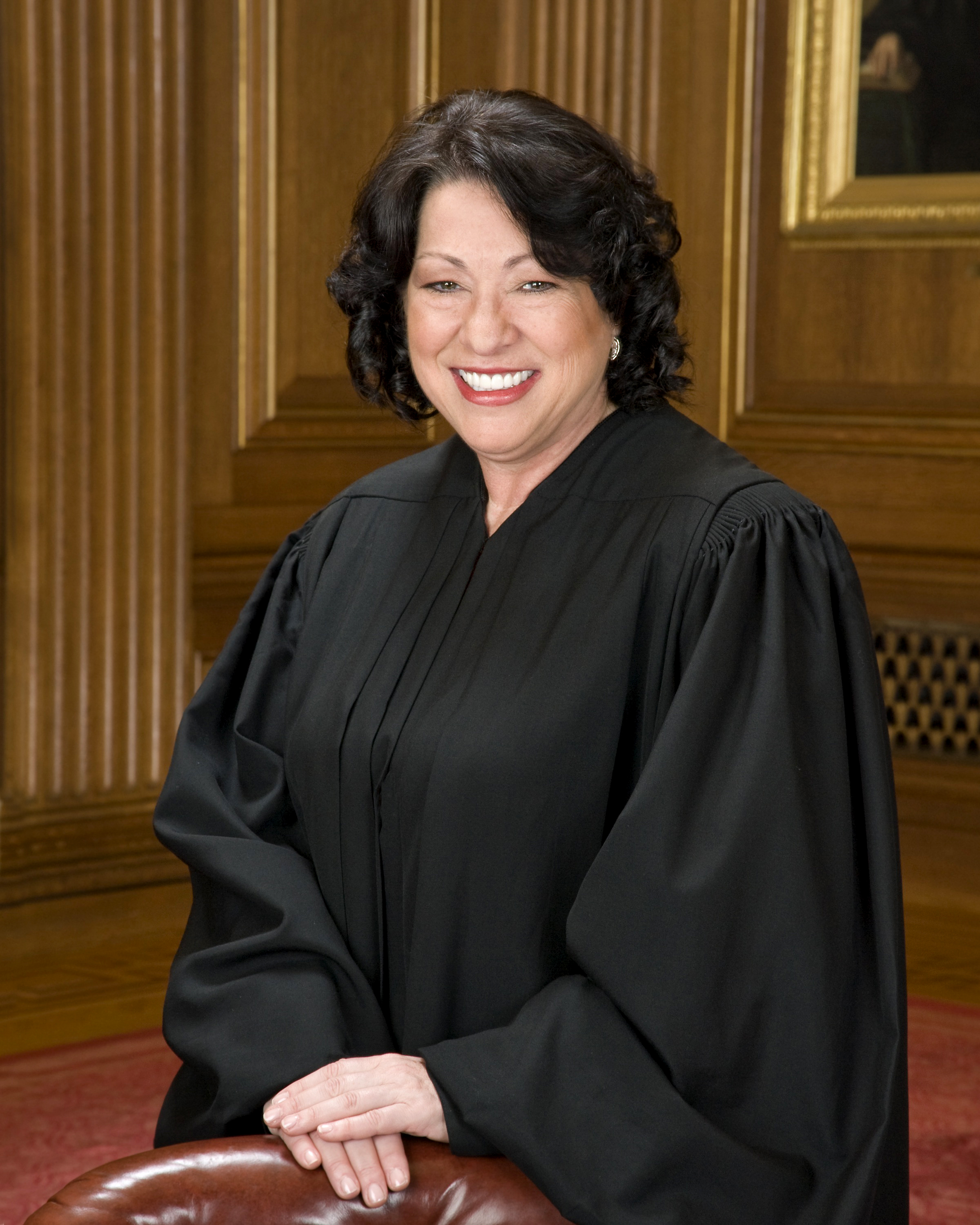
Sonia Sotomayor, born in the Bronx, Associate Justice of the United States Supreme Court.

The ten states with the largest increases of Puerto Ricans between 2010 and 2020 were: Florida (with an increase of 306,330 Puerto Ricans), Texas (99,886), Pennsylvania (90,507), Massachusetts (46,152), North Carolina (43,117), Ohio (38,296), Georgia (37,022), Connecticut (35,372), Virginia (30,887), and New Jersey (25,178). Most other states showed modest growth. The Eastern Seaboard continues to be the largest center of Stateside Puerto Ricans numerically. Of the 17 states with at least 1% Puerto Rican population, four (Hawaii, Illinois, Ohio, and Wisconsin) are located outside of the East Coast. New York was the only state to register a decrease in its Puerto Rican population in the 2020 census.

The historical settlement pattern centered around the East Coast, and some stateside-born Puerto Ricans have moved from the Northeastern states to South Atlantic States, especially to Florida. From 2010 to 2017, Florida's Puerto Rican population increased from 847,000 to 1.120 million, increasing by nearly 300,000, causing Florida to overtake New York in total Puerto Rican population. Puerto Ricans have been heavily increasing in many other parts of the country too, such as Texas and Ohio.

Puerto Rican populations in New York and New Jersey being relatively stagnant, and other parts of the Northeast continue to see very strong growth, particularly Pennsylvania and Lower New England (Massachusetts, Connecticut and Rhode Island). Pennsylvania has had the second largest numerical increase of Puerto Ricans for the past 10–15 years, showing an increase of over 110,000 from 2010 to 2017-second to Florida. Connecticut having the highest percentage of Puerto Ricans in the United States, from 2010 to 2017 (Pre-Maria) the percentage went up about 1.1 percentage points which is a percentile increase more than any other state, and currently over 8 percent of the state is of Puerto Rican ancestry, sitting nearly three whole percentage points above the second highest percentage. Of smaller states with populations under 3 million, Rhode Island has the fastest growing number of Puerto Ricans.

Puerto Ricans constitute 9 percent of the Hispanic/Latino population in the United States, and there are some states where Puerto Ricans make up a much larger portion of the Hispanic/Latino population, including Connecticut, where 46.3 percent of the state's Latinos are of Puerto Rican descent and Pennsylvania, where Puerto Ricans make up 43.5 percent of the Hispanics. Other states where Puerto Ricans make up a relatively large portion of the Hispanic community include Massachusetts, where they make up 35.2 percent of all Hispanics, New Hampshire at 30.9 percent, Delaware at 27.2 percent, Ohio at 25.6 percent, New York at 25.3 percent, New Jersey at 22.9 percent, Rhode Island at 22.4 percent, and Florida at 20.3 percent of all Hispanics/Latinos in each respective state. The U.S. States where Puerto Ricans were the largest Hispanic/Latino group were New York, New Jersey, Pennsylvania, Connecticut, Massachusetts, New Hampshire and Hawaii. U.S. states with higher percentages of Puerto Ricans then the national average (1.6%) as of 2020, are Connecticut (8.0%), Florida (5.3%), New York (5.0%), New Jersey (4.9%), Massachusetts (4.5%), Rhode Island (3.8%), Pennsylvania (3.6%), Hawaii (3.1%), and Delaware (2.9%).

Historically, Puerto Ricans were the largest Hispanic/Latino group in the New York metropolitan area. The Puerto Rican population in the area began to decrease due to rising cost of living and in turn the overall Hispanic population began to diversify with increases in other Hispanic groups. During the same time, the Puerto Rican population has increased in many other areas throughout the country and in areas with large Hispanic communities, Puerto Ricans represent the majority of Hispanic/Latinos in the following; Central Florida around Orlando, but also some areas in the Tampa and Jacksonville areas, southwest New England especially around Hartford and Springfield, South Jersey and Eastern Pennsylvania including the Philadelphia area and various smaller metro areas like Allentown among others, and the stretch from Western New York to Northeast Ohio including the metropolitan areas of Rochester, Buffalo and Cleveland. Hispanic/Latino populations in the Northeast Ohio and Western New York areas in particular, tend to be 80–90% Puerto Rican. Central Florida and Southwestern New England, which is Connecticut and western Massachusetts, have the highest concentrations of Puerto Ricans by percentage of the total populations of these areas as a whole.

The Puerto Rican population in the United States, 2000.

==== Relative to the Puerto Rican population nationwide ====
Puerto Rican population by state, showing the percentage of Puerto Rican residents in each state relative to the Puerto Rican population in the United States as a whole.

State/Territory	Puerto Ricans Population (2020 Census)	Percentage (Note: Percentage of Puerto Rican residents in each state relative to the Puerto Rican population in the United States as a whole. Puerto Rican population in the U.S. according to the 2010 U.S. Census: 4,623,716)
Florida	1,153,880	20.60
New York	1,000,764	17.87
New Jersey	459,270	8.20
Pennsylvania	456,589	8.16
Massachusetts	312,277	5.78
Connecticut	288,344	5.14
Texas	230,462	4.12
California	213,303	3.80
Illinois	196,156	3.50
Ohio	133,261	2.38
North Carolina	114,917	2.04
Georgia	109,009	1.95
Virginia	104,845	1.88
Wisconsin	65,084	1.16
Maryland	58,180	1.03
Michigan	50,209	0.89
Arizona	49,229	0.87
Hawaii	46,229	0.82
South Carolina	46,021	0.82
Indiana	44,647	0.79
Rhode Island	40,762	0.72
Washington	39,313	0.70
Colorado	37,899	0.67
Tennessee	36,208	0.64
Nevada	29,383	0.52
Delaware	28,922	0.51
Alabama	21,512	0.38
Missouri	19,156	0.34
Kentucky	18,397	0.32
New Hampshire	18,355	0.32
Oklahoma	17,891	0.31
Minnesota	17,509	0.31
Louisiana	17,474	0.31
Oregon	14,294	0.25
Kansas	13,943	0.24
Utah	11,716	0.20
New Mexico	9,861	0.17
Mississippi	9,790	0.17
Iowa	9,461	0.16
Arkansas	9,158	0.16
Maine	6,392	0.11
West Virginia	5,881	0.10
Alaska	5,877	0.10
Nebraska	5,539	0.09
Idaho	4,927	0.08
DC	4,848	0.08
South Dakota	3,430	0.06
Vermont	3,420	0.06
North Dakota	3,035	0.05
Montana	2,260	0.04
Wyoming	1,580	0.02
United States	5,601,863	100

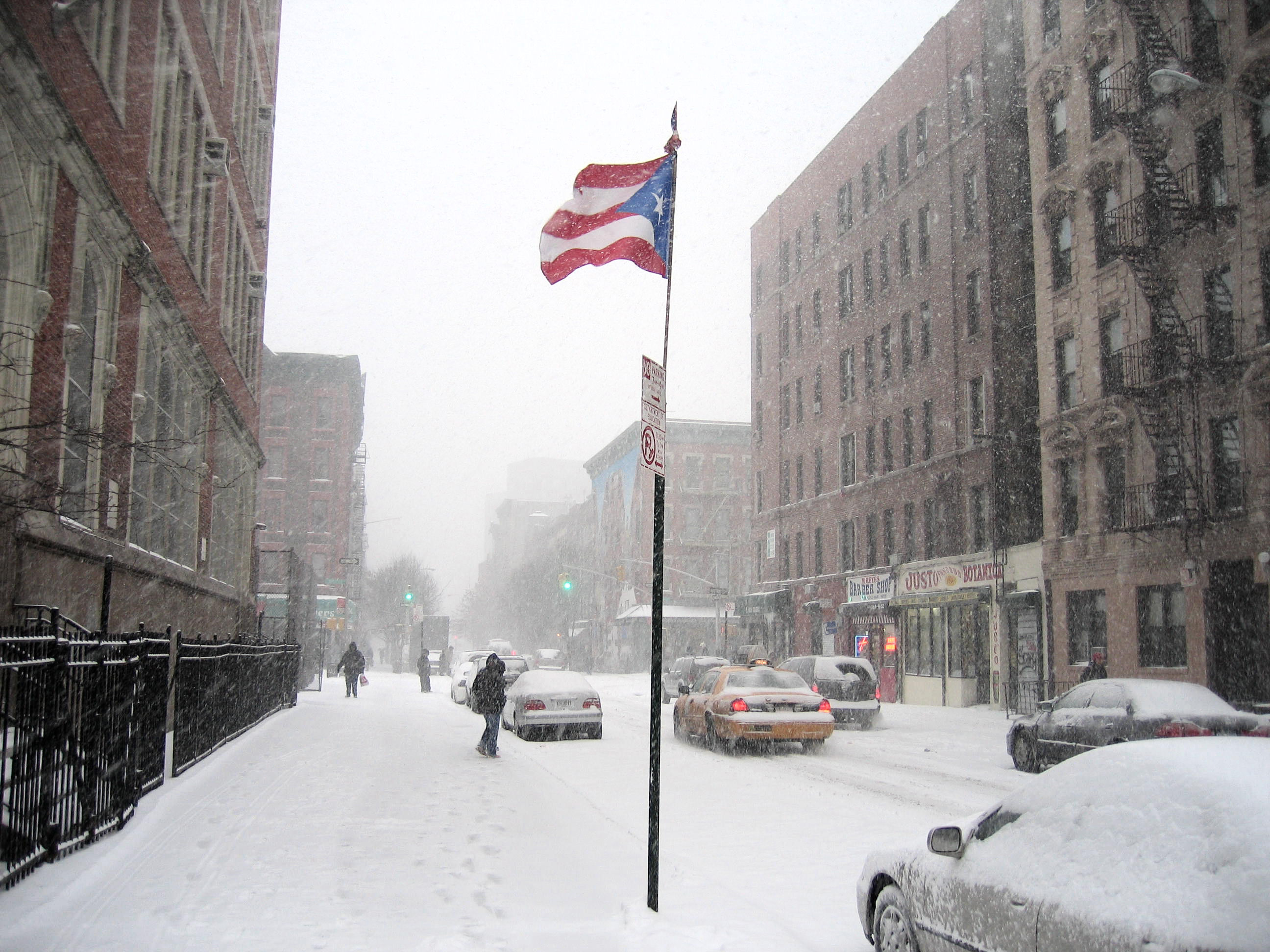
The Puerto Rican flag in East Harlem in New York City, outside of the Julia de Burgos Cultural Center, winter 2005.

Even with such movement of Puerto Ricans from traditional to non-traditional states, the Northeast continues to dominate in both concentration and population.

The largest populations of Puerto Ricans are situated in the following metropolitan areas (Source: 2020 ACS 5-Year Estimates):

1. New York-Northern New Jersey-Long Island, NY-NJ-PA MSA – 1,173,031
2. Orlando-Kissimmee-Sanford, FL MSA – 386,706
3. Philadelphia-Camden-Wilmington, PA-NJ-DE-MD MSA – 278,515
4. Miami-Fort Lauderdale-Pompano Beach, FL MSA – 225,998
5. Chicago-Joliet-Naperville, IL-IN-WI MSA – 207,526
6. Tampa-St. Petersburg-Clearwater, FL MSA – 201,587
7. Boston-Cambridge-Quincy, MA-NH MSA – 136,015
8. Hartford-East Hartford-Middletown, CT MSA – 120,494
9. Springfield, MA MSA – 105,545
10. New Haven-Milford, CT MSA – 90,996

=== Communities with largest populations of Puerto Ricans ===
The top 25 US communities with the largest populations of Puerto Ricans (Source: Census 2020)

1. New York City, NY – 595,627
2. Philadelphia, PA – 127,114
3. Chicago, IL – 93,193
4. Springfield, MA – 58,994
5. Orlando, FL – 41,105
6. Hartford, CT – 37,751
7. Cleveland, OH – 34,127
8. Allentown, PA – 33,531
9. Newark, NJ – 33,171
10. Jacksonville, FL – 33,137
11. Rochester, NY – 32,437
12. Reading, PA – 29,732
13. Bridgeport, CT – 28,855
14. Waterbury, CT – 28,840
15. Milwaukee, WI – 28,518
16. Boston, MA – 27,985
17. Buffalo, NY – 27,895
18. Poinciana, FL – 27,092
19. Tampa, FL – 26,355
20. Worcester, MA – 25,880
21. Kissimmee, FL – 25,572
22. New Britain, CT – 24,978
23. Deltona, FL – 23,073
24. Jersey City, NJ – 21,600
25. New Haven, CT – 21,067

=== Communities with high percentages of Puerto Ricans ===
The top 25 US communities (over 5,000 in population) with the highest percentages of Puerto Ricans as a percent of their total populations (Source: Census 2020)

1. Holyoke, MA – 45.8%
2. Buenaventura Lakes, FL – 42.2%
3. Poinciana, FL – 39.0%
4. Springfield, MA – 37.8%
5. Azalea Park, FL – 34.8%
6. New Britain, CT – 33.6%
7. Lebanon, PA – 32.3%
8. Kissimmee, FL – 32.2%
9. Willimantic, CT – 31.4%
10. Reading, PA – 31.2%
11. Hartford, CT – 31.1%
12. Southbridge, MA – 30.4%
13. Dunkirk, NY – 30.1%
14. St. Cloud, FL – 29.5%
15. Camden, NJ – 28.9%
16. Meadow Woods, FL – 27.8%
17. Vineland, NJ – 27.5%
18. Lancaster, PA – 26.6%
19. Union Park, FL – 26.7%
20. Allentown, PA – 26.6%
21. Amsterdam, NY – 26.2%
22. Waterbury, CT – 25.2%
23. Deltona, FL – 24.6%
24. Meriden, CT – 23.9%
25. York, PA – 23.1%

The 10 large cities (over 200,000 in population) with the highest percentages of Puerto Rican residents include (2020 Census):

1. Rochester, NY – 15.3%
2. Orlando, FL – 13.3%
3. Worcester, MA – 12.5%
4. Newark, NJ – 10.6%
5. Buffalo, NY – 10.0%
6. Yonkers, NY – 9.5%
7. Cleveland, OH – 9.1%
8. Philadelphia, PA – 7.9%
9. Jersey City, NJ – 7.2%
10. Tampa, FL – 6.8%

=== Dispersion before 2000 ===
Like other groups, the theme of "dispersal" has had a long history with the stateside Puerto Rican community. More recent demographic developments appear at first blush as if the stateside Puerto Rican population has been dispersing in greater numbers. Duany had described this process as a "reconfiguration" and termed it the "nationalizing" of this community throughout the United States.

New York City was the center of the stateside Puerto Rican community for most of the 20th century. It is not clear whether these settlement changes can be characterized as simple population dispersal. Puerto Rican population settlements today are less concentrated than they were in places like New York City, Chicago and a number of cities in Massachusetts, Connecticut and New Jersey.

== Migration trends since 2000 ==
New York State has resumed its net in-migration of Puerto Ricans since 2006, a dramatic reversal from being the only state to register a decrease in its Puerto Rican population between 1990 and 2000. The Puerto Rican population of New York State, still the largest in the United States, is estimated by the U.S. Census Bureau to have increased from 1,070,558 in 2010 to 1,103,067 in 2013.

Puerto Rican migration trends since 2006 have been highly complex: New York State gained more Puerto Rican migrants from Puerto Rico (31% of the mainland total) as well as from elsewhere on the mainland (20% of interstate moves) between 2006 and 2012 than any other U.S. state, in absolute numbers, and the southern United States gained the highest number as an overall national region. Also, unlike the initial pattern of migration several decades ago, this second significant Puerto Rican migration into New York and surrounding states is being driven by movement into New York City and into the city's surrounding suburban areas, including areas outside New York State, especially Northern New Jersey, such that the New York City metropolitan area gained the highest number of additional Puerto Ricans of any metropolitan area between 2010 and 2016, from 1,177,430 in 2010 to 1,494,670 in 2016.

Florida witnessed a larger increase than New York State between 2010 and 2013, from 847,550 in 2010 to 987,663 in 2013, with significant migration from Puerto Rico, as well as some migration from Chicago and New York to Florida. Most of the Puerto Rican migration to Florida has been to the central portion of the state, surrounding Orlando. Orlando and to a lesser degree Philadelphia and Tampa have witnessed large increases in their Puerto Rican populations between 2010 and 2013 and now have some of the fastest growing Puerto Rican populations in the country. According to the Pew Research Center, Puerto Rican arrivals from the island since 2000 are also less well off than earlier migrants, with lower household incomes and a greater likelihood of living in poverty. After Hurricane Maria struck Puerto Rico in September 2017, devastating the infrastructure of the island, New York, Florida and New Jersey were expected to be the three likeliest destinations for Puerto Rican migrants to the U.S. mainland when premised upon family ties.

Since Hurricane Maria in September 2017, about 400,000 Puerto Ricans have left the island for the US mainland, either permanently or temporarily, nearly half of which went to the state of Florida alone, especially to the metropolitan areas of Orlando and Miami, and to a lesser degree Tampa and Jacksonville. The other half are spreading out throughout the country but went mostly to the metropolitan areas of Philadelphia, New York, Boston, Chicago, Cleveland and numerous smaller cities across the US Northeast. The 2017 total population count of stateside Puerto Ricans was 5.5 million. With the migration boom due to Hurricane Maria, as well as live births taken into account, the US Puerto Rican population is estimated at 5.8 million as of 2018. This drop in Puerto Rico's population resulting in the increase in the stateside Puerto Rican population, is the result of Hurricane Maria and other natural disasters, as well as economic decline on the island. Many Puerto Ricans have since been moving back, though not enough to reverse the population decline in Puerto Rico.

There is also a growing number of Puerto Ricans living in military towns, such as Killeen (Texas), Columbus (Georgia), and the Hampton Roads metro area of Virginia.

=== Concentration ===
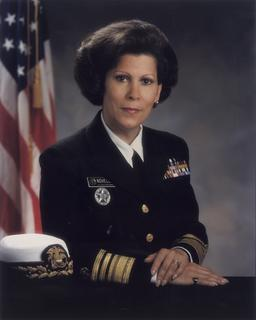
Antonia Novello – Surgeon General of the United States, 1990-1993.

Residential segregation is a phenomenon characterizing many stateside Puerto Rican population concentrations. African-Americans are the most residentially segregated group in the United States, and a 2002 study shows that stateside Puerto Ricans are the most segregated among US Latinos.

- Bridgeport, Connecticut (score of 73)
- Hartford, Connecticut (70)
- New York City (69)
- Philadelphia, Pennsylvania (69)
- Newark, New Jersey (69)
- Cleveland-Lorain-Elyria, Ohio (68)

Stateside Puerto Ricans are disproportionately clustered in what has been called the "Boston-New York-Philadelphia-Washington Corridor" and in Florida along the East Coast. The U.S. Northeast Corridor, coined a "megalopolis" by geographer Jean Gottman in 1956, is the largest and most affluent urban corridor in the world, being described as a "node of wealth ... [an] area where the pulse of the national economy beats loudest and the seats of power are well established." With major universities clustered in Boston and throughout this corridor, the economic and media power and international power politics in New York City and the seat of the federal government in Washington, DC, also a major global power center.

=== Segmentation ===
These shifts in the relative sizes of Latino populations have also changed the role of the stateside Puerto Rican community. Thus, many long-established Puerto Rican institutions have had to revise their missions (and, in some cases, change their names) to provide services and advocacy on behalf of non-Puerto Rican Latinos.

== Race ==
Puerto Ricans in the United States – 2010 U.S Census
Self-identified Race	Percent of population
White alone	53.1%
Black	8.7%
Asian	0.5%
American Indians and Alaska Natives	0.9%
Native Hawaiians and Other Pacific Islanders	0.2%
Two or more races	8.7%
Some Other Race	27.8%
Total	100%

According to the 2010 US census, of the stateside Puerto Rican population, about 53.1% self-identified as white, about 8.7% self-identified as black, about 0.9% as American Indian, about 0.5% as Asian, and 36.7% as mixed or other. Over half self-identified as white, and the Puerto Rican population is largely made up of multi-racials, most Puerto Ricans are mixed to varying degrees, usually of white European/North African, black West African and indigenous Taino ancestry. The average genomewide individual ancestry proportions have been estimated as 56% European, 28% West African and 16% Native American. There are significant numbers of (pure or nearly pure) blacks and whites within the Puerto Rican population as well. Historically, under Spanish and American rule, Puerto Rico underwent a whitening process, in particular, the island had laws like the Regla del Sacar, in which mixed-race people of mostly European origin were classified as "white" (the opposite of the 19th-century one-drop rule in the United States).

Puerto Ricans, on average, have genetic contributions from Europeans, North Africans, West Africans, and Native Americans. The island has a higher degree of tri-hybrid admixture than most countries in Latin America. A recent study of DNA in a census-based sample of 642 Puerto Rican individuals, demonstrated that almost all modern Puerto Ricans are admixed descendants of the three ancestral populations (Taínos, Europeans, and Africans). The study shows that the average Puerto Rican on the Eastern region is 54.7% European, 31.8% African, and 13.5% Native American, while the average Puerto Rican on the Western Region is 68.5% European, 15.9% African, and 15.6% Native American. The highest indigenous ancestry recorded in the study was nearly 40%.

== Culture ==
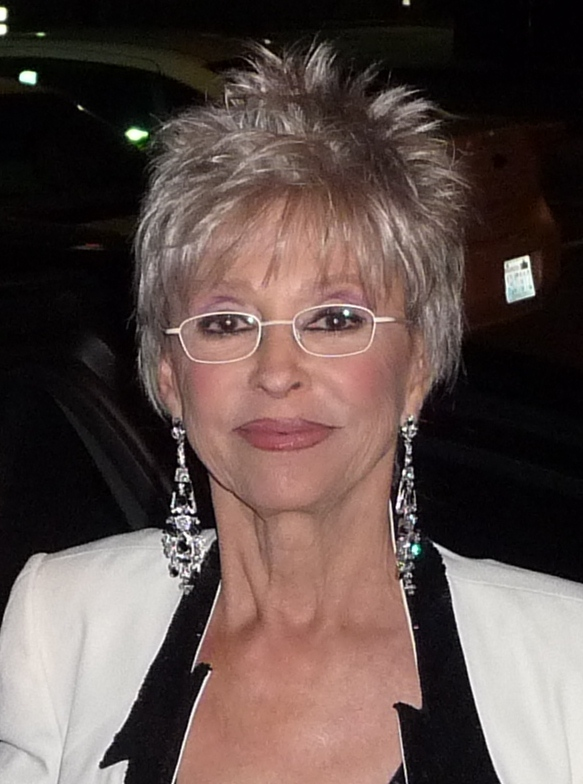
Rita Moreno actress, dancer, and singer.

Puerto Rican culture is a blend of Spanish, Taíno and West African cultures, with recent influences from the United States and neighboring Latin American and Caribbean countries. Due to Puerto Rico's status as a US territory, people in Puerto Rico have the most exposure to US culture and Puerto Ricans in the mainland United States tend to be the most "Americanized" of all major Hispanic groups. First-generation Puerto Rico-born migrants tend to be more traditional, while people born in the US mainland of Puerto Rican ancestry tend to merge traditional Puerto Rican culture with mainland American culture.

=== Language ===
The Puerto Rican variant of Spanish is mainly derived from the Spanish spoken in southern Spain and the Canary Islands. It also has noticeable influences from numerous languages, including Taíno and various West African languages. It is very similar to other Caribbean Spanish variants.

About 83% of Puerto Ricans living in the United States ages 5 and older speak English proficiently, of whom 53% are bilingual in Spanish and English, and another 30% speak only English fluently with little proficiency in Spanish. The other 17% speak only Spanish fluently and report speaking English "less than very well" with little proficiency in English, compared to 34% of Latinos overall who report doing so. According to a 2014 poll, 20% of Puerto Ricans living in the mainland United States speak Spanish at home, and 78% chose to answer the poll in English instead of Spanish, significantly more than other Latino groups polled.

Many first- and second- generation Puerto Ricans living in New York speak "Nuyorican English", a mix of local New York English with Puerto Rican Spanish influences, while many Puerto Ricans living in other US cities speak with a similar English accent. More Americanized Puerto Ricans speak the local English accent with little to no Spanish traces, sounding similar to other local groups including Black Americans or assimilated Italian Americans.

=== Religion ===
The vast majority of Puerto Ricans in the United States are adherents of Christianity. Catholics are the largest in number, and there are also significant numbers of followers of numerous Protestant denominations. Protestants make up a larger proportion of the Stateside Puerto Rican population than they do of the population of Puerto Rico. Some Puerto Rican Catholics also cohesively practice Santería, a Yoruba-Catholic syncretic mix. Smaller portions of the population are non-religious. A very small number of assimilated stateside Puerto Ricans practice other religions, particularly in the inner city neighborhoods of Philadelphia and New York.

=== Sports ===
The most popular sports among stateside Puerto Ricans are baseball and boxing, with sports like American football and basketball also having a strong following. Roberto Clemente and Hector Camacho are popular Puerto Rican athletes. Some stateside Puerto Ricans who recently emerged as pro athletes include Carmelo Anthony, Victor Cruz, Carlos Beltran, Yadier Molina, and Francisco Lindor.

=== Music ===
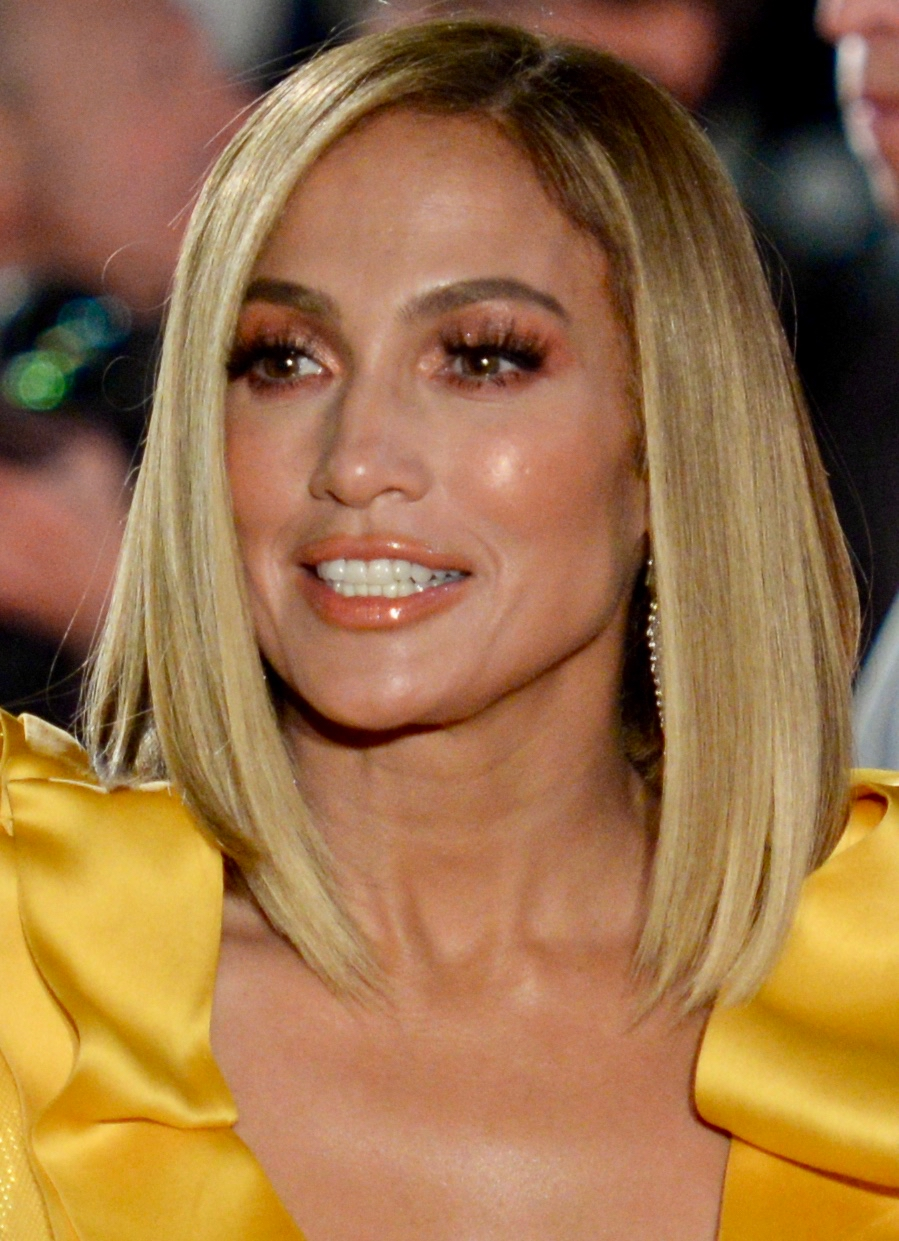
Jennifer Lopez, one of the highest-grossing and most multi-faceted triple threat entertainers in global history, is a Nuyorican, born in the Bronx.

Salsa, Reggaeton, Bachata, Merengue, Latin Pop and Latin Trap are the most popular music genres amongst many Stateside Puerto Ricans. Much older Puerto Ricans who were raised on the stateside since childhood, instead of coming at a later age usually prefer Latin Freestyle and/or Hip-hop, usually that of the 1980s and 1990s. Other musical genres such as Pop, Rock, Hip-Hop, R&B, Reggae, Dance, House, Techno, Bolero, Ballads, and Heavy Metal are popular within many Puerto Ricans who mainly use English as their first language. Bomba, Plena, and Jibaro also have a big music population and community amongst many Stateside Puerto Ricans and can mostly be played during celebrations, especially during Christmas. New York Puerto Ricans helped form many genres including Boogaloo and Salsa in the 1960s and 1970s and Hip Hop, Latin house and Latin Freestyle in the 1980s, usually with the help of other ethnic groups. Some stateside Puerto Ricans who emerged as popular musicians include Marc Anthony, Jennifer Lopez and Big Pun.

=== Intermarriage ===
Puerto Ricans have a 38.5% intermarriage rate, the highest amongst Hispanic groups in the United States. Puerto Rican intermarriage and procreation rates are highest with Dominican Americans, another Caribbean Hispanic group with very similar culture, high US population numbers, and that usually live in the same neighborhoods. There are also relatively high rates with other groups such as African Americans, Jewish Americans, Italian Americans, Mexican Americans, Cuban Americans, Trinidadian Americans, Haitian Americans, British Americans, Jamaican Americans and Irish Americans.

=== Contributions ===
Numerous Puerto Ricans born and raised in the United States made cultural contributions in government, military, television, music, sports, art, law enforcement, modeling, education, journalism, religion, science, among other areas. Conversely, cultural ties between New York and Puerto Rico are strong. In September 2017, following the immense destruction wrought upon Puerto Rico by Hurricane Maria, New York Governor Andrew Cuomo led an aid delegation to San Juan, including engineers from the New York Power Authority to help restore Puerto Rico's electrical grid; subsequently, on the one-year anniversary of the storm, in September 2018, Governor Cuomo announced plans for the official New York State memorial to honor the victims of Hurricane Maria, to be built in Battery Park City, Manhattan, citing the deep cultural connections shared between New Yorkers and Puerto Ricans. The Hurricane Maria Memorial was unveiled on March 26, 2021 in lower Manhattan.

=== Cuisine ===
The Jibarito represents a stateside Puerto Rican culinary creation, distinguished by its substitution of traditional bread with flattened, deep-fried plantains. This innovative sandwich originated in Chicago.

== Socioeconomics ==
=== Income ===
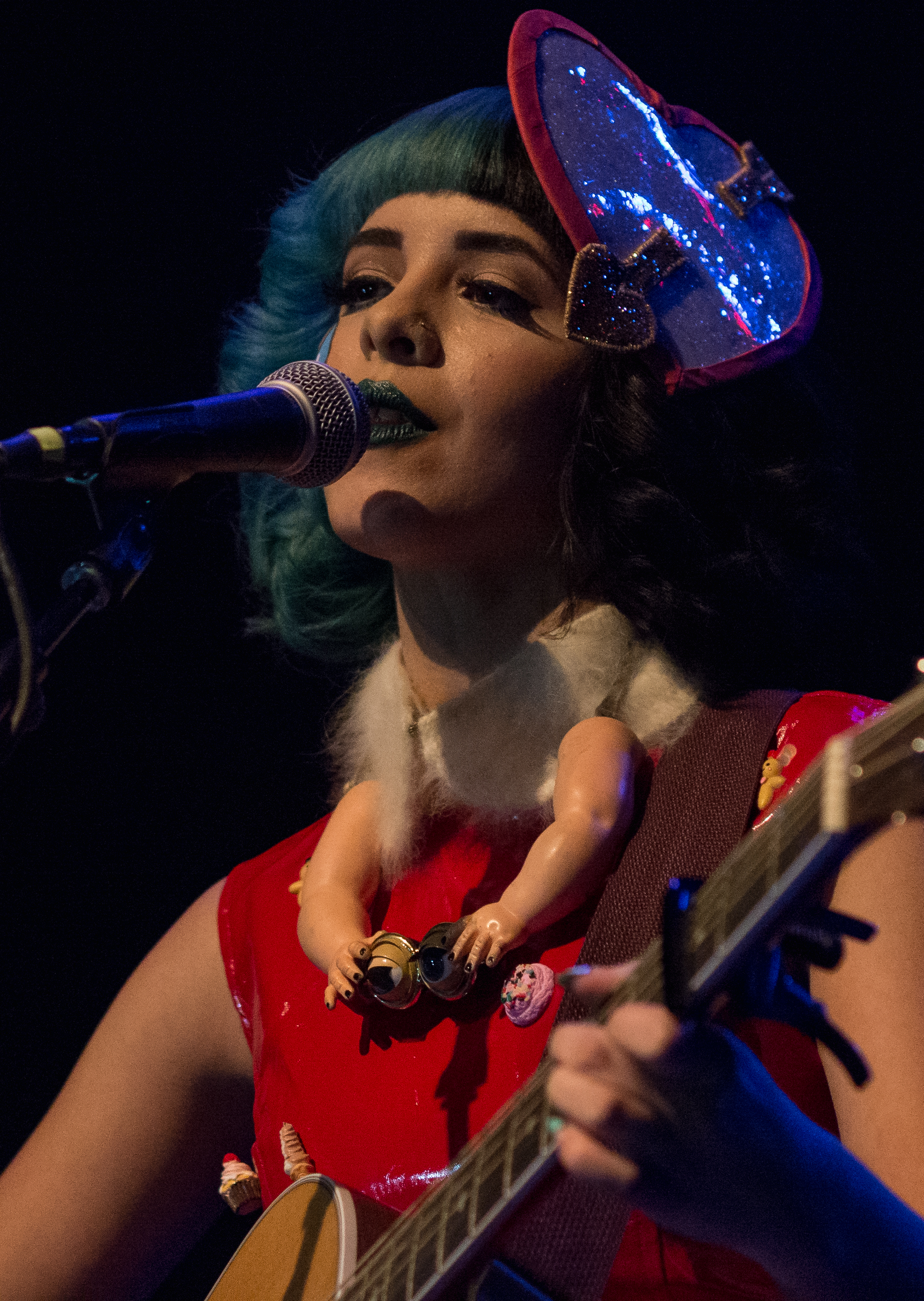
Melanie Martinez in February 2014.

The stateside Puerto Rican community has usually been characterized as being largely poor and part of the urban underclass in the United States. Studies and reports over the last fifty years or so have documented the high poverty status of this community. The picture at the start of the 21st century also reveals significant socioeconomic progress and a community with a growing economic clout. Middle-class neighborhoods predominately populated by Puerto Ricans are mostly found throughout Central Florida, including Orlando, Tampa and their suburbs. Significant numbers of middle-class Puerto Ricans can also be found in the Philadelphia metropolitan area, in upper North Philadelphia, particularly around the Olney-Juniata-Lawncrest area and in Camden County, New Jersey outside the city of Camden, and in the New York City metropolitan area, particularly in the eastern portion of the Bronx and Westchester County, as well as many suburbs of Miami and Boston and throughout New Jersey and southern New England. Smaller, more scattered numbers of well-off Puerto Ricans can be seen throughout the United States, in both traditional Puerto Rican settlements in the Northeast and Midwest, and in progressive sunbelt cities of the South and West.

==== The Hispanic market and remittances to Puerto Rico ====
The combined income for stateside Puerto Ricans is a significant share of the large and growing Hispanic market in the United States and has been attracting increased attention from the media and the corporate sector. In the last decade or so, major corporations have discovered the so-called "urban markets" of blacks and Hispanics that had been neglected for so long. This has spawned a cottage industry of marketing firms, consultants and publications that specialize in the Hispanic market.

One important question this raises is the degree to which stateside Puerto Ricans contribute economically to Puerto Rico. The Puerto Rico Planning Board estimated that remittances totaled $66 million in 1963.

The full extent of the stateside Puerto Rican community's contributions to the economy of Puerto Rico is not known, but it is clearly significant. The role of remittances and investments by Hispanic immigrants to their home countries has reached a level that it has received much attention in the last few years, as countries like Mexico develop strategies to better leverage these large sums of money from their diasporas in their economic development planning.

The income disparity between the stateside community and those living on the island is not as great as those of other Latin-American countries, and the direct connection between second-generation Puerto Ricans and their relatives is not as conducive to direct monetary support. Many Puerto Ricans still living in Puerto Rico also remit to family members who are living stateside.

==== Gender ====
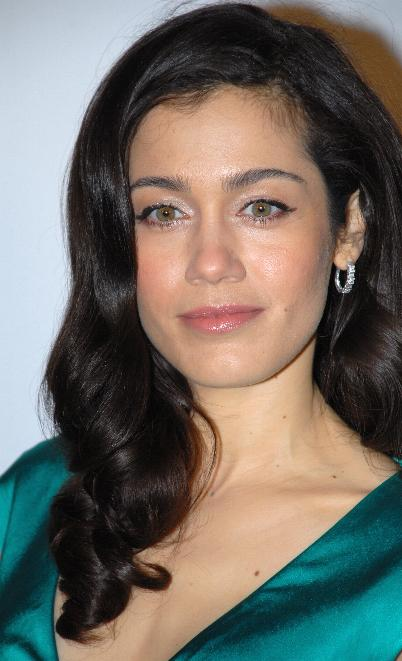
Lymari Nadal actress, film producer and scriptwriter.

The average income in 2002 of stateside Puerto Rican men was $36,572, while women earned an average $30,613, 83.7 percent that of the men. Compared to all Latino groups, whites, and Asians, stateside Puerto Rican women came closer to achieving parity in income to the men of their own racial-ethnic group. In addition, stateside Puerto Rican women had incomes that were 82.3 percent that of white women, while stateside Puerto Rican men had incomes that were 64.0 percent that of white men.

Stateside Puerto Rican women were closer to income parity with white women than were women who were Dominicans (58.7 percent), Central and South Americans (68.4 percent), and below Cubans (86.2 percent), other Hispanics (87.2 percent), blacks (83.7 percent) and Asians (107.7 percent).

Stateside Puerto Rican men were in a weaker position in comparison with men from other racial-ethnic groups. They were closer to income parity to white men than men who were Dominicans (62.3 percent) and Central and South Americans (58.3 percent). Stateside Puerto Ricans were very close to income parity with blacks (65.5 percent), and below Mexicans (68.3 percent), Cubans (75.9 percent), other Latinos (75.1 percent) and Asians (100.7 percent).

=== Educational attainment ===
Stateside Puerto Ricans, along with other US Latinos, have experienced the long-term problem of a high school dropout rate that has resulted in relatively low educational attainment.

According to the Pew Hispanic Center, in Puerto Rico more than 20% of Latinos have a bachelor's degree, and 16% of stateside Puerto Ricans did as of March 2012.

=== Social issues ===
According to U.S. census figures, the Puerto Rican population has one of the highest poverty and incarceration rates among all ethnic groups in the United States. The Puerto Rican community is also one of the most segregated ethnic groups in the country. The stateside Puerto Rican community has partnered with the African American community, particularly in cities such as New York and Philadelphia to combat racism and disenfranchisement of the mid to late 20th century in their communities as a unified force. Though often perceived as largely poor, there is evidence of growing economic clout, as stated earlier.

== Political participation ==
Puerto Rican Democratic members of the United States Congress Luis Gutiérrez (left), José Enrique Serrano (center) and Nydia Velázquez speaking at the 2004 Encuentro Boricua Conference at Hostos Community College in New York City.

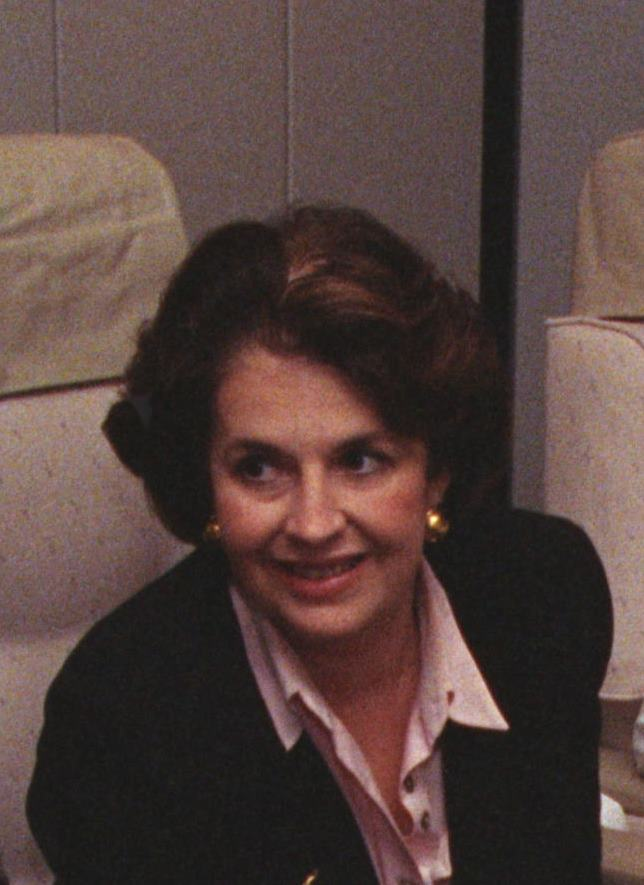
Aida Álvarez, the first Latina woman to hold a United States Cabinet-level position.

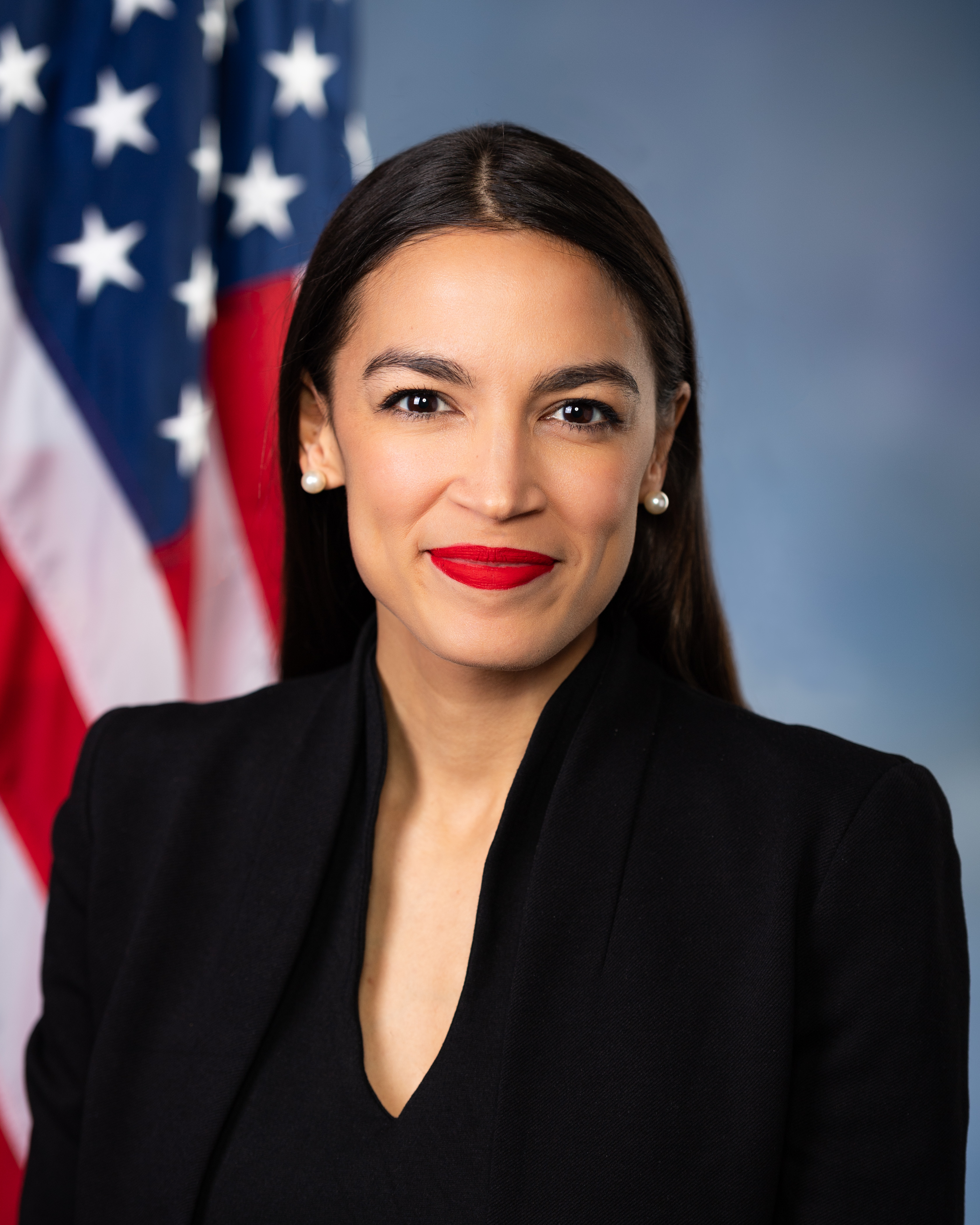
U.S. Representative Alexandria Ocasio-Cortez, also known as AOC, representing parts of The Bronx and Queens, became at age 29 the youngest woman ever to be elected to Congress in November 2018.

The Puerto Rican community has organized itself to represent its interests in stateside political institutions for close to a century. In New York City, Puerto Ricans first began running for public office in the 1920s. In 1937, they elected their first government representative, Oscar Garcia Rivera, to the New York State Assembly. In Massachusetts, Puerto Rican Nelson Merced became the first Latino elected to the Massachusetts House of Representatives, and the first Latino to hold statewide office in the commonwealth.

There are three Puerto Rican members of the United States House of Representatives: Democrats Alexandria Ocasio-Cortez of New York, Ritchie Torres of New York and Nydia Velázquez of New York, complementing the one Resident Commissioner elected to that body from Puerto Rico. Puerto Ricans have also been elected as mayors in three major cities: Miami, Hartford and Camden. Luis A. Quintana, born in Añasco, Puerto Rico, was sworn in as the first Latino mayor of Newark, New Jersey in November 2013, assuming the unexpired term of Cory Booker, who vacated the position to become a U.S. Senator from New Jersey.

On June 26, 2018, Alexandria Ocasio-Cortez, a Puerto Rican millennial, won the Democratic primary in New York's 14th congressional district covering parts of The Bronx and Queens in New York City, defeating the incumbent, Democratic Caucus Chair Joe Crowley, in what has been described as the biggest upset victory in the 2018 midterm election season. Ocasio-Cortez is a member of the Democratic Socialists of America and has been endorsed by various politically progressive organizations and individuals. She is the youngest woman ever elected to Congress.

There are various ways in which stateside Puerto Ricans have exercised their influence. These include protests, campaign contributions and lobbying and voting. Compared to the United States, voter participation by Puerto Ricans in Puerto Rico is very large. Many believe there is a paradox in that this high level of voting is not echoed stateside. There, Puerto Ricans have had persistently low voter registration and turnout rates, despite the relative success they have had in electing community members to significant public offices throughout the United States.

To address this problem, the government of Puerto Rico has, since the late 1980s, launched two major voter registration campaigns to increase the level of voter participation of stateside Puerto Rican. While Puerto Ricans have traditionally been concentrated in the Northeast, coordinated Latino voter registration organizations such as the Southwest Voter Registration Education Project and the United States Hispanic Leadership Institute (based in the Midwest), have not concentrated in this region and have focused on the Mexican-American voter. The government of Puerto Rico has sought to fill this vacuum to insure that stateside Puerto Rican interests are well represented in the electoral process, recognizing that the increased political influence of stateside Puerto Ricans also benefits the island.

This low level of electoral participation is in sharp contrast with voting levels in Puerto Rico, which are much higher than that not only of this community, but also the United States as a whole.

Voter participation has historically been higher in Puerto Rico itself than among Stateside Puerto Ricans. The reasons for the differences in Puerto Rican voter participation have been an object of much discussion, but relatively little scholarly research. An estimated 58% of Stateside Puerto Ricans support the Democratic party and say they think the party represents them well, while 36% think that way of the Republican party.

=== Voter statistics ===
Citizen voting age population breakdown of Latinos by voting registration stage in 2000.

When the relationship of various factors to the turnout rates of stateside Puerto Ricans in 2000 is examined, socioeconomic status emerges as a clear factor. For example, according to the Census:

- Income: the turnout rate for those with incomes less than $10,000 was 37.7 percent, while for those earning $75,000 and above, it was 76.7 percent.
- Employment: 36.5 percent of the unemployed voted, versus 51.2 percent for the employed. The rate for those outside of the labor force was 50.6 percent, probably reflecting the disproportionate role of the elderly, who generally have higher turnout rates.
- Union membership: for union members it was 51.3 percent, while for nonunion members it was 42.6 percent.
- Housing: for homeowners it was 64.0 percent, while it was 41.8 percent for renters.

There were a number of other socio-demographic characteristics where turnout differences also existed, such as:

- Age: the average age of voters was 45.3 years, compared to 38.5 years for eligible nonvoters.
- Education: those without a high school diploma had a turnout rate of 42.5 percent, while for those with a graduate degree, it was 81.0 percent.
- Birthplace: for those born stateside it was 48.9 percent, compared to 52.0 percent for those born in Puerto Rico.
- Marriage status: for those who were married it was 62.0 percent, while those who were never married managed 33.0 percent.
- Military service: for those who ever served in the US military, the turnout rate was 72.1 percent, compared to 48.6 percent for those who never served.

== See also ==
- Cultural diversity in Puerto Rico
  - Corsican immigration to Puerto Rico
  - French immigration to Puerto Rico
  - Crypto-Judaism
  - German immigration to Puerto Rico
  - Irish immigration to Puerto Rico
  - Royal Decree of Graces of 1815
- Demographics of Puerto Rico
- 51st state
- History of women in Puerto Rico
- History of Puerto Rico
- Hispanic and Latino Americans
  - Hispanics and Latinos in New Jersey
- List of Puerto Ricans
- List of Stateside Puerto Rican communities
- Puerto Rican cuisine
  - Piragua
- Puerto Rican culture
- Puerto Rican migration to Hawaii
- Puerto Ricans
- Military history of Puerto Rico
- National Register of Historic Places listings in Puerto Rico
- Nuyorican
  - Nuyorican movement
  - Nuyorican Poets Café
- Outline of Puerto Rico
- Puerto Rican citizenship
- Teatro Puerto Rico
- Young Lords

== Bibliography ==
- Acosta-Belén, Edna, et al. (2000). "Adíos, Borinquen Querida": The Puerto Rican Diaspora, Its History, and Contributions (Albany, NY: Center for Latino, Latin American and Caribbean Studies, State University of New York at Albany).
- Acosta-Belén, Edna, and Carlos E. Santiago (eds.) (2006). Puerto Ricans in the United States: A Contemporary Portrait (Boulder: Lynne Rienner Publishers).
- Baker, Susan S. (2002). Understanding Mainland Puerto Rican Poverty (Philadelphia: Temple University Press).
- Bell, Christopher (2003). Images of America: East Harlem (Portsmouth, NH: Arcadia).
- Bendixen & Associates (2002). Baseline Study on Mainland Puerto Rican Attitudes Toward Civic Involvement and Voting (Report prepared for the Puerto Rico Federal Affairs Administration, March–May).
- Bourgois, Philippe. In Search of Respect: Selling Crack in El Barrio. New York: Cambridge University Press. 2003
- Braschi, Giannina (1994). Empire of Dreams. New Haven: Yale University Press.
- Braschi, Giannina (1998). Yo-Yo Boing! Pittsburgh: Latin American Literary Review Press.
- Briggs, Laura (2002). Reproducing Empire (Berkeley: University of California Press).
- Camara-Fuertes, Luis Raúl (2004). The Phenomenon of Puerto Rican Voting (Gainesville: University Press of Florida).
- Cayo-Sexton, Patricia. 1965. Spanish Harlem: An Anatomy of Poverty. New York: Harper and Row
- Centro de Estudios Puertorriqueños (2003), Special Issue: "Puerto Rican Politics in the United States," Centro Journal, Vol. XV, No. 1 (Spring).
- Census Bureau (2001). The Hispanic Population (Census 2000 Brief) (Washington, DC: U.S. Bureau of the Census, May).
- Census Bureau (2003). 2003 Annual Social and Economic (ASEC) Supplement: Current Population Survey, prepared by the Bureau of the Census for the Bureau of Labor Statistics (Washington, D.C.: U.S. Bureau of the Census).
- Census Bureau (2004a). Global Population Profile: 2002 (Washington, D.C.: International Programs Center [IPC], Population Division, U.S. Bureau of the Census) (PASA HRN-P-00-97-00016-00).
- Census Bureau (2004b). Ancestry: 2000 (Census 2000 Brief) (Washington, D.C.: U.S. Bureau of the Census).
- Chenault, Lawrence R. (1938). The Puerto Rican Migrant in New York City: A Study of Anomie (New York: Columbia University Press).
- Constantine, Consuela (1992). "Political Economy of Puerto Rico, New York". The Economist. Vol. 28.
- Cortés, Carlos (ed.)(1980). Regional Perspectives on the Puerto Rican Experience (New York: Arno Press).
- Cruz Báez, Ángel David, and Thomas D. Boswell (1997). Atlas Puerto Rico (Miami: Cuban American National Council).
- Christenson, Matthew (2003). Evaluating Components of International Migration: Migration Between Puerto Rico and the United States (Working Paper #64, Population Division, U.S. Bureau of the Census).
- Del Torre, Patricia (2012). "Los grandes protagonistas de Puerto Rico: Caras 2012, Editorial Televisa Publishing International: Special edition on Jennifer Lopez, Calle 13, Giannina Braschi, Ricky Martin, et al.
- Cordasco, Francesco and Eugene Bucchioni (1975). The Puerto Rican Experience: A Sociological Sourcebook (Totowa, NJ: Littlefied, Adams & Co.).
- Dávila, Arlene (2004). Barrio Dreams: Puerto Ricans, Latinos, and the Neoliberal City (Berkeley: University of California Press).
- De Genova, Nicholas and Ana Y. Ramos-Zayas (2003). Latino Crossings: Mexicans, Puerto Ricans, and the Politics of Race and Citizenship (New York: Routledge).
- de la Garza, Rodolfo O., and Louis DeSipio (eds) (2004). Muted Voices: Latinos and the 2000 Elections (Lanham: Rowman & Littlefield Publishers, Inc.).
- DeSipio, Louis, and Adrian D. Pantoja (2004). "Puerto Rican Exceptionalism? A Comparative Analysis of Puerto Rican, Mexican, Salvadoran and Dominican Transnational Civic and Political Ties" (Paper delivered at The Project for Equity Representation and Governance Conference entitled "Latino Politics: The State of the Discipline," Bush Presidential Conference Center, Texas A&M University in College Station, TX, April 30 – May 1, 2004)
- DeSipio, Louis, Harry Pachon, Rodolfo de la Garza, and Jongho Lee (2003). Immigrant Politics at Home and Abroad: How Latino Immigrants Engage the Politics of Their Home Communities and the United States (Los Angeles: Tomás Rivera Policy Institute)
- Dolan, Jay P., ed. Puerto Rican and Cuban Catholics in the U.S., 1900-1965 (Volume 2, "Notre Dame History of Hispanic Catholics in the U.S." series), (University of Notre Dame Press, 1994).
- Duany, Jorge (2002). The Puerto Rican Nation on the Move: Identities on the Island and in the United States (Chapel Hill: University of North Carolina Press).
- Falcón, Angelo (2004). Atlas of Stateside Puerto Ricans (Washington, DC: Puerto Rico Federal Affairs Administration).
- Puerto Ricans: Thirty Years of Progress & Struggle, Puerto Rican Heritage Month 2006 Calendar Journal (New York: Comite Noviembre). (2006).
- Fears, Darry (2004). "Political Map in Florida Is Changing: Puerto Ricans Affect Latino Vote," Washington Post (Sunday, July 11, 2004): A1.
- Fitzpatrick, Joseph P. (1996). The Stranger Is Our Own: Reflections on the Journey of Puerto Rican Migrants (Kansas City: Sheed & Ward).
- Gottmann, Jean (1957). "Megalopolis or the Urbanization of the Northeastern Seaboard," Economic Geography, Vol. 33, No. 3 (July): 189–200.
- Grosfoguel, Ramón (2003). Colonial Subjects: Puerto Ricans in a Global Perspective (Berkeley: University of California Press).
- Haslip-Viera, Gabriel, Angelo Falcón, and Felix Matos-Rodríguez (eds) (2004). Boricuas in Gotham: Puerto Ricans in the Making of Modern New York City, 1945–2000 (Princeton: Marcus Weiner Publishers).
- Heine, Jorge (ed.) (1983). Time for Decision: The United States and Puerto Rico (Lanham, MD: The North-South Publishing Co.).
- Hernández, Carmen Dolores (1997). Puerto Rican Voices in English: Interviews with Writers (Westport, CT: Praeger).
- Jennings, James, and Monte Rivera (eds) (1984). Puerto Rican Politics in Urban America (Westport: Greenwood Press).
- Lapp, Michael (1990). Managing Migration: The Migration Division of Puerto Rico and Puerto Ricans in New York City, 1948–1968 (Doctoral Dissertation: Johns Hopkins University).
- Maldonado, A.W. (1997). Teodoro Moscoso and Puerto Rico's Operation Bootstrap (Gainesville: University Press of Florida).
- Mencher, Joan. 1989. Growing Up in Eastville, a Barrio of New York. New York: Columbia University Press.
- Meyer, Gerald. (1989). Vito Marcantonio: Radical Politician 1902–1954 (Albany: State University of New York Press).
- Mills, C. Wright, Clarence Senior, and Rose Kohn Goldsen (1950). The Puerto Rican Journey: New York's Newest Migrants (New York: Harper & Brothers).
- Moreno Vega, Marta (2004). When the Spirits Dance Mambo: Growing Up Nuyorican in El Barrio (New York: Three Rivers Press).
- Nathan, Debbie (2004). "Adios, Nueva York," City Limits (September/October 2004).
- Negrón-Muntaner, Frances (2004). Boricua Pop: Puerto Ricans and the Latinization of American Culture (New York: New York University Press).
- Negrón-Muntaner, Frances and Ramón Grosfoguel (eds) (1997). Puerto Rican Jam: Essays on Culture and Politics (Minneapolis: University of Minnesota Press).
- Nieto, Sonia (ed.) (2000). Puerto Rican Students in U.S. Schools (Mahwah, NJ: Lawrence Erlbaum Associates).
- Padilla, Elena. 1992. Up From Puerto Rico. New York: Columbia University Press.
- Pérez, Gina M. (2004). The Near Northwest Side Story: Migration, Displacement, & Puerto Rican Families (Berkeley: University of California Press).
- Pérez y González, María (2000). Puerto Ricans in the United States (Westport: Greenwood Press).
- Ramos-Zayas, Ana Y. (2003). National Performances: The Politics of Class, Race, and Space in Puerto Rican Chicago (Chicago: University of Chicago Press).
- Ribes Tovar, Federico (1970). Handbook of the Puerto Rican Community (New York: Plus Ultra Educational Publishers).
- Rivera Ramos. Efrén (2001). The Legal Construction of Identity: The Judicial and Social Legacy of American Colonialism in Puerto Rico (Washington, DC: American Psychological Association).
- Rivera-Batiz, Francisco L., and Carlos E. Santiago (1996). Island Paradox: Puerto Rico in the 1990s (New York: Russell Sage Foundation).
- Rodriguez, Clara E. (1989). Puerto Ricans: Born in the U.S.A. (Boston: Unwin Hyman).
- Rodríguez, Clara E. (2000). Changing Race: Latinos, the Census, and the History of Ethnicity in the United States (New York: New York University Press).
- Rodríguez, Victor M. (2005). Latino Politics in the United States: Race, Ethnicity, Class and Gender in the Mexican American and Puerto Rican Experience (Dubuque, IW: Kendall/Hunt Publishing Company) (Includes a CD)
- Safa, Helen (1990). "The Urban Poor of Puerto Rico: A Study in Development and Inequality". Anthropology Today. 24: 12–91.
- Salas, Leonardo (1990). "From San Juan to New York: The History of the Puerto Rican". America: History and Life. 31.
- Sánchez González, Lisa (2001). Boricua Literature: A Literary History of the Puerto Rican Diaspora (New York: New York University Press).
- Shaw, Wendy (1997). "The Spatial Concentration of Affluence in the United States," The Geographical Review 87 (October): 546–553.
- Torres, Andres. (1995). Between Melting Pot and Mosaic: African Americans and Puerto Ricans in the New York Political Economy (Philadelphia: Temple University Press).
- Torres, Andrés and José E. Velázquez (eds) (1998). The Puerto Rican Movement: Voices from the Diaspora (Philadelphia: Temple University Press).
- Vargas and Vatajs -Ramos, Carlos. (2006). Settlement Patterns and Residential Segregation of Puerto Ricans in the United States, Policy Report, Vol. 1, No. 2 (New York: Centro de Estudios Puertorriqueños, Hunter College, Fall).
- Wakefield, Dan. Island in the City: The World of Spanish Harlem. New York: Houghton Mifflin. 1971. Ch. 2. pp. 42–60.
- Whalen, Carmen Teresa (2001). From Puerto Rico to Philadelphia: Puerto Rican Workers and Postwar Economics (Philadelphia: Temple University Press).
- Whalen, Carmen Teresa, and Víctor Vázquez-Hernández (eds.) (2006). The Puerto Rican Diaspora: Historical Perspectives (Philadelphia: Temple University Press).
