= Anthony Pugliese =

Anthony V. Pugliese III
- Occupations: Entrepreneur and businessman
- Employer: The Pugliese Company
- Known for: Destiny, FL and Pop Culture Collection
- Website: www.anthonyvpugliese.com

Anthony V. Pugliese III is an American real estate developer and pop culture collector. He is the chairman and founder of The Pugliese Company, a real estate and business development company. The Pugliese Company is known best for its proposed development of Destiny, a 61-square-mile eco-sustainable city spanning 41,000 acres that was named one of the 16 founding projects of the Climate Positive Development program by the Clinton Climate Initiative. Pugliese is also known for his pop culture collectibles that have included the James Bond 007 Aston Martin DB5, the hat of the Wicked Witch of the West from the Wizard of Oz, and the Colt revolver that Jack Ruby used to kill Lee Harvey Oswald.

== Early life and business activities ==
Since the 1970s, Pugliese and The Pugliese Company have designed condos, office buildings, and self-storage units. The first of four children, Pugliese wanted to be an actor when he entered Arts High School in Newark, N.J. When the school dropped its drama class, Pugliese studied art and design instead. Lacking money for college, Anthony teamed up with his father to start a swimming-pool business. By age 21, Pugliese had designed a pool that incorporated natural landscaping elements and looked more like a lake than a swimming pool, creating the Pugliese Natural Look Pool. The success of his family business allowed Pugliese to move into real estate, purchasing undervalued properties in New Jersey, and eventually Florida. Throughout the years Pugliese has won numerous awards for his commercial developments such as the Crystal Corporate Center in Boca Raton, and the development of the Pineapple Grove district in Delray Beach, Florida. Pugliese has also expanded his business forays into the world of art, motion picture cinema, and technology. In 1993 Anthony founded Safe & Secure Self Storage which provides self-storage services to Bergen County, New Jersey. Shortly after founding Safe & Secure Self Storage, Anthony founded Automated Self Storage, which focused on the robotic automation of the self-storage industry.

== Pop culture collection ==
One of Anthony V. Pugliese III's most prized possessions in his pop culture collection is the gun that Jack Ruby used to assassinate Lee Harvey Oswald. Pugliese bought the Colt Cobra .38 at auction in 1991 for $220,000, after the Ruby family won the rights to the gun following a 20-year legal battle.

Although Pugliese remains a top pop culture and political memorabilia collector, he did auction off a sizable amount of his collection to raise funds for his 41,000 acre eco-sustainable community, Destiny. Items that were sold at auction as part of Pugliese's Pop Culture Collection included:

- The witch's hat worn by Margaret Hamilton in The Wizard of Oz during the sequence in which Dorothy splashes her with water and she cries out: "I'm melting!" ($170,000)
- The tailcoat worn by Orson Welles in Citizen Kane with a K embroidered on each cuff ($27,000)
- Christopher Reeve's Superman costumes ($45,000)
- The steel-reinforced black felt hat that Oddjob used as a deadly weapon in the James Bond film Goldfinger ($110,000)
- Several canes carried by Charlie Chaplin ($4,200 and upwards)
- Harrison Ford's bullwhip in Indiana Jones ($57,500)
- The Colt revolver used by Jack Ruby to shoot Lee Harvey Oswald following the JFK Assassination.

== Destiny, Florida ==
Destiny, Florida, was a proposed large scale eco-sustainable community designed as a biotechnology hub located in Osceola County near Yeehaw Junction, Florida. The proposed new city development encompassed more than 61 square miles, spanning more than 41,000 acres, making this acquisition by Pugliese the largest acquisition of land in Central Florida since Walt Disney acquired the land that would become Walt Disney World. After starting the Destiny project Pugliese eventually brought on FD Destiny LLC, owned by Fred DeLuca, co-founder of Subway, as a co-investor in the project. It was one of 16 initial projects of "climate positive" real estate developments supported by the Clinton Climate Initiative. In 2010, the project was delayed due to lawsuits and opposition from Florida state agencies. The Destiny land deal eventually fell apart, resulting in a contentious lawsuit and eventual trial against Anthony V. Pugliese III. In 2012 charges were filed against Pugliese for creating fake companies and using phony billings to steal from Frederick DeLuca. Pugliese was eventually found guilty and sentenced to 6 months in jail along with 10 years of probation. His business manager Joseph Reamer pleaded no contest and was sentenced to a four-year probation term. In January 2018, a Palm Beach Circuit Judge ordered Pugliese to pay $23 million to the estate of former business partner Frederick DeLuca.

== Charitable activities ==
Anthony V. Pugliese III has contributed to both local and national based charities. In 2010, he donated $150,000 to create a Little League baseball field for disabled children in Delray Beach. He named the field in honor of his grandson, Anthony V. Pugliese V. Pugliese has also been known to use his pop culture memorabilia to generate donations to charity including using bullets fired from the gun Jack Ruby used to kill Lee Harvey Oswald to raise money for various charities such as the National Audubon Society and other environmental groups.
