= List of Stateside Puerto Rican communities =

This is a list of communities known for possessing a large number of Stateside Puerto Ricans. Over 38 percent of Stateside Puerto Ricans live in just two states, namely Florida and New York, although large numbers can also be found in the states of New Jersey, Pennsylvania, Massachusetts, and Connecticut. There are many states with smaller but fast-growing Puerto Rican populations including Rhode Island in the Northeast, Virginia, North Carolina, Georgia, and Texas down south, Ohio, Illinois, and Wisconsin in the Midwest, and California and Hawaii out west.

== Lists ==
=== Communities with the largest Puerto Rican populations ===
The top 50 U.S. communities with the largest populations of Puerto Ricans (Source: Census 2020)

1. New York City, NY – 595,627
2. Philadelphia, PA – 127,114
3. Chicago, IL – 93,193
4. Springfield, MA – 58,994
5. Orlando, FL – 41,105
6. Hartford, CT – 37,751
7. Cleveland, OH – 34,127
8. Allentown, PA – 33,531
9. Newark, NJ – 33,171
10. Jacksonville, FL – 33,137
11. Rochester, NY – 32,437
12. Reading, PA – 29,732
13. Bridgeport, CT – 28,855
14. Waterbury, CT – 28,840
15. Milwaukee, WI – 28,518
16. Boston, MA – 27,985
17. Buffalo, NY – 27,895
18. Poinciana, FL – 27,092
19. Tampa, FL – 26,355
20. Worcester, MA – 25,880
21. Kissimmee, FL – 25,572
22. New Britain, CT – 24,978
23. Deltona, FL – 23,073
24. Jersey City, NJ – 21,600
25. New Haven, CT – 21,067
26. Camden, NJ – 20,798
27. Yonkers, NY – 20,183
28. San Antonio, TX – 19,906
29. Los Angeles, CA – 18,323
30. Alafaya, FL – 18,076
31. Holyoke, MA – 17,526
32. St. Cloud, FL – 17,450
33. Vineland, NJ – 17,769
34. Paterson, NJ – 16,347
35. Lancaster, PA – 15,474
36. Bethlehem, PA – 14,775
37. Meriden, CT – 14,543
38. Lorain, OH – 14,274
39. Houston, TX – 13,836
40. Lawrence, MA – 13,764
41. Killeen, TX – 13,512
42. Providence, RI – 13,367
43. Port St. Lucie, FL – 13,219
44. Buenaventura Lakes, FL – 12,781
45. Miami, FL – 12,336
46. Fort Worth, TX – 12,295
47. Meadow Woods, FL – 12,196
48. Charlotte, NC – 12,088
49. Virginia Beach, VA – 11,383
50. Elizabeth, NJ – 11,365

The 25 counties with the largest Puerto Rican populations, include (2020 Census):

1. Bronx County, NY – 237,047
2. Orange County, FL – 191,992
3. Kings County, NY – 140,029
4. Cook County, IL – 133,042
5. Philadelphia County, PA – 127,114
6. Hillsborough County, FL – 118,284
7. Osceola County, FL – 116,069
8. Hartford County, CT – 107,485
9. Hampden County, MA – 97,870
10. New Haven County, CT – 91,342
11. New York County, NY – 91,274
12. Queens County, NY – 89,115
13. Miami-Dade County, FL – 83,557
14. Broward County, FL – 82,665
15. Polk County, FL – 82,409
16. Suffolk County, NY – 60,236
17. Worcester County, MA – 57,223
18. Essex County, NJ – 55,091
19. Fairfield County, CT – 52,121
20. Monroe County, NY – 49,905
21. Cuyahoga County, OH – 49,882
22. Hudson County, NJ – 49,853
23. Los Angeles County, CA – 48,045
24. Lehigh County, PA – 47,496
25. Palm Beach County, FL – 47,383

=== Communities with highest percentages of Puerto Ricans ===
The top 50 US communities (over 5,000 in population) with the highest percentages of Puerto Ricans as a percent of total population (Source: Census 2020)

1. Holyoke, MA – 45.8%
2. Buenaventura Lakes, FL – 42.2%
3. Poinciana, FL – 39.0%
4. Springfield, MA – 37.8%
5. Azalea Park, FL – 34.8%
6. New Britain, CT – 33.6%
7. Lebanon, PA – 32.3%
8. Kissimmee, FL – 32.2%
9. Willimantic, CT – 31.4%
10. Reading, PA – 31.2%
11. Hartford, CT – 31.1%
12. Southbridge, MA – 30.4%
13. Dunkirk, NY – 30.1%
14. St. Cloud, FL – 29.5%
15. Camden, NJ – 28.9%
16. Meadow Woods, FL – 27.8%
17. Vineland, NJ – 27.5%
18. Lancaster, PA – 26.6%
19. Union Park, FL – 26.7%
20. Allentown, PA – 26.6%
21. Amsterdam, NY – 26.2%
22. Waterbury, CT – 25.2%
23. Deltona, FL – 24.6%
24. Meriden, CT – 23.9%
25. York, PA – 23.1%
26. Lorain, OH – 21.8%
27. Pine Castle, FL – 21.6%
28. Haines City, FL – 21.0%
29. East Hartford, CT – 20.8%
30. Sky Lake, FL – 19.7%
31. Alafaya, FL – 19.5%
32. Bethlehem, PA – 19.4%
33. Bridgeport, CT – 19.4%
34. Chicopee, MA – 19.3%
35. Southchase, FL – 18.9%
36. Fitchburg, MA – 18.5%
37. Campbell, OH – 17.9%
38. Wedgefield, FL – 16.3%
39. Four Corners, FL – 16.2%
40. Bronx (NYC borough), NY – 16.1%
41. Orange City, FL – 15.9%
42. New London, CT – 15.8%
43. New Haven, CT – 15.7%
44. Perth Amboy, NJ – 15.7%
45. Lawrence, MA – 15.4%
46. Rochester, NY – 15.3%
47. Oak Ridge, FL – 14.9%
48. Palm River-Clair Mel, FL – 14.7%
49. Harrisburg, PA – 14.2%
50. Central Falls, RI – 13.8%

The 25 large cities (over 200,000 in population) with the highest percentages of Puerto Rican residents in relation to total population, include (2020 Census):

1. Rochester, NY – 15.3%
2. Orlando, FL – 13.3%
3. Worcester, MA – 12.5%
4. Newark, NJ – 10.6%
5. Buffalo, NY – 10.0%
6. Yonkers, NY – 9.5%
7. Cleveland, OH – 9.1%
8. Philadelphia, PA – 7.9%
9. Jersey City, NJ – 7.2%
10. Tampa, FL – 6.8%
11. New York City, NY – 6.7%
12. Port St. Lucie, FL – 6.4%
13. Milwaukee, WI – 4.9%
14. Fayetteville, NC – 4.4%
15. Boston, MA – 4.1%
16. Jacksonville, FL – 3.4%
17. Chicago, IL – 3.3%
18. Miami, FL – 2.7%
19. St. Petersburg, FL – 2.5%
20. Virginia Beach, VA – 2.4%
21. Norfolk, VA – 2.1%
22. Columbus, GA – 2.0%
23. Chesapeake, VA – 1.8%
24. Hialeah, FL – 1.7%
25. Honolulu, HI – 1.6%

The 25 large cities (over 200,000 in population and over 5% Hispanic/Latino) where Puerto Ricans make up the highest percentages of the Hispanic/Latino population, include (2020 Census):

1. Buffalo, NY – 78%
2. Rochester, NY – 77%
3. Cleveland, OH – 70%
4. Worcester, MA – 54%
5. Philadelphia, PA – 53%
6. Orlando, FL – 40%
7. Fayetteville, NC – 34%
8. Columbus, GA – 31%
9. Jacksonville, FL – 30%
10. Newark, NJ – 29%
11. Jersey City, NJ – 29%
12. Port St. Lucie, FL – 29%
13. Honolulu, HI – 29%
14. Virginia Beach, VA – 28%
15. Yonkers, NY – 27%
16. St. Petersburg, FL – 27%
17. Tampa, FL – 26%
18. Chesapeake, VA – 26%
19. Milwaukee, WI – 24%
20. New York City, NY – 23%
21. Norfolk, VA – 22%
22. Boston, MA – 21%
23. Columbus, OH – 17%
24. Detroit, MI – 13%
25. Atlanta, GA – 12%

=== Metropolitan areas with largest Puerto Rican populations ===
The following metropolitan areas have Puerto Rican populations of over 10,000 (Source: 2020 ACS 5-Year Estimates):

1. New York City-North Jersey, NY-NJ-PA metropolitan area - 1,173,031 (6.1% Puerto Rican)
2. Orlando, FL metropolitan area - 386,706 (15.1% Puerto Rican)
3. Philadelphia, PA-NJ-DE metropolitan area - 278,515 (4.6% Puerto Rican)
4. Miami, FL metropolitan area - 225,998 (3.7% Puerto Rican)
5. Chicago, IL-IN-WI metropolitan area - 207,526 (2.2% Puerto Rican)
6. Tampa-St. Petersburg, FL metropolitan area - 201,587 (6.4% Puerto Rican)
7. Boston, MA-NH metropolitan area - 136,015 (2.8% Puerto Rican)
8. Hartford, CT metropolitan area - 120,494 (10.0% Puerto Rican)
9. Springfield, MA metropolitan area - 105,545 (15.1% Puerto Rican)
10. New Haven, CT metropolitan area - 90,996 (10.6% Puerto Rican)
11. Allentown, PA metropolitan area - 77,333 (9.2% Puerto Rican)
12. Washington, DC-MD-VA metropolitan area - 73,119 (1.2% Puerto Rican)
13. Cleveland, OH metropolitan area - 71,778 (3.5% Puerto Rican)
14. Providence, RI-MA metropolitan area - 70,473 (4.3% Puerto Rican)
15. Lakeland–Winter Haven, FL metropolitan area - 68,564 (9.7% Puerto Rican)
16. Worcester, MA metropolitan area - 65,799 (7.0% Puerto Rican)
17. Atlanta, GA metropolitan area - 64,905 (1.1% Puerto Rican)
18. Los Angeles, CA metropolitan area - 61,427 (0.5% Puerto Rican)
19. Dallas–Fort Worth, TX metropolitan area - 57,840 (0.8% Puerto Rican)
20. Bridgeport, CT metropolitan area - 53,574 (5.7% Puerto Rican)
21. Rochester, NY metropolitan area - 53,294 (5.0% Puerto Rican)
22. Houston, TX metropolitan area - 50,066 (0.7% Puerto Rican)
23. Reading, PA metropolitan area - 45,432 (10.8% Puerto Rican)
24. Jacksonville, FL metropolitan area - 43,813 (2.9% Puerto Rican)
25. Deltona-Daytona Beach, FL metropolitan area - 43,114 (6.5% Puerto Rican)
26. Milwaukee, WI metropolitan area - 39,279 (2.5% Puerto Rican)
27. Buffalo, NY metropolitan area - 37,934 (3.4% Puerto Rican)
28. Riverside-San Bernardino, CA metropolitan area - 37,048 (0.7% Puerto Rican)
29. Lancaster, PA metropolitan area - 36,788 (6.8% Puerto Rican)
30. Phoenix, AZ metropolitan area - 36,353 (0.7% Puerto Rican)
31. Cape Coral-Fort Myers, FL metropolitan area - 33,998 (4.5% Puerto Rican)
32. Virginia Beach-Norfolk, VA-NC metropolitan area - 33,961 (1.9% Puerto Rican)
33. San Antonio, TX metropolitan area - 32,964 (1.3% Puerto Rican)
34. Honolulu, HI metropolitan area - 32,568 (3.3% Puerto Rican)
35. San Francisco–Oakland, CA metropolitan area - 32,021 (0.7% Puerto Rican)
36. Baltimore, MD metropolitan area - 28,301 (1.0% Puerto Rican)
37. Vineland, NJ metropolitan area - 26,287 (17.5% Puerto Rican)
38. San Diego, CA metropolitan area - 25,121 (0.8% Puerto Rican)
39. Charlotte, NC-SC metropolitan area - 24,975 (1.0% Puerto Rican)
40. Las Vegas, NV metropolitan area - 24,330 (1.1% Puerto Rican)
41. Detroit, MI metropolitan area - 24,153 (0.6% Puerto Rican)
42. Port St. Lucie, FL metropolitan area - 23,785 (4.9% Puerto Rican)
43. Seattle, WA metropolitan area - 22,967 (0.6% Puerto Rican)
44. Ocala, FL metropolitan area - 22,863 (6.3% Puerto Rican)
45. Palm Bay, FL metropolitan area - 22,148 (3.7% Puerto Rican)
46. Albany-Schenectady, NY metropolitan area - 21,724 (2.5% Puerto Rican)
47. Austin, TX metropolitan area - 20,614 (0.9% Puerto Rican)
48. Killeen, TX metropolitan area - 20,354 (4.5% Puerto Rican)
49. Harrisburg, PA metropolitan area - 20,087 (3.5% Puerto Rican)
50. Scranton-Wilkes Barre, PA metropolitan area - 19,825 (3.6% Puerto Rican)
51. Trenton, NJ metropolitan area - 19,293 (5.2% Puerto Rican)
52. Raleigh-Cary, NC metropolitan area - 19,204 (1.4% Puerto Rican)
53. Fayetteville, NC metropolitan area - 18,589 (3.6% Puerto Rican)
54. Sarasota, FL metropolitan area - 17,222 (2.1% Puerto Rican)
55. Atlantic City, NJ metropolitan area - 17,103 (6.5% Puerto Rican)
56. York, PA metropolitan area - 17,098 (3.8% Puerto Rican)
57. Denver, CO metropolitan area - 16,566 (0.6% Puerto Rican)
58. Sacramento, CA metropolitan area - 16,532 (0.7% Puerto Rican)
59. Columbus, OH metropolitan area - 15,099 (0.7% Puerto Rican)
60. Norwich-New London, CT metropolitan area - 14,458 (5.4% Puerto Rican)
61. Richmond, VA metropolitan area - 13,686 (1.1% Puerto Rican)
62. Lebanon, PA metropolitan area - 13,423 (9.6% Puerto Rican)
63. Syracuse, NY metropolitan area - 12,928 (2.0% Puerto Rican)
64. Youngstown, OH-PA metropolitan area - 12,045 (2.2% Puerto Rican)
65. Minneapolis–St. Paul, MN–WI metropolitan area - 11,981 (0.3% Puerto Rican)
66. Pittsburgh, PA metropolitan area - 10,663 (0.5% Puerto Rican)
67. Nashville, TN metropolitan area - 10,288 (0.5% Puerto Rican)

== Puerto Ricans in the Northeast ==
North Eastern United States

The Northeastern United States is home to 2.58 million Puerto Ricans, comprising 47% of the Stateside Puerto Rican population nationwide. Lower New England and the NY-NJ-PA area hold the majority of the region's Puerto Rican population. Combined, the New England states are home to over 600,000 Puerto Ricans, with the vast majority in the Lower portion of New England, having a very high concentration of Puerto Ricans.

=== New York ===
New York City has the largest population of Puerto Ricans in the country outside Puerto Rico itself. Large numbers of Puerto Ricans live in all five boroughs and the borough of the Bronx has the largest number of Puerto Ricans of any U.S. county. Historically, New York City was the center of the Stateside Puerto Rican community. In New York, Puerto Rican populations are significant in New York City, Long Island, and the Hudson Valley, especially Yonkers and other areas throughout Westchester County, Binghamton, Amsterdam, Kingston, Newburgh, Middletown, Haverstraw, and the Albany-Schenectady-Troy area as well. There are also large Puerto Rican populations in the cities of Utica, Rome, Syracuse, Geneva, Rochester, Buffalo, and Dunkirk in Western New York.

=== Pennsylvania ===
In Pennsylvania, one-quarter of Puerto Ricans reside in Philadelphia. However, Puerto Ricans are more concentrated in South Central Pennsylvania and the Lehigh Valley. This area, extending from Harrisburg to the New Jersey border is home to almost half of Puerto Ricans statewide. Cities along this stretch include York, Harrisburg, Lancaster, Lebanon, Reading, Fullerton, Allentown, Bethlehem, and Easton. There is also a smaller Puerto Rican presence in towns such as Chester, Coatesville, West Chester, Pottstown, Norristown, Bristol, and Levittown, as well as other areas in the Philadelphia metro area.

Though, the bulk of Pennsylvania's Puerto Rican population is in the southeastern section of the state, other areas including the Scranton-Wilkes Barre-Hazleton area and the Poconos in northeastern Pennsylvania, as well as the Pittsburgh area, New Castle, and Erie in western Pennsylvania also have sizeable Puerto Rican populations present.

=== New Jersey ===
In New Jersey, a slight majority of Puerto Ricans are located in North Jersey. Cities with significant populations include Newark, Jersey City, Paterson, Passaic, North Bergen, Union City Bayonne, Perth Amboy, Dover, Carteret, and Elizabeth. The remaining portion is in South Jersey, including cities like Trenton, Camden, Pennsauken, Vineland, Millville, Pleasantville, and Atlantic City.

=== Connecticut ===
Connecticut has the highest concentration of Puerto Ricans of any state by percentage and has large Puerto Rican populations throughout the state, with the largest in Hartford, East Hartford, Bridgeport, New Haven, Meriden, Waterbury, Bristol, Ansonia, Derby, Manchester, New Britain, New London, Windham, Norwich, and Willimantic. Though, half of the Puerto Rican population in the New England area is situated along the Interstate-91 corridor, extending from New Haven in Connecticut to Holyoke in Massachusetts.

=== Massachusetts ===
In Massachusetts, the largest Puerto Rican populations are in Holyoke, Springfield, Chicopee, Southbridge, Fitchburg, Leominster, Worcester, Lowell, Lawrence, Methuen, Haverhill, Lynn, Boston, Chelsea, Brockton, Fall River, Taunton, and New Bedford. The highest percentage of Puerto Ricans in the US proper can be found in Holyoke. Puerto Ricans continue to dominate demographically in the central and western parts of the state. Large portions of the state's Puerto Rican population is in the Boston area.

=== Rhode Island ===
In Rhode Island, there is a large Puerto Rican population, vast majority of which live in Providence County, especially the cities of Providence, Cranston, Pawtucket, Central Falls, and Woonsocket. There are smaller numbers of Puerto Ricans in other parts of the state, like Newport.

== Puerto Ricans in the South ==
Southern United States

The Southern United States is home to 1.98 million Puerto Ricans, comprising 35% of the Puerto Rican population nationwide.

=== Florida ===
Florida is home to two-thirds of the Puerto Rican population in the South. Florida is currently home to the fastest-growing Puerto Rican population of any state. Cubans and Puerto Ricans are Florida's largest Hispanic groups, though unlike the Cuban community which is nearly entirely located in the South Florida and Tampa Bay areas, the Puerto Rican population is far more spread-out and is present in large numbers in Central Florida, South Florida, and North Florida, having large populations in the metro areas of Orlando, Tampa, Miami, and Jacksonville, among other cities. South Florida has a large Puerto Rican population centered around the Miami metro area, yet are largely overlooked by Cuban dominance and the overall diversity of the Miami area, spread out in significant numbers in places like Miami, Homestead, Hialeah, Leisure City, The Hammocks, Miami Beach, Royal Palm Beach, Lake Worth Beach, Deerfield Beach, Hollywood, West Palm Beach, North Miami, Miami Gardens, Pembroke Pines, Tamarac, Miramar, Coral Springs, Davie, Plantation, Margate, Palm Springs, Dania Beach, Pompano Beach, Boynton Beach, Coconut Creek, Fort Lauderdale, and Port St. Lucie. The gulf coast of Florida has significant Puerto Rican populations present in scattered areas, in cities such as, Tampa, Town 'n' Country, Brandon, Riverview, Spring Hill, St. Petersburg, Pinellas Park, Lakeland, Cape Coral, Lehigh Acres, and Fort Myers.

Central Florida has the largest Puerto Rican population of any region in the state and the fastest-growing Puerto Rican population in the country. The Orlando metropolitan area is the center of the Puerto Rican population in Central Florida and there is large populations of Puerto Ricans throughout the region, with the largest populations in Orlando, Kissimmee, Poinciana, Buenaventura Lakes, Azalea Park, Meadow Woods, Pine Hills, Pine Castle, Lakeland, Deltona, St. Cloud, Union Park, Southchase, Four Corners, Casselberry, Clermont, Altamonte Springs, Sanford, Apopka, Alafaya, Oak Ridge, Oviedo, Daytona Beach, and Palm Bay, among other cities in the area. Osceola County is the only county in the country where Puerto Ricans are the largest ancestral group. Puerto Ricans are also the vast majority of Hispanics in Volusia County. The I-4 corridor, extending from Daytona Beach to Tampa, is home to 500,000 Puerto Ricans. The I-4 corridor is politically considered the swing section of the state, yet Puerto Rican growth has created a Democratic registration advantage. Puerto Rican growth in Central Florida has also had a direct impact on the uninterrupted influence Cubans once had. In North Florida, there are significant Puerto Rican populations in Jacksonville, Orange Park, Ocala, Tallahassee, and Gainesville. Though, the most notable growth in North Florida has been in the southern fringes of the region bordering Central Florida (like Ocala for example), as well as the Jacksonville area (especially Clay County). Though, the Puerto Rican population may not be as large as other parts of Florida, especially Central Florida, Puerto Ricans often make up the majority of Hispanics in many North Florida cities, due to lower percentages of Hispanics in North Florida overall.

=== Virginia ===
In Virginia, almost half of the Puerto Rican population is in the many independent cities of the Hampton Roads area, including Newport News, Hampton, Virginia Beach, Norfolk, Chesapeake, Williamsburg, James City County, and York County. In fact, outside Florida, the region stretching from the Hampton Roads metropolitan area of Southeastern Virginia up to the Tri-cities portion of the Richmond metro area has the highest percentage of Puerto Ricans of any metropolitan area or urban region in the Southern United States. Though, Puerto Ricans are largely spread out throughout the Hampton Roads area and most cities range around 2-3% Puerto Rican.

A large chunk of the remainder is mainly in the Richmond-Tri Cities area and the DC suburbs of Northern Virginia. In Richmond area, Puerto Ricans are present in the city of Richmond, the Tri Cities area, Chesterfield County, and Prince George County. In Northern Virginia, Puerto Ricans are spread out, but higher concentrations are present in Stafford County, Spotsylvania County, Prince William County, and King George County.

=== North Carolina ===
In North Carolina, there are significant and growing Puerto Rican populations in Fayetteville, and the metro areas of Raleigh/Durham and Charlotte. There are also notable numbers of Puerto Ricans in places like Concord in the Charlotte area, Clayton in the Raleigh area, Jacksonville, Winston-Salem, Greensboro, and Greenville.

=== Georgia ===
In Georgia, over two-thirds of the state's Puerto Rican population is located in the Atlanta metropolitan area. In the Atlanta area, the Puerto Rican population is spread out, but present in significant numbers in Atlanta, Marietta, as well as many smaller cities in Gwinnett County, Henry County, and Cobb County. The remainder is in other areas throughout the state, especially cities like Savannah, Augusta, Hinesville, and Columbus usually with ties to Fort Benning.

=== Delaware ===
In Delaware, the majority of the Puerto Rican population lives in New Castle County, especially Wilmington and Elsmere among other cities. Kent County also has a significant Puerto Rican population, especially in Dover.

=== Maryland ===
In Maryland, over 80 percent of Maryland's Puerto Rican population lives in Central Maryland, split nearly evenly between the Baltimore area and the Maryland portion of the DC area. Maryland's Puerto Rican population is much smaller and more scattered compared to areas further north along the east coast. There is a small Puerto Rican population in Baltimore, as well as in many smaller cities throughout Central Maryland.

=== Texas ===
In Texas, the vast majority of the state's Puerto Rican population is present in the Texas Triangle mega-region, especially in and around the cities of Houston, San Antonio, Austin, Dallas, and Killeen. San Antonio has the largest Puerto Rican population of any city in the state of Texas, but on a greater metropolitan level, Dallas metro area has largest. This is because most Puerto Ricans in the San Anontion area live inside city limits, while in the Dallas area most live outside the city. However, no major Texas city really stands out as Puerto Ricans are evenly spread out throughout the major areas of Texas. In the Dallas area, there are large Puerto Rican populations in Fort Worth, Arlington, Grand Prairie, and Denton. In the Houston area, significant Puerto Rican populations are present in League City and Galveston. Copperas Cove, along with larger neighboring Killeen, has a significant Puerto Rican community with strong ties to the Fort Cavazos military base.

== Puerto Ricans in the Midwest ==
Midwestern United States

The Midwestern United States is home to 561,000 Puerto Ricans, comprising 10% of the Puerto Rican population nationwide. A little less than two-thirds of the population can be found in three Metropolitan Statistical Areas: Chicago, Cleveland, and Milwaukee. Only in Cleveland are Puerto Ricans the largest Hispanic group.

=== Illinois ===
In Illinois, the Puerto Rican population is highly concentrated in the northeast corner of the state, the Illinois portion of the Chicago metropolitan area, with 92% of the Illinois Puerto Rican population located in this area, nearly half in the city of Chicago alone and most of the remaining concentrated in Chicago's suburbs, including Berwyn, Waukegan, Aurora, Cicero, Elgin, Romeoville. The Humboldt Park neighborhood is home to the largest concentration of Puerto Ricans in the Midwest.

=== Ohio ===
In Ohio, the majority of the Puerto Rican population is found in Northeast Ohio, over half can be found in the Cleveland metro area alone. Cleveland has the largest population of Puerto Ricans in the state and the highest percentage of Puerto Ricans of any major city in the Midwest. The Northeast Ohio area has the highest concentration of Puerto Ricans in the Midwest by percentage and highest in any state outside the eastcoast, with Lorain having the highest Puerto Rican percentage outside the eastcoast. There are many other Ohio cities with significant Puerto Rican populations, particularly in Northeast Ohio, including the Cleveland suburbs of Parma, Parma Heights, Brook Park, Brooklyn, Middleburg Heights, Lakewood, Lorain, Sheffield Lake, and Elyria, as well as other Northeast Ohio places like Youngstown, Campbell, and Ashtabula. The Columbus area in Central Ohio also has a large and growing Puerto Rican population. In recent years, Ohio has replaced Illinois as the most popular Midwest destination for Puerto Ricans, with many more choosing the Cleveland and Columbus areas of Ohio over the Chicago area.

=== Wisconsin ===
In Wisconsin, 53% of the Puerto Rican population resides in the city of Milwaukee. The remaining portion is mostly in southeastern Wisconsin, in areas near Milwaukee and Chicago, such as Kenosha, Racine, West Allis, and Greenfield.

=== Indiana ===
Elsewhere in the Midwest, in Indiana, Northwest Indiana has many Puerto Ricans in cities such as Hammond, Portage, and East Chicago. The city of Indianapolis also has a small population. The majority of Indiana's Puerto Rican population is in Northwest Indiana, with most of the remaining portion in the Indianapolis area.

=== Michigan ===
In Michigan, the Puerto Rican population is relatively small, yet mostly present in Detroit and Pontiac in the Detroit area. Sizeable numbers are also in the Grand Rapids area.

The Southwest Detroit Oakwood Heights neighborhood, has a big Puerto Rican community, at over 20%. Other nearby areas like Springwells and other parts of SW and South Detroit, Millenium Village, and Corktown also have sizable Puerto Rican populations, clocking over 4% for each of them. The PR population is rather scant in most parts of northern Detroit.

== Puerto Ricans in the West ==
Western United States

The Western United States is home to 465,000 Puerto Ricans, comprising 8% of the Puerto Rican population nationwide. Most Puerto Ricans in the western US live in California, smaller numbers live in areas like Las Vegas, Nevada and Phoenix, Arizona, as well as the Honolulu metropolitan area in Hawaii.

=== California ===
In California, Puerto Rican populations are largely present in Los Angeles, Long Beach, San Diego, and many other cities in Southern California and the Inland Empire region, as well as the Bay Area, especially San Francisco.

Barrio Logan in San Diego is 3% Puerto Rican, well over California's 0.6% Puerto Rican figure. Other areas, like the North Island Naval Air Station, have a large Puerto Rican American military personnel presence. Del Mar Heights also has a sizable Puerto Rican community.

== See also ==
- Puerto Rican migration to New York City
- Nuyorican
- Puerto Ricans in Chicago
- History of the Puerto Ricans in Philadelphia
- Puerto Ricans in Holyoke, Massachusetts
- Puerto Rican migration to Hawaii
- Puerto Ricans in the Virgin Islands
- Puerto Ricans in the United States
- Puerto Rican people
