= John Cortes (Florida politician) =

American politician

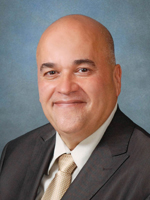

Member of the Florida House of Representatives from the 43rd district
- In office November 4, 2014 – November 3, 2020
- Preceded by: Ricardo Rangel
- Succeeded by: Kristen Arrington

Personal details
- Born: March 25, 1961 (age 65) New York City, New York
- Party: Democratic
- Spouse: Caridad "Cary" Cortes
- Children: Caridad Esther, John Paul Cortes
- Education: John Jay College of Criminal Justice
- Profession: Corrections officer

John Cortes (born March 25, 1961) is a Democratic politician from Florida. He served three terms in the Florida House of Representatives from 2014 to 2020, representing northern Osceola County including Buenaventura Lakes, Campbell, Kissimmee, and Poinciana.

== Early life and career ==
Cortes was born in Brooklyn in 1961 and attended the John Jay College of Criminal Justice from 1980 to 1981, though he did not graduate, and later worked as a corrections officer.

In 2004, Cortes ran for the Kissimmee City Commission from Seat 3, and placed second to Jerry Gemskie in the general election, receiving 22% of the vote to Gemskie's 24%. Because no candidate received a majority, a runoff election was held in which Cortes lost to Gemskie in a landslide, winning only 33% of the vote.

Cortes ran for Mayor of Kissimmee in 2006, and, once again, because no candidate received a majority, Cortes advanced to a runoff election with former City Commissioner Jim Swan, who beat Cortes handily. When Swan ran for re-election in 2008, Cortes ran against him again, but was defeated convincingly, receiving only 26% of the vote to Swan's 58%.

Cortes ran for the City Commission from Seat 2 in 2010, but placed last, winning only 9% of the vote.

== Florida House of Representatives ==
In 2012, Cortes initially planned on running for the Florida House of Representatives from the 43rd District in the Democratic primary, but dropped out, leaving Ricardo Rangel as the uncontested nominee. Cortes challenged Rangel in the Democratic primary in 2014, and, in a "major upset," defeated Rangel for re-election, winning 52% of the vote to Rangel's 48%. In the general election, Cortes raced former Kissimmee City Commissioner Carlos Irizarry, who had previously beat him in his 2004 city commission campaign. The Orlando Sentinel criticized both candidates, asserting that "both candidates have bankruptcies in their pasts" and that "both have had troubling brushes with the law," but gave a "qualified nod to Irizarry for his experience in government, and his deeper knowledge of the issues he would face as a member of the Legislature." Despite the Sentinel's criticism, however, Cortes defeated Irizarry handily, winning 66% of the vote to Irizarry's 34%.

Cortes was reelected to the House in 2016 and 2018. In 2020, he ran for Osceola County clerk of court but was defeated in the Democratic primary, coming in second to Kelvin Soto by 43–23%.

== See also ==
- Florida House of Representatives
