= Ricardo Rangel (politician) =

American politician

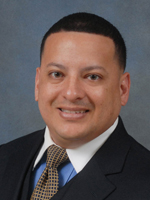

Member of the Florida House of Representatives from the 43rd district
- In office November 20, 2012 – November 18, 2014
- Preceded by: Jimmie Todd Smith
- Succeeded by: John Cortes

Personal details
- Born: June 5, 1977 (age 49) Bronx, NY
- Party: Democratic
- Children: Andres, Linda, Diana, & Oriana
- Education: Warner University (B.A.) (M.A.)
- Profession: Business consultant

Military service
- Allegiance: United States of America
- Branch/service: United States Army
- Years of service: 1996–2010 Active Duty; 2010–present Florida National Guard
- Rank: Staff Sergeant

Ricardo Rangel (born June 5, 1977) is a former Democratic member of the Florida House of Representatives, representing the 43rd District, which is based in northern Osceola County, and includes Buenaventura Lakes, Campbell, Kissimmee, and Poinciana, serving from 2012 to 2014.

== History ==
Ricardo Rangel parents are from Guayaquil, Ecuador but Rangel was born in Bronx, NY, and moved to the state of Florida in 1999. Upon graduating high school, he enlisted in the United States Army, and served for 14 years, he continued his military career as a sergeant Financial Analyst in the Florida National Guard. Rangel worked for a number of nonprofit organizations, including Big Brothers Big Sisters of America, and ran a number of political campaigns across the country. He ended up attending Warner University in Lake Wales, where he received both his bachelor's and master's degrees in management, and was the first person in his family to graduate from college.

== Florida House of Representatives ==
In 2007, when incumbent State Representative John Quiñones, a Republican, resigned from the legislature to run for the Osceola County Commission, Rangel ran in the special election to succeed him in the 49th District. Once Rangel saw that support was growing for Soto, Rangel suspended his campaign. Rangel also sent Soto a check in a sign of support. Being that it was a special election Rangel could not have his name removed from the ballot.

When the legislature districts were redrawn in 2012, Rangel opted to run in the newly created 43rd District, and won the nomination of the Democratic Party entirely uncontested, and advanced to the general election, where he faced Republican nominee Art Otero, the Vice-Mayor of Kissimmee. Rangel received the endorsement of the Florida Police Benevolent Association and the Florida AFL–CIO; he was outraised by Otero, who also claimed the endorsement of the Orlando Sentinel, which criticized Rangel for running an "under the radar" campaign and for being a "cipher to voters." Despite this, however, Rangel defeated Otero in a landslide, winning 68% of the vote.

While serving in the legislature Rep. Rangel was recognized as the most influential freshman legislator, as he led the charge to remove the in coming minority leader for corruption and misleading his peers. Rep. Rangel sponsored, co-sponsored and passed many bills in the legislature.
