= John Cortes =

John Cortes may refer to:

- John Cortes (Gibraltarian politician)
- John Cortes (Florida politician)
