= Desert Inn (disambiguation) =

Desert Inn may refer to:

- Desert Inn, a former hotel and casino in Las Vegas, Nevada, United States
  - Desert Inn Road, a major west–east road named after the hotel
- Desert Inn and Restaurant, a former historic site in Yeehaw Junction, Florida, United States
- "Desert Inn", a 1985 electronic song by Yello from the album Stella (album)
