= Ricardo Rangel =

Ricardo Rangel may refer to:

- Ricardo Rangel (photojournalist)
- Ricardo Rangel (politician)
