= Hart Memorial Central Library =

Public library in Kissimmee, Florida, US

- 28.29192°N 81.40386°W
- Location: Kissimmee, Florida
- Type: Public library
- Established: 1910
- Branch of: Osceola Library System

Other information
- Website: http://www.myosceolalibrary.org/hartmemorial/

The Hart Memorial Central Library is a member of the Osceola Library System. It is the headquarters of the Osceola Library system.

Located on Dakin Avenue in downtown Kissimmee, Florida, United States, the two-story library is home to the Ray Shanks Law Library and a specialized Genealogy Collection.

== History ==
In 1910, Kissimmee's first public library was built at North Stewart Avenue on land donated by Mrs. Catherine S. Hart, who was the widow of the tenth governor of Florida, Ossian B. Hart. Her home was used as a post office, bookstore, and then finally a library. The local chapter of the American Woman's League donated books and furniture. The Stewart Avenue building was demolished in 1986 to make room for the city communications center.

In 1968, the Hart Memorial Library moved to its current four-thousand-square-foot building at the corner of Broadway and Dakin Avenue. In 2004, the building was renovated after back-to-back hurricanes caused over a million dollars' worth of structural damage.

== Special Collections ==
- Ray Shanks Law Library and Genealogy
