= Osceola Library System =

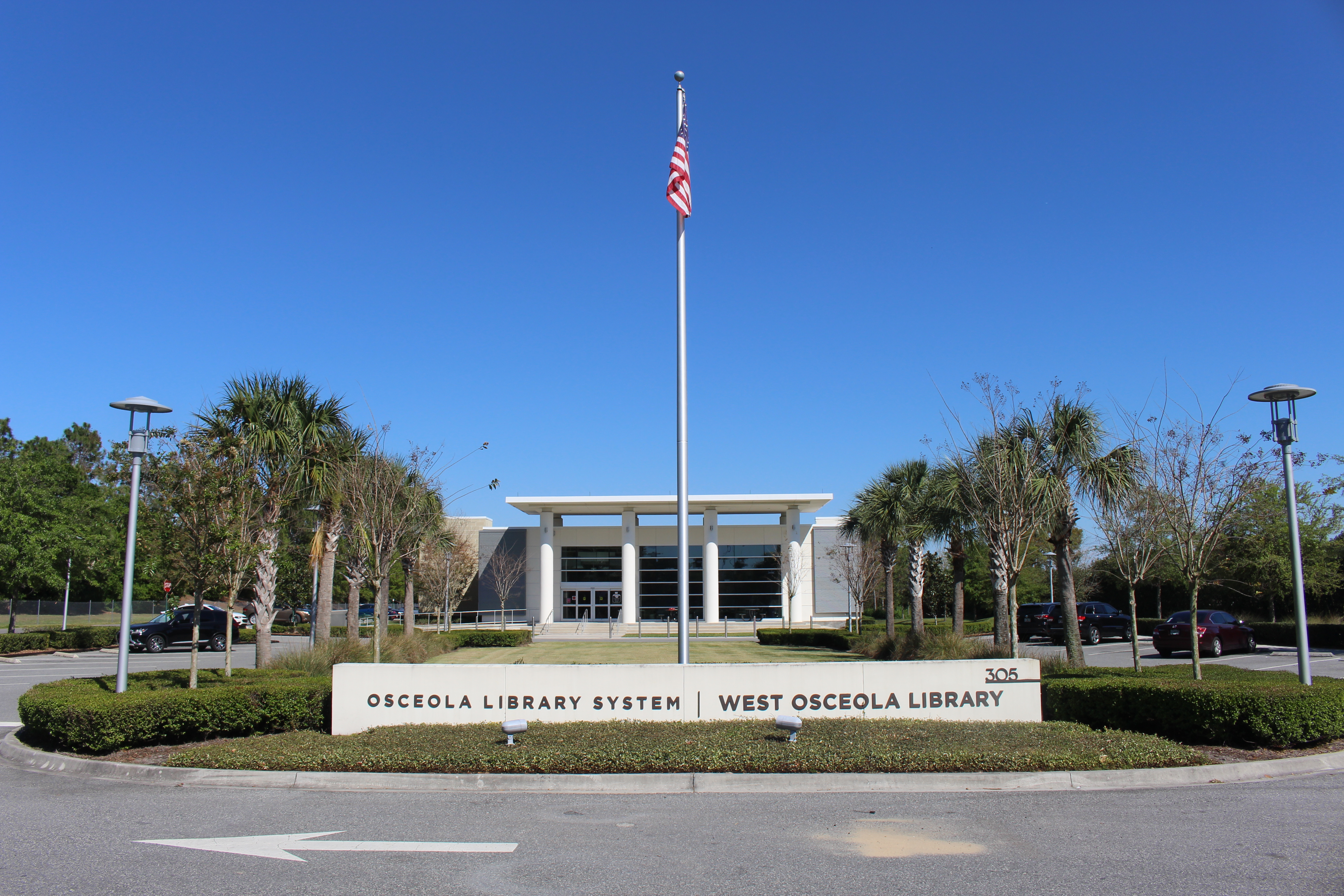
West Osceola Branch Library in Celebration, Florida

The Osceola Library System is a public library system serving Osceola County in Central Florida. The main branch is the Hart Memorial Central Library in historic downtown Kissimmee. The system has large branch locations in St. Cloud, Buenaventura Lakes, Poinciana, and West Osceola/Celebration, a small branch in Kenansville, and express lockers in Reunion and Narcoossee.

The Osceola Library System was named Florida Library of the Year by the FLA in 2007 for Innovation in Customer Service.

== History ==
The Osceola Library System began operations in 1989 as an independent organization offering library services to all residents of Osceola County. Before that, library service had been provided by the Orange County Library System on a contractual basis.

From early in the twentieth century until 1969, library services in Osceola County were provided by two small libraries, both operated independently by women's organizations: Hart Memorial Public Library on North Stewart Avenue in Kissimmee and Veterans Memorial Library on Massachusetts Avenue in St. Cloud.

Hart Memorial Public Library was located on land donated in 1910 by Carrie S. Hart, widow of a former Governor of Florida, Ossian B. Hart. In 1914 a group of ladies in Kissimmee donated $52 each and collected additional funds from citizens to build the Hart Memorial Public Library. A charter was issued to the Hart Memorial Chapter of the American Women's League and Annie Palmer Fell widow of Nelson Fell, founder of the Narcoossee and Fellsmore, donated books and furnishings from her library to help begin the public library.

In 1911 the Lakes Improvement Club established a reading room in a building in Oak Grove Park. In 1916 the Club raised $782 for lots on Massachusetts Avenue in St. Cloud to build a library. They paid $709 for the lots and the remaining $73 went into a building fund. Meanwhile, the wife of Colonel McElroy, president of the land company, donated a supply of books for the reading room

The bank where the Club had deposited the building fund failed in 1918, in the aftermath of World War 1. Undaunted, the members of the Ladies Improvement Club raised the funds again and the Veterans Memorial Library was named in honest of the generous donations of the Grand Army of the Republic was fraternal organization of Union Army Civil War Veterans.

These two small, independent libraries served their communities well. However, by 1967, the area was growing and residents recognized a need for a larger, community-sponsored library. In 1967 the Board of County Commissioners of Osceola County appointed a committee to study the feasibility of a regional library system in conjunction with Orange County.

Members of the feasibility committee included William Wallis, William Prather, Robert Fisk, Ms. William Sippel, Mrs. Murray Overstreet, Jr., Mrs. Paul Kirkpatrick, and Mrs. J.J. Griffin, Jr. Commissioner Luzadder was the liaison commissioner for the committee.

The first Library Advisory Board was appointed by the Board of County Commissioners of Osceola County in 1968. Members were William T. Wallis, Robert A. Fisk, William H. Prather, Mrs. Paul E. Kirkpatrick, Mrs. Murray W. Overstreet, Jr., Mrs. W.B. Makinson, and Mrs. J.J. Griffin, Jr.

Meanwhile, the Public Library of Kissimmee moved from the original Hart Memorial location to a new 4,000-square-foot space at the corner of Broadway and Kain in 1968; in the early 1970's, the Veterans Memorial Library moved from its Massachusetts Avenue location to the old downtown Sunbank building at 10th Street and New York Avenue in St. Cloud.

Developments lead to an independent library when County Ordinance 79-2, was approved on March 26, 1979, creating a Library District to provide comprehensive library services to all Osceola County residents. The District was given authority to levy up to 0.5 millage with the approval of the Board of County Commissioners.

Between 1969 and 1989, the Orange County Library System provided library service to Osceola residents on a contractual basis that included staffing and purchasing, as well as a local Kissimmee tieline phone number to the reference desk at the Orlando Public Library. At the end of the agreement, Osceola taxpayers were paying the Orange County Library System nearly $500,000 per year for services.

The Poinciana Branch Library, opened in 1988, was housed in a modular building - the first of its kind in the state - with movable circular bookshelves. Located in Doverplum Shopping Center at Cypress Parkway, the 1,800-square-foot building cost $300,00 and housed approximately 14,000 books.

A milestone was achieved in 1989 when Osceola's first library director, Hester O'Leary, was hired.

In February 1989 the County Commissioners voted to sever the contract with Orange County Library System when it expired on March 31, 1989. On April 1, 1989, the Osceola Library System began operations as an independent organization offering library services to all residents of Osceola County.

The Osceola Library began with three small branches and a total book collection of approximately 70,000 volumes; explosive growth was experienced over the ensuing years.

The new library grew steadily and a new 12,000-square-foot Buenaventura Lakes Branch Library was opened to the public in 1990. It was the first stand-alone building for the new county-controlled library system. In 1991 a group of dedicated volunteers opened the Kenansville Branch Library, which shared space with the old Kenansville School.

A new headquarters location was opened in January 1994 with a new 43,000-square-foot building on the site that formerly housed the Mickler & Sons Orange Crate Company. The fifteen-acre parcel is owned by the City of Kissimmee, with two acres committed to the library system.

The rapid growth continued during the 1990s and the Veterans Memorial Library-St. Cloud branch opened in 1995 in a 15,000-square-foot space in the old Sunbank building on Indiana Avenue and 13th Street in St. Cloud. The 11,860-square-foot Poinciana Branch Library opened in 1998 at the corner of Doverplum Avenue and San Remo Road. The $1 million branch, with 40,000 books, Internet computers, and ample parking, was a substantial improvement over the old modular building.

In 2000, an Interlocal Agreement was signed by the School Board of Osceola County and the Osceola County Board of County Commissioners to provide public library service in fast-growing communities. This same year, Narcoossee Library Annex opened in the Narcoossee Community School Media Center.

The West Osceola Branch Library opened in 2006 in a 2,000-square-foot storefront on busy highway 192 near Celebration. Previously, the Celebration area's needs had been served from a small space shared with the Celebration School.

Three back-to-back hurricanes pummeled Osceola County, causing more than a million dollars' worth of structural damage to the Hart Memorial Central Library. The Kenansville Branch Library was a total loss and other locations received minor damage. The Hart Memorial Central Library was closed for five months for repairs and renovations. During this period, the Osceola Library System served Kenansville area customers two days a week from the Kenansville Community Center. During reconstruction of the Hart Memorial Central Library, customers could call ahead, and then pick up resources through the back door during limited hours.

The Kenansville Branch Library was reestablished in 2007 with a new modular unit housing more than 6,400 resources, including children's books, bestsellers, DVDs, and large-print books. Customers may also surf the web on two Internet computers or bring their own WiFi ready laptops and connect to the Library's free WiFi.

Since operations began in 1989, the collection has increased to over 343,000 books and a combined audio/video collection of over 13,000. Located in the heart of one of the world's favorite tourist destinations, it has seen library visits increase to almost 500,000 a year with a circulation of over 625,000 resources.

In April 2007, Osceola Library System was named Library of the Year 2007 for Innovation in Customer Service by the Florida Library Association. The Library was recognized for the implementation of a new customer friendly service model that removed desks and the stereotypical image of the librarian, and replaced them with smaller checkout pods, approachable staff, and more interactive areas for children, families, and teens.

On January 3, 2012, the Osceola Library System became the first library system in Florida to outsource its management to the independent library management company, LSSI (Library Systems & Services LLC).LSSI, founded in 1981, is one of the country's largest providers of library services.

In early 2016, it was announced that four branches would undergo $5 million in renovations for upgrades and are expected to be completed at the beginning of 2017.

== Services ==
Each full-service library has reference librarians, public internet access computers, wireless printing, a wide range of in-library online databases, fiction and non-fiction books, magazines and newspapers, audio-visual resources featuring DVDs, books on CD and music, as well as adult, teen, and children's programming. The Osceola Library System provides free multipurpose rooms for lawful public use in each full service library.

The library often hosts community events and the reference department participates in Ask-a-Librarian and offers a wide range of computer classes.

Osceola Library System is among the first wave of libraries embracing the concept of Web 2.0. The Library website incorporates blogs, rss feeds and e-notification features, Facebook with a Calendar of Events, Flickr photo albums, and other forms of social networking.

== Branches ==
- Memorial Central Library - Kissimmee, Florida
- Veterans Memorial Library, - St. Cloud, Florida
- Buenaventura Branch Library - Buenaventura Lakes, Florida
- Poinciana Branch Library- Poinciana, Florida
- West Osceola Branch Library - Celebration, Florida
- Kenansville Branch Library - Kenansville, Florida

== See also ==
- Kissimmee, Florida
- Osceola County, Florida
- St. Cloud, Florida
- Buenaventura Lakes, Florida
- Celebration, Florida
- Poinciana, Florida
- List of Libraries
