= Destiny, Florida =

Urban development project in Florida, US

Coordinates: 27.68°N 80.95°W

Destiny, Florida was a large-scale urban development project in Osceola County near Yeehaw Junction, Florida. The project was a joint partnership between the Pugliese Development Co. of Delray Beach and FD Destiny LLC, owned by Fred DeLuca. It was one of 16 initial projects of “climate positive" real estate developments supported by the Clinton Climate Initiative. The project faced delays due to lawsuits and opposition from Florida state agencies and fell apart. The main portion of the land previously intended for the project has since been donated for conservation.

== Proposed development ==
The project planned for the eventual development of a 41,300-acre (167 km^{2}) property to include 88,000 to 100,000 residential units for a population of 200,000 to 250,000 residents. Initial plans, scheduled to begin in 2011, called for up to 10,000 residential units and 7,000,000 square feet (650,000 m^{2}) of business use. The proposed infrastructure was based on a large-scale "climate positive" community entirely supported through sustainable energy. Sources of energy would have included a 30MW solar array, a waste management system for extracting methane, and an energy farm for the production of biofuel.

== Controversy ==
In 2009 Osceola County proposed an amendment in its comprehensive building plan for a "new city overlay on more than 500,000 acres in a rural area in the county", which would allow for the construction of the Destiny development as well as several other large-scale projects. The Florida Department of Community Affairs opposed the amendment, citing the Florida’s Growth Management Act and stating the amendment would contribute to urban sprawl.

There was additional opposition to the development from the Avon Park Air Force Range which had been requested by the developers to change its flight ceiling from 500 feet (150 m) to 5,000 feet (1,500 m). The Air Force said this would interfere with flight training.

In September 2009, Fred DeLuca filed suit against Anthony Pugliese of the Pugliese Development Company claiming mismanagement of the Destiny project and misuse of project funding for personal use. On September 29, 2009, Anthony Pugliese and Fred DeLuca entered into an Agreed Order whereby Pugliese agreed to "temporarily relinquish control" of the project. In December 2009, Pugliese filed a five billion dollar lawsuit against DeLuca for fraudulent financial practices associated with creating loans for the Destiny project.

In April 2010, Osceola County postponed further development of the comprehensive plan due to the state opposition and the court litigation.

In June 2016, a judge ordered Pugliese pay $13 million to DeLuca's estate. Further court rulings raised that sum to over $20 million by 2018.

== DeLuca Preserve ==
In late 2020, a 27,000-acre (110 km^{2}) section of land formerly intended for the project was donated by Fred DeLuca's widow Elisabeth to the University of Florida under the provision that it remain preserved in its undeveloped state. Under the conditions of the donation, Ducks Unlimited has been given the responsibility to enforce the conservation easement on the land, which is now called the DeLuca Preserve. The university is able to use the land for teaching and research purposes, íncluding some amount of experimental citriculture.
