= Desert Inn and Restaurant =

Historic site in Yeehaw Junction, Florida, US

- Formerly listed on the U.S. National Register of Historic Places
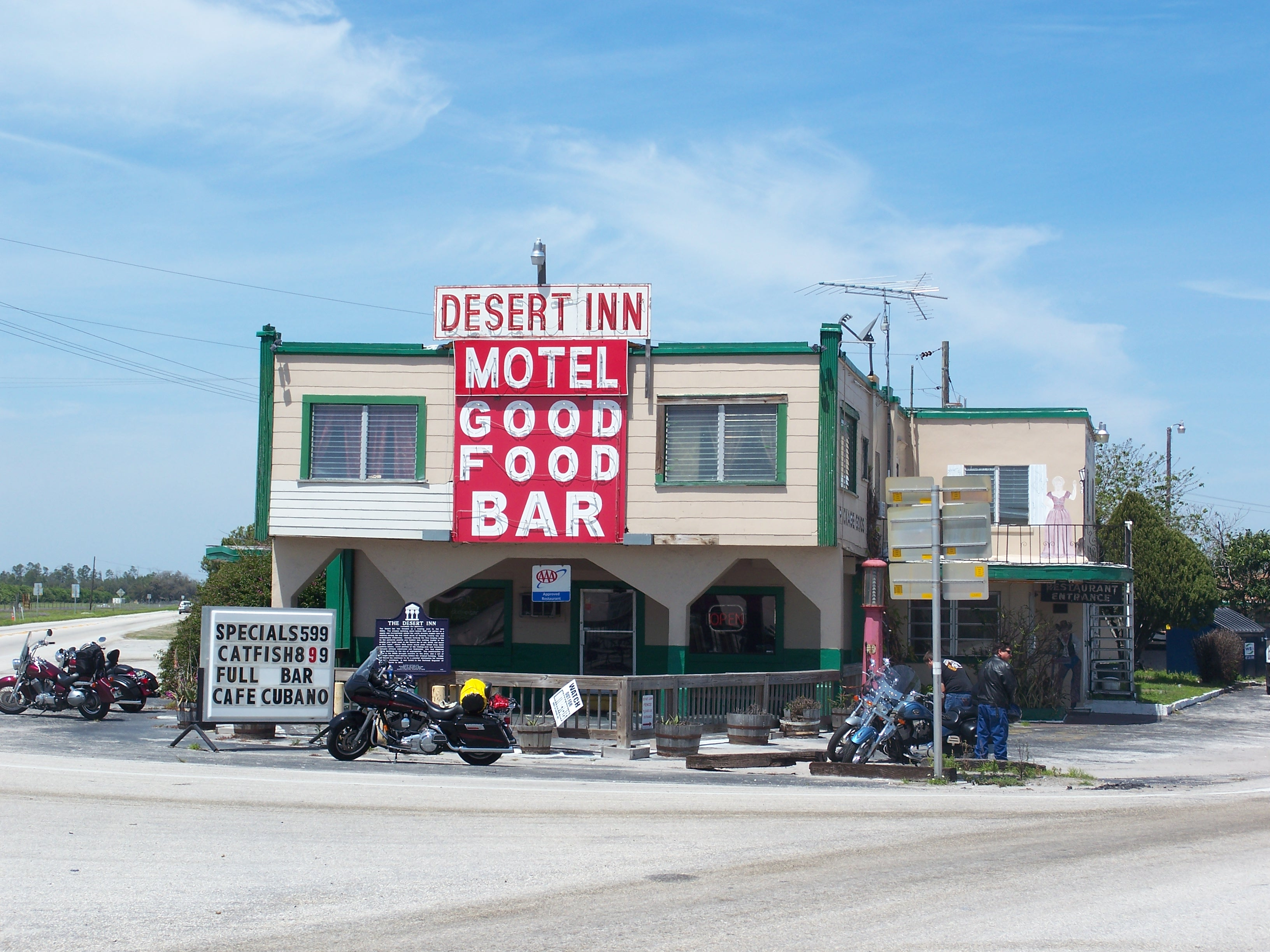

- Location within Florida Location within the United States
- Location: Osceola County, Florida, USA
- Nearest city: Yeehaw Junction, Florida
- Coordinates: 27°42′0″N 80°54′18″W
- Demolished: September 5, 2024
- NRHP reference No.: 93001158

Significant dates
- Added to NRHP: January 3, 1994
- Removed from NRHP: January 14, 2026

The Desert Inn and Restaurant (also known as Wilson's Corner) was a historic site in Yeehaw Junction, Florida, United States. It was located at 5570 South Kenansville Road, next to SR 60. It was added to the U.S. National Register of Historic Places on January 3, 1994 and was demolished on September 5, 2024.

== History ==
In the 1930s, the spot was originally named "Jackass Crossing," a reference to the burros that ranchers rode to Desert Inn.

As early as 1889, the Desert Inn was a bar room and brothel for cowboys and lumber workers. The Desert Inn did not have full-service water and electricity until 1978.

Throughout the years, the Desert Inn was used as a trading post, gas station, and dance hall. In 1994, after being added to the National Register of Historic Places, the unused rooms above the restaurant were converted into a modest museum that featured a bordello suite with red carpet, lace pillows and a swing.

The Desert Inn closed in June 2018.

In the early morning hours of December 22, 2019, a tractor trailer crashed into the side of the inn. The trailer jackknifed and photos show the roof of the inn collapsed onto the roof of the tractor trailer. The president of the Osceola County Historical Society, which owned and operated the Desert Inn at the time, stated that a determination will be made if any part of the building can be saved pending a survey by a structural engineer. Fortunately, a few weeks prior, valuable artifacts from inside the Desert Inn were removed and put in their archives as part of a clean up day and restoration efforts.

The Osceola County Historical Society was court-ordered to sell the property on April 19, 2024 to V6 Holdings LLC, who demolished the property on September 5, 2024.

== Gallery ==
A small sample of our many photos of the Desert Inn and Restaurant

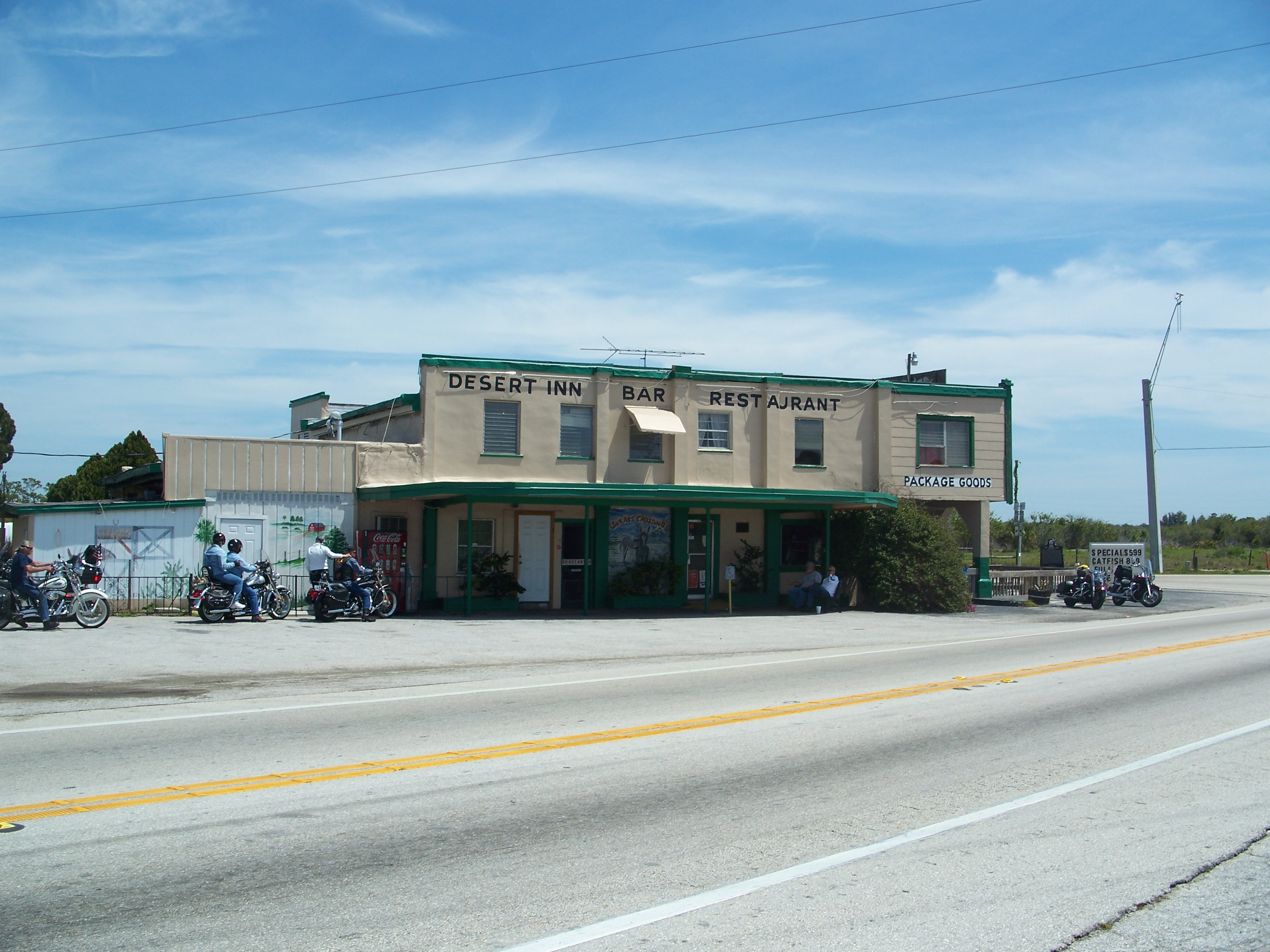
2010

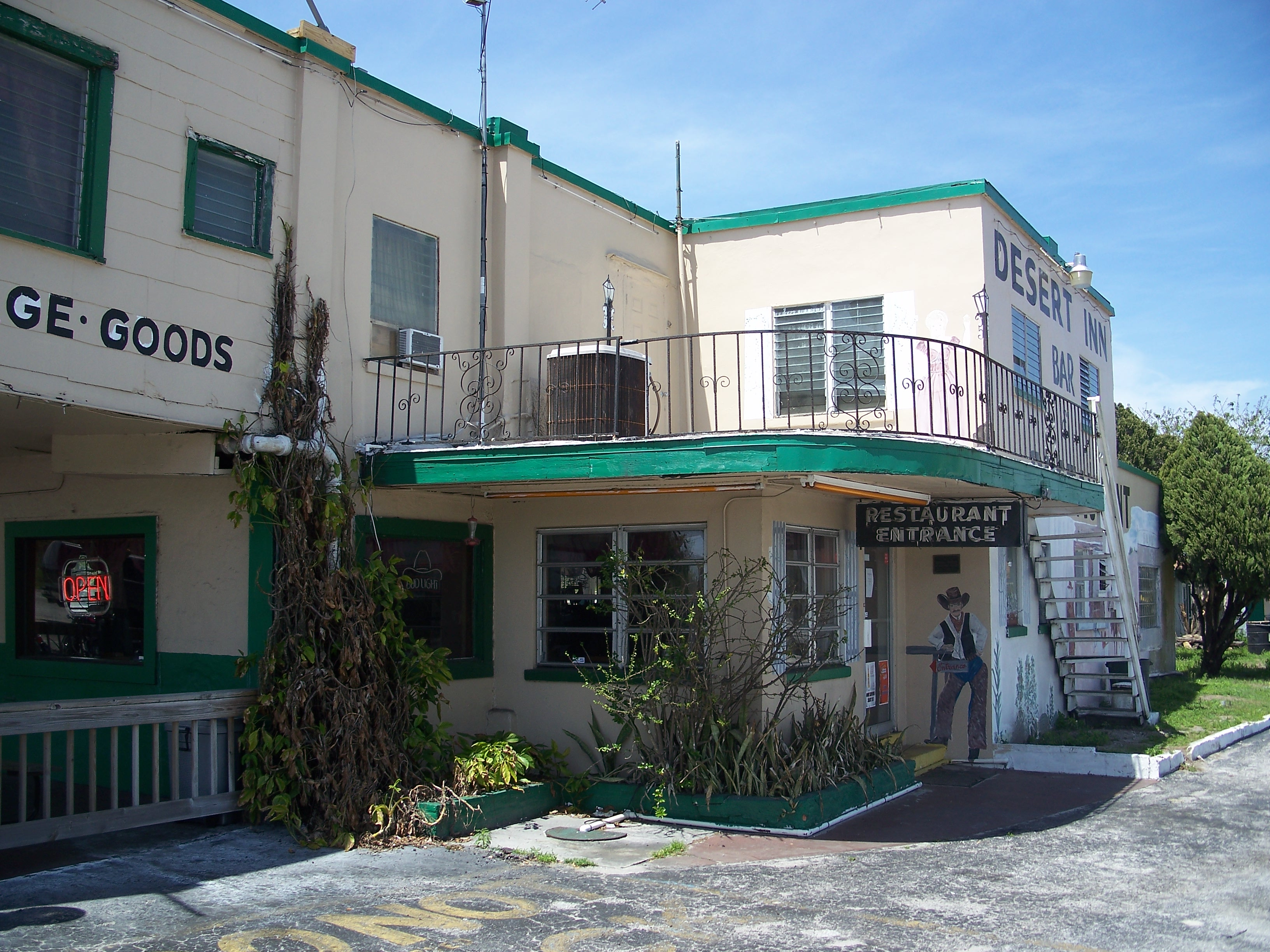
2010

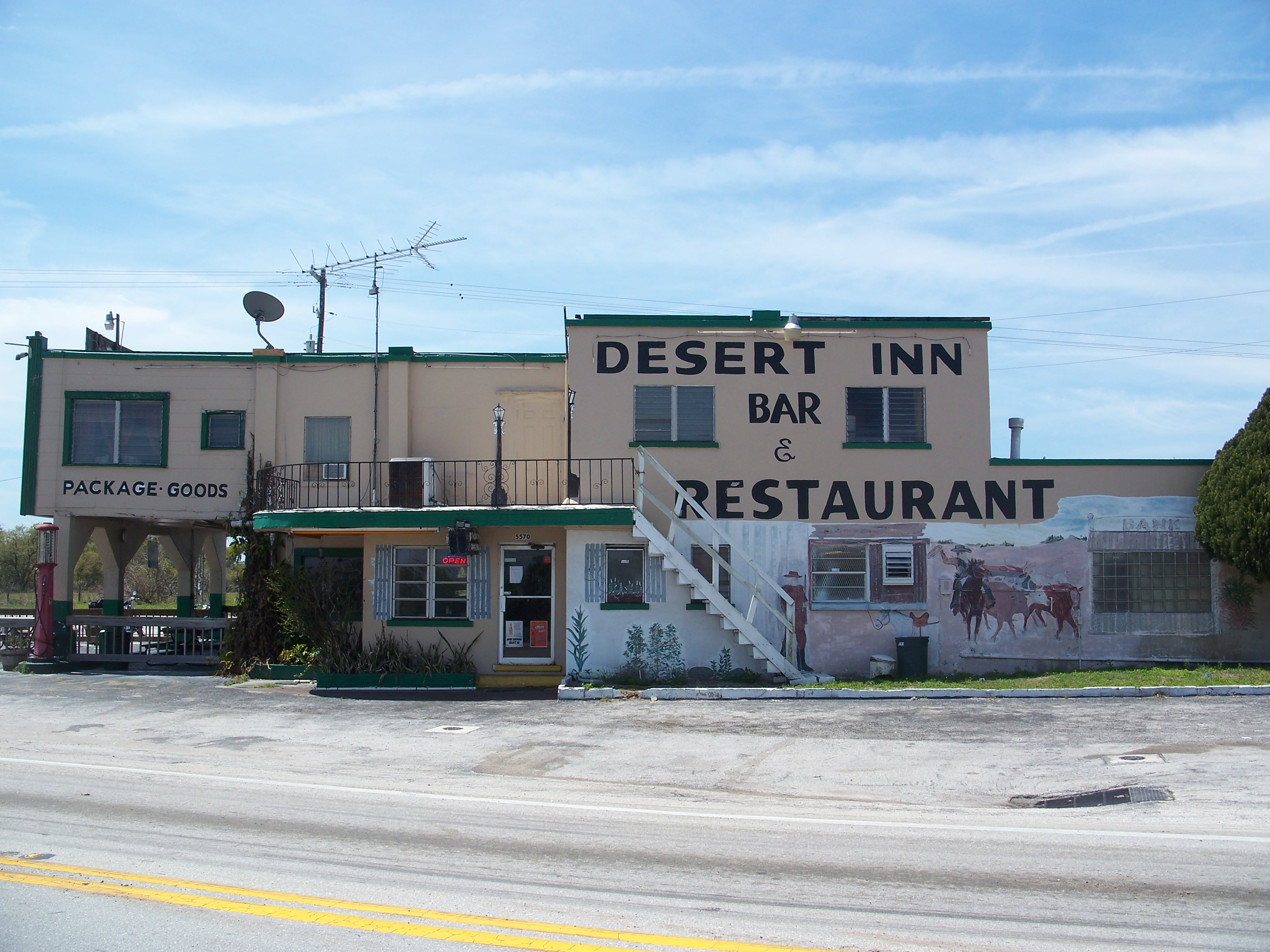
2010

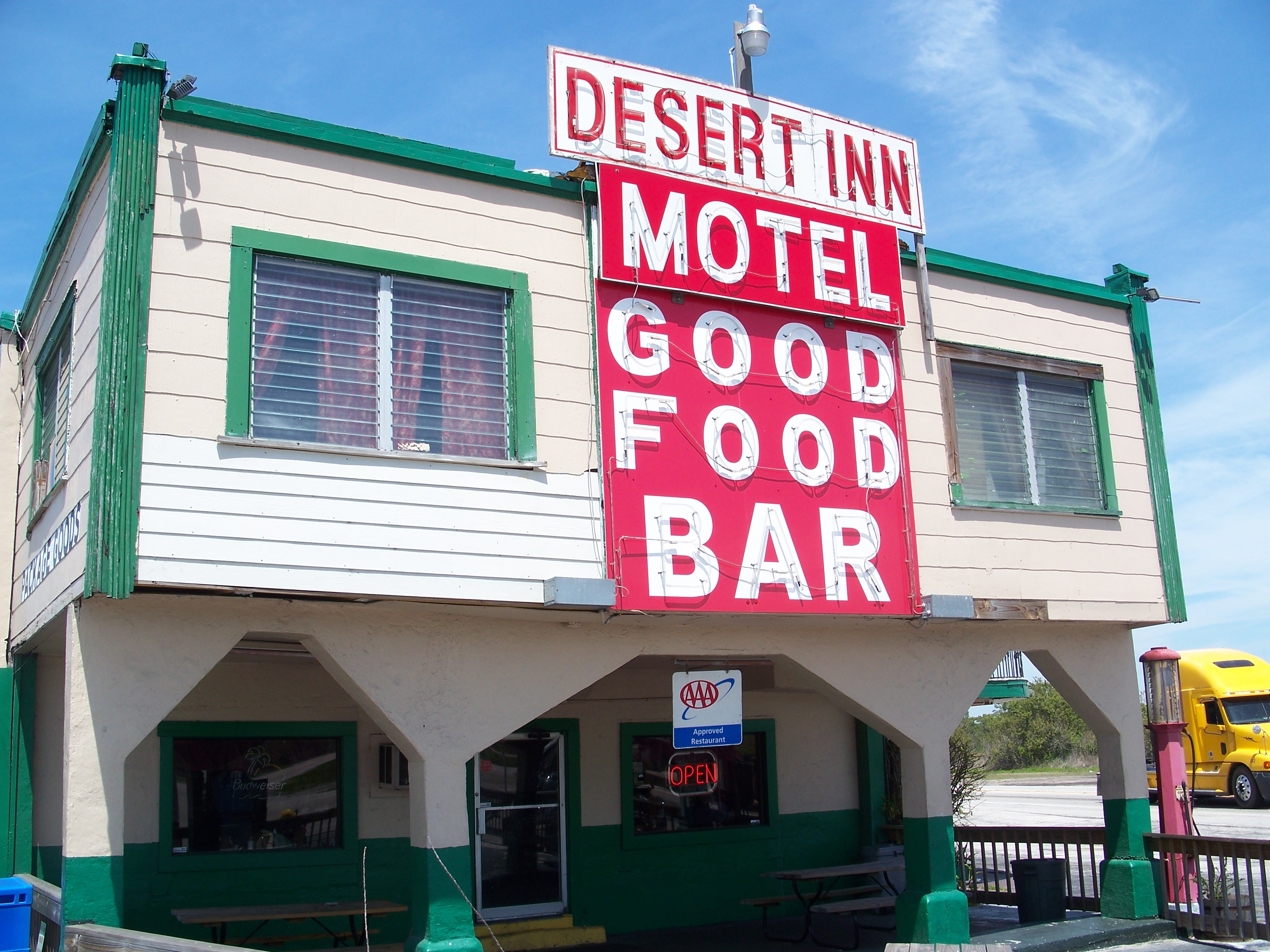
Sign, 2010

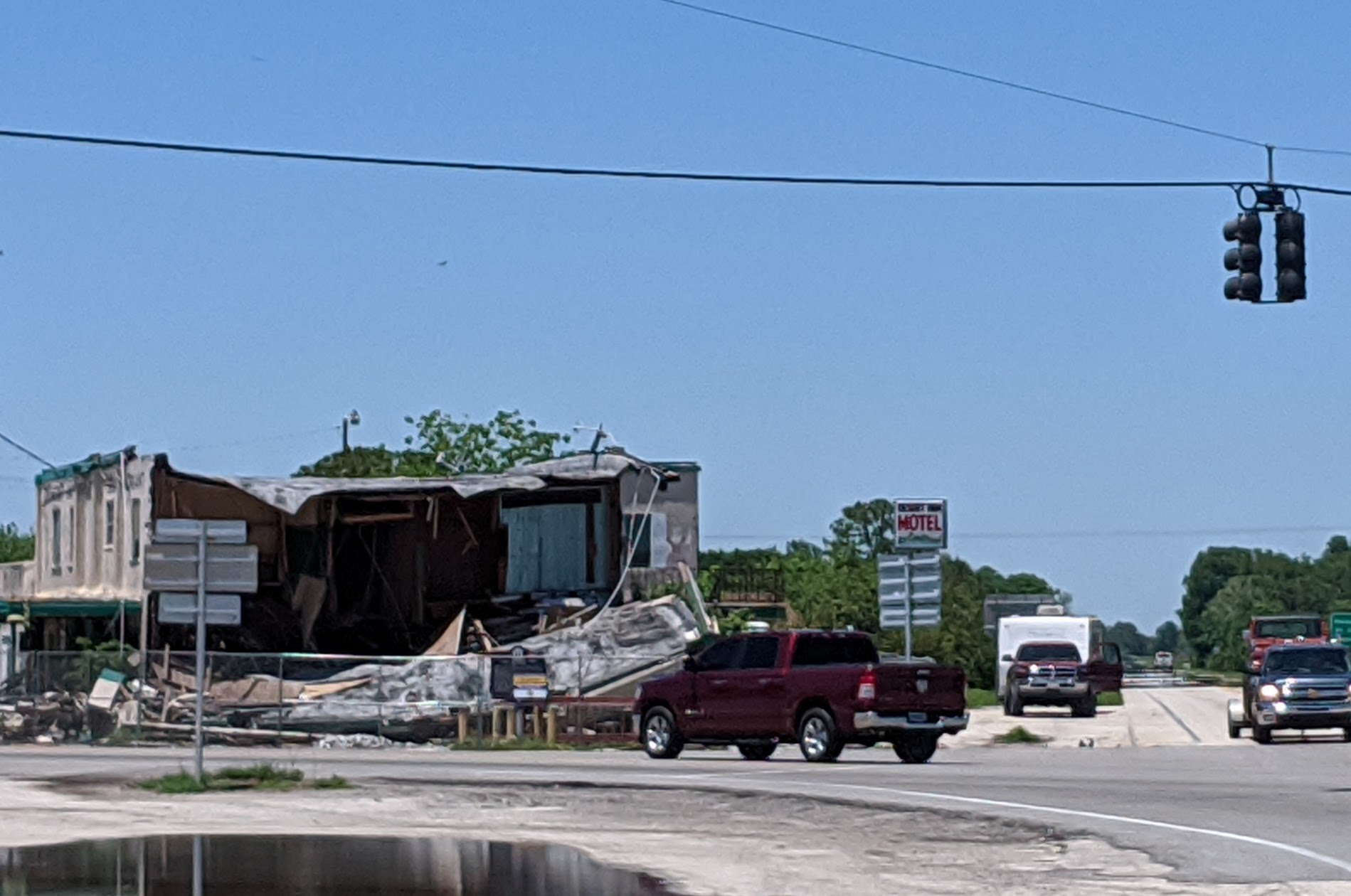
Ruins in May 2020
