= Yeehaw Junction, Florida =

- Census-designated place
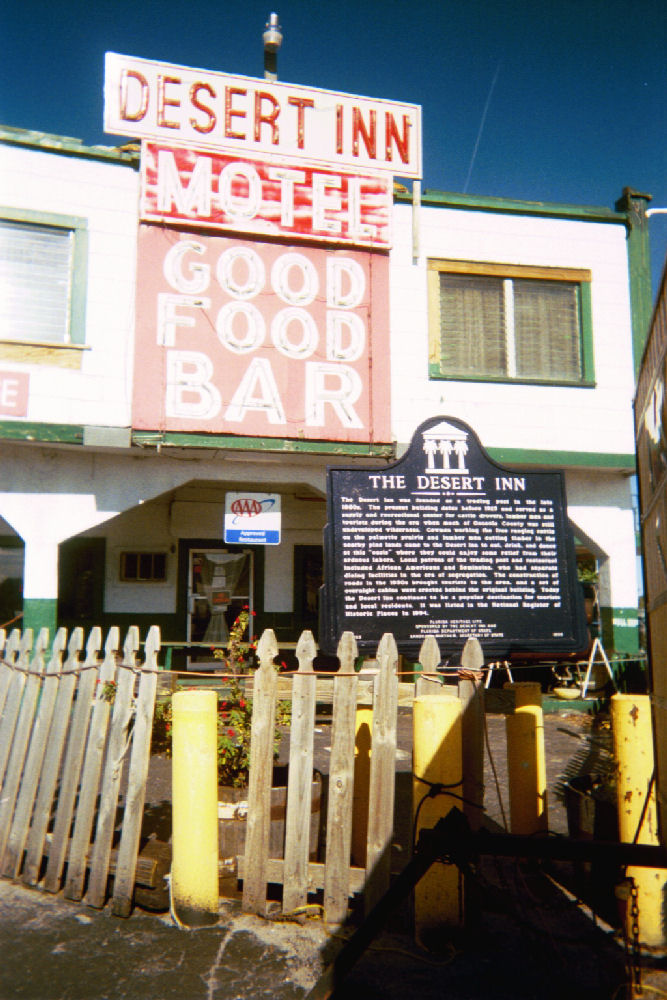
- Former Historic Desert Inn

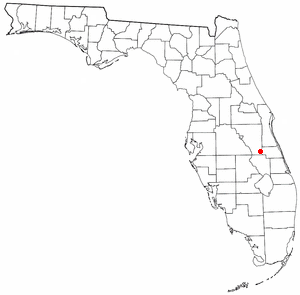
- Location of Yeehaw Junction, Florida
- Coordinates: 27°41′58″N 80°53′13″W
- Country: United States
- State: Florida
- County: Osceola

Area
  - Total: 1.88 sq mi (4.87 km^{2})
  - Land: 1.87 sq mi (4.84 km^{2})
  - Water: 0.012 sq mi (0.03 km^{2})
- Elevation: 49 ft (15 m)

Population (2020)
  - Total: 250
  - Density: 125.7/sq mi (48.52/km^{2})
- Time zone: UTC−5 (Eastern (EST))
  - Summer (DST): UTC−4 (EDT)
- ZIP Code: 34972
- Area code: 321
- FIPS code: 12-78975
- GNIS feature ID: 2403047

Yeehaw Junction is a census-designated place (CDP) in Osceola County, Florida, United States. As of the 2020 census, Yeehaw Junction had a population of 235. The area was confused with Buenaventura Lakes CDP in the 2000 census, and the correct data for the area was not recorded.

Yeehaw Junction is part of the Orlando–Kissimmee Metropolitan Statistical Area. The Destiny development was planned nearby.

== Geography ==
Yeehaw Junction is located at the intersection of US 441/SR 15, SR 60 and Florida's Turnpike (SR 91), approximately 30 miles (50 km) west of Vero Beach and 30 miles north of Lake Okeechobee. The location was named after the Yeehaw station on the Florida East Coast Railway's Kissimmee Valley Line, which passed through Yeehaw Junction from 1915 to 1947.

== History ==
Some say the community's name comes from the fact locals would yell "Yeehaw!", while others believe the name is derived from the Creek language word meaning "wolf". According to town historians and several original newspaper articles that were displayed at the Desert Inn and Restaurant, the town was originally named "Jackass Junction" or "Jackass Crossing". This name was given to the four-corner site back in the early 1930s, when local ranchers rode on burros to visit the Desert Inn (then the local brothel). As the 1950s approached, the Florida legislature felt that a name change was due in light of the construction of Florida's Turnpike through the center of the community in 1957, resulting in renaming the town to its present-day name.

=== Biological warfare experiment ===
In late 1968 the Deseret Test Center conducted a biological warfare experiment at Yeehaw Junction. The experiment was part of Project 112 and was labelled DTC Test 69–75. Stem rust, referred to as "Agent TX", was tested to determine its effectiveness against a wheat crop in time of war. The tests were conducted over a period of one month from October 31 to December 1, 1968. Live agent was sprayed by a U.S. Air Force McDonnell Douglas F-4 Phantom fighter jet on seven occasions and dead agent, consisting of spores that were killed by a gaseous mixture of ethylene oxide, was sprayed on four occasions. The stated objective of Deseret Test Center (DTC) Test 69-75 was to investigate the effectiveness of the F-4/A/B and 45Y-2/TX weapon systems to reduce Soviet wheat crop yields in selected geographic areas. The objective was subdivided into other tasks: determine the downwind travel of Agent TX released from the A/B 45Y-2 spray tank, estimate the yield reduction and loss of wheat crops attacked by the weapon system, study the effectiveness of killed TX as a simulant for Agent TX, and evaluate the adequacy to predict downwind dosages of Agent TX. The tests were unknown to local residents and officials until October 2002 when U.S. senator Bill Nelson demanded details of the tests from the U.S. Department of Defense after knowledge of the test was eventually revealed during a larger congressional inquiry of potential effects on participating veterans of chemical and biological testing. Eglin Air Force Base, Avon Park Air Force Range, Panama City, Belle Glade, and Fort Pierce, were additional sites in Florida of biological agent production and testing.

== Demographics ==
Historical population
Census	Pop.	Note	%±
2010	240		—
2020	235		−2.1%
U.S. Decennial Census

Yeehaw Junction first appeared as a census designated place in the 2010 U.S. census. A CDP under the same name appeared in the 2000 U.S. census but was incorrectly identified in 2000 and should have appeared as Buena Ventura Lakes; no part of it is included in the current CDP.

=== Racial and ethnic composition ===
Yeehaw Junction CDP, Florida – Racial and ethnic composition Note: the US Census treats Hispanic/Latino as an ethnic category. This table excludes Latinos from the racial categories and assigns them to a separate category. Hispanics/Latinos may be of any race.
Race / Ethnicity (NH = Non-Hispanic)	Pop 2010	Pop 2020	% 2010	% 2020
White alone (NH)	214	198	89.17%	84.26%
Black or African American alone (NH)	0	6	0.00%	2.55%
Native American or Alaska Native alone (NH)	3	0	1.25%	0.00%
Asian alone (NH)	1	5	0.42%	2.13%
Native Hawaiian or Pacific Islander alone (NH)	0	1	0.00%	0.43%
Other race alone (NH)	0	0	0.00%	0.00%
Mixed race or Multiracial (NH)	7	13	2.92%	5.53%
Hispanic or Latino (any race)	15	12	6.25%	5.11%
Total	240	235	100.00%	100.00%

=== 2010 census ===
In 2010, Yeehaw Junction had a population of 240. The racial and ethnic composition of the population was 89.2% non-Hispanic white, 1.3% Native American, 0.4% Asian (one person), 2.9% reporting two or more races and 6.3% Hispanic or Latino.

== Present day ==
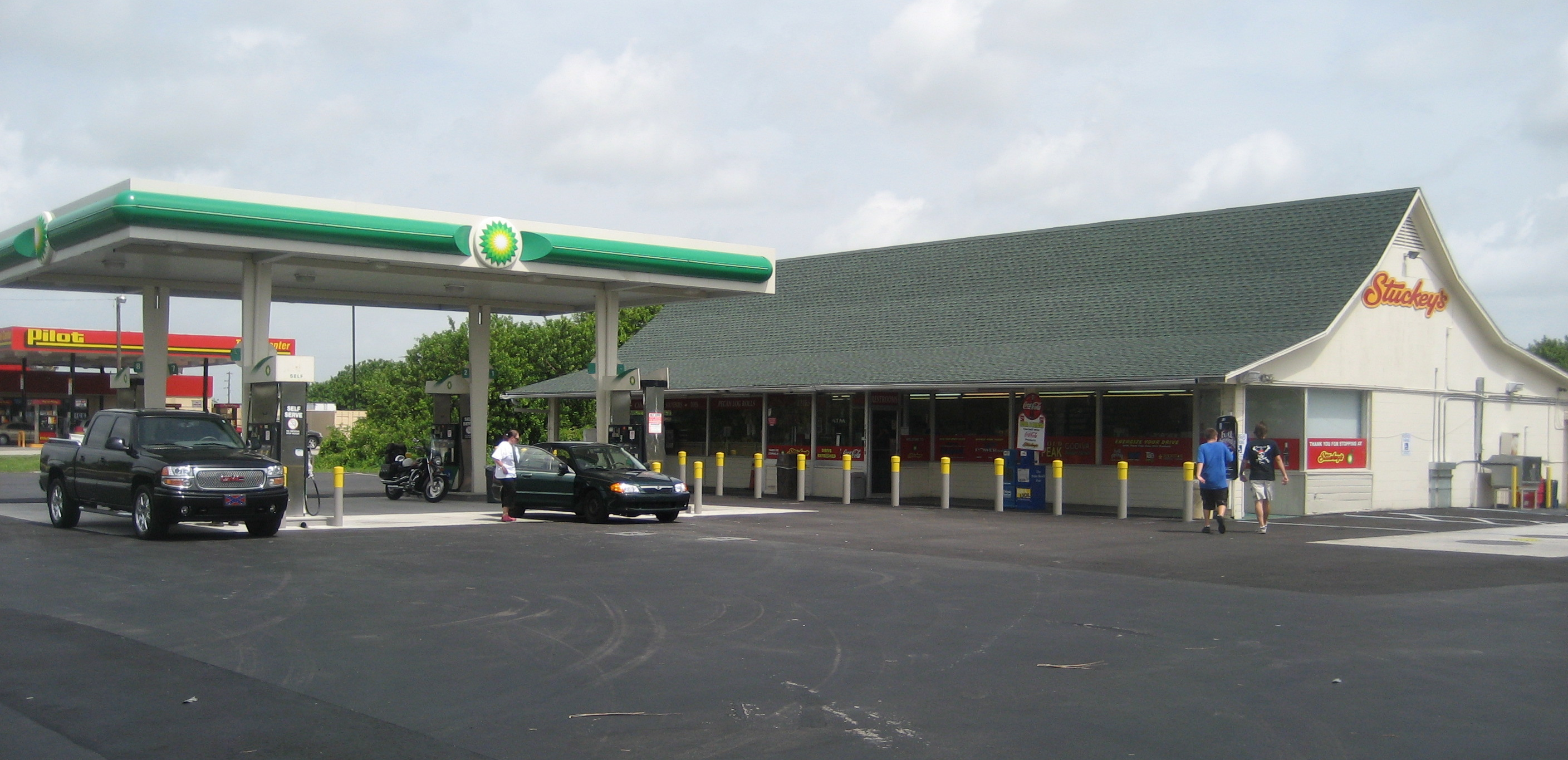
Stuckey's/BP in Yeehaw Junction, Florida

The Yeehaw Junction exit on Florida's Turnpike is still active. It was once known as a major stopping point for tourists to purchase conditional discount tickets for various tourist attractions in the Orlando area, but Yeehaw Junction's ticket booth has since closed down. The Turnpike exit links with State Road 60, an important traffic route going from Vero Beach on the Atlantic to Tampa and Clearwater Beach on the Gulf Coast. The Turnpike exit at Yeehaw Junction is notable for being the only exit on a nearly 90-mile stretch of the Turnpike. It is located at the southern end of the longest stretch of limited-access highway without an exit in the United States (the next interchange to the north being 48.9 miles away at Kissimmee/St. Cloud) and the northern end of the second-longest such stretch (the next exit to the south being 40.5 miles away at Fort Pierce).

Since the population is not large enough to support its own schools, children in the community can choose to attend Osceola County School District, which may be over an hour's bus ride for students (the nearest public school is located in St. Cloud), or be bused to closer schools in Indian River County or Okeechobee County.

The Desert Inn closed temporarily in June 2018. There were plans to reopen it as a museum, restaurant and motel after restorations. The Desert Inn was largely destroyed on December 22, 2019, when the driver of an 18-wheeler lost control on a nearby road and crashed it into the building at highway speed. The Osceola County Historical Society was court-ordered to sell the property on April 19, 2024 to V6 Holdings LLC, who demolished the structure on September 5, 2024.
