= Campbell, Florida =

- CDP
- Location in Osceola County and the state of Florida
- Coordinates: 28°15′37″N 81°27′09″W
- Country: United States
- State: Florida
- County: Osceola

Area
  - Total: 1.90 sq mi (4.92 km^{2})
  - Land: 1.88 sq mi (4.87 km^{2})
  - Water: 0.019 sq mi (0.05 km^{2})
- Elevation: 66 ft (20 m)

Population (2020)
  - Total: 2,610
  - Density: 1,386.7/sq mi (535.41/km^{2})
- Time zone: UTC-5 (Eastern (EST))
  - Summer (DST): UTC-4 (EDT)
- FIPS code: 12-09875
- GNIS feature ID: 2402744

Campbell (often referred to locally as Campbell City) is a census-designated place and an unincorporated community in Osceola County, Florida, United States. Campbell City was named after Alfred Sidney Campbell who opened and operated the general store in the settlement. As of the 2020 census, Campbell had a population of 2,610. It is part of the Orlando–Kissimmee Metropolitan Statistical Area.

Campbell is north of a predominantly Hispanic community known as Poinciana. Campbell has many cattle ranches and has a high school, a middle school and an elementary school.

== Demographics ==
Historical population
Census	Pop.	Note	%±
1980	2,941		—
1990	3,884		32.1%
2000	2,677		−31.1%
2010	2,479		−7.4%
2020	2,610		5.3%

=== 2020 census ===
As of the 2020 census, Campbell had a population of 2,610. The median age was 66.2 years. 11.7% of residents were under the age of 18 and 52.6% of residents were 65 years of age or older. For every 100 females there were 80.1 males, and for every 100 females age 18 and over there were 75.8 males age 18 and over.

100.0% of residents lived in urban areas, while 0.0% lived in rural areas.

There were 1,305 households in Campbell, of which 14.3% had children under the age of 18 living in them. Of all households, 33.8% were married-couple households, 19.5% were households with a male householder and no spouse or partner present, and 42.4% were households with a female householder and no spouse or partner present. About 45.4% of all households were made up of individuals and 35.4% had someone living alone who was 65 years of age or older.

There were 1,651 housing units, of which 21.0% were vacant. The homeowner vacancy rate was 4.0% and the rental vacancy rate was 23.5%.

Racial composition as of the 2020 census
Race	Number	Percent
White	1,637	62.7%
Black or African American	177	6.8%
American Indian and Alaska Native	11	0.4%
Asian	39	1.5%
Native Hawaiian and Other Pacific Islander	2	0.1%
Some other race	352	13.5%
Two or more races	392	15.0%
Hispanic or Latino (of any race)	941	36.1%

=== 2010 census ===
In 2010 Campbell had a population of 2,479. There were 1,189 households with 93.7% of the population living in households. The population's ethnic and racial composition was 79.4% non-Hispanic white, 2.3% black alone with another 0.6% of the population reporting being black as well as other races, 0.2% Native American, 1.4% Asian, 0.2% of Pacific Islander descent, 0.2% non-Hispanic reporting some other race and 2.3% reporting two or more races. 15.5% of the population was Hispanic or Latino with 9.4% of the total population being Puerto Rican.

=== 2000 census ===
As of the census of 2000, there were 2,677 people, 1,352 households, and 686 families residing in the CDP. The population density was 1,429.0 inhabitants per square mile (551.7/km^{2}). There were 1,853 housing units at an average density of 989.1 per square mile (381.9/km^{2}). The racial makeup of the CDP was 94.55% White, 0.93% African American, 0.26% Native American, 0.86% Asian, 0.07% Pacific Islander, 1.72% from other races, and 1.61% from two or more races. Hispanic or Latino of any race were 4.45% of the population.

The ancestors of the population were German (18.2%), Irish (12.3%), English (10.9%), United States (5.4%), Swedish (3.2%), Italian (3.2%).

There were 1,352 households, out of which 11.9% had children under the age of 18 living with them, 41.6% were married couples living together, 7.0% had a female householder with no husband present, and 49.2% were non-families. 46.4% of all households were made up of individuals, and 39.7% had someone living alone who was 65 years of age or older. The average household size was 1.87 and the average family size was 2.58.

In the CDP, the population was spread out, with 13.3% under the age of 18, 3.5% from 18 to 24, 14.5% from 25 to 44, 16.0% from 45 to 64, and 52.7% who were 65 years of age or older. The median age was 67 years. For every 100 females, there were 71.1 males. For every 100 females age 18 and over, there were 65.5 males.

The median income for a household in the CDP was $26,373, and the median income for a family was $34,063. Males had a median income of $26,250 versus $24,609 for females. The per capita income for the CDP was $18,721. About 12.9% of families and 13.5% of the population were below the poverty line, including 34.2% of those under age 18 and 8.0% of those age 65 or over.
