= Poinciana, Florida =

- Census-designated place
- Location within Florida Location within the United States
- Coordinates: 28°09′24″N 81°28′23″W
- Country: United States
- State: Florida
- County: Osceola, Polk

Area
  - Total: 72.94 sq mi (188.91 km^{2})
  - Land: 71.87 sq mi (186.14 km^{2})
  - Water: 1.07 sq mi (2.77 km^{2})
- Elevation: 62 ft (19 m)

Population (2020)
  - Total: 69,309
  - Density: 964.4/sq mi (372.36/km^{2})
- Time zone: UTC-5 (Eastern (EST))
  - Summer (DST): UTC-4 (EDT)
- ZIP codes: 34758, 34759
- Area codes: 407, 689, 321, 863
- FIPS code: 12-57900
- GNIS feature ID: 2403432

Poinciana (English: /pɔɪnsiˈænə/) is a settlement and census-designated place (CDP) in Osceola and Polk counties in the U.S. state of Florida. It is part of the Greater Orlando area. As of the 2020 census, the CDP had a population of 69,309.

== Transportation ==
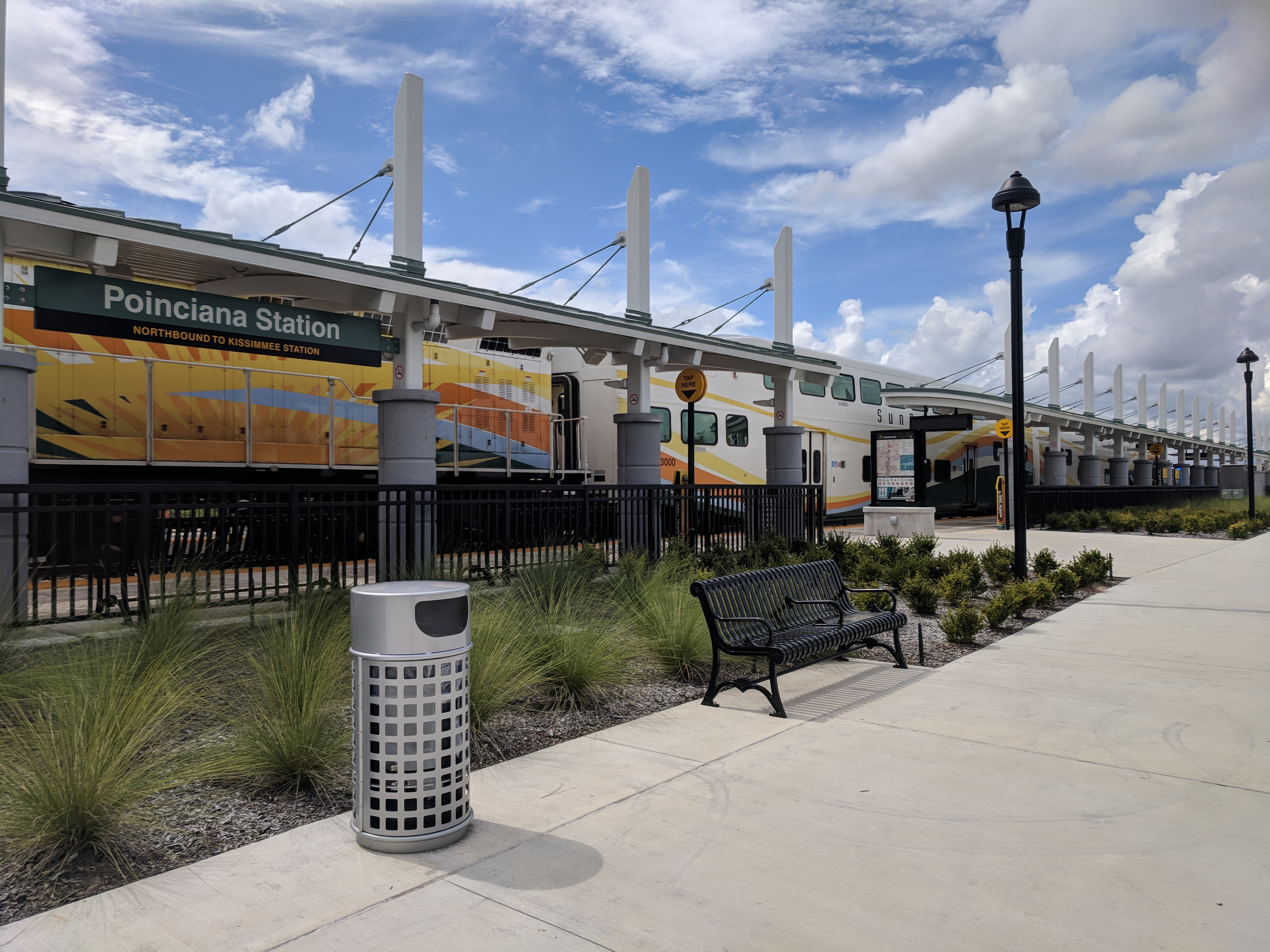
A SunRail Commuter Train at Poinciana Station

U.S. Highway 17/92 (here part of the Orange Blossom Trail) runs through the north of Poinciana. The Poinciana Parkway (State Road 538), a toll road to connect Poinciana more directly to Interstate 4, was opened on April 30, 2016.

Poinciana is the southern terminus of the SunRail system. SunRail's Poinciana station is located in the north of Poinciana near the intersection of Orange Blossom Trail (aka U.S. Highway 17/92) and Poinciana Boulevard, and opened on July 30, 2018. Local bus service is provided from central areas of Poinciana to Kissimmee and Haines City by the Lynx network.

== Geography ==
It lies southwest of Kissimmee and approximately 14 miles (23 km) east of Haines City.

According to the United States Census Bureau, the CDP has a total area of 35.3 square miles (91 km^{2}), of which 35.1 square miles (91 km^{2}) is land and 0.2 square miles (0.52 km^{2}), or 0.68%, is water.

=== Subdivisions ===
Poinciana was planned as a Planned Unit Development (PUD). Most of the PUD was developed in 10 Villages with each being their own sub association and corporation duly recorded with the State of Florida Corporation, which form the Association of Poinciana Villages (APV) Master Association. Four of the villages are in Osceola County (Village 1 with Cypress Woods and Stepping Stone, Villages 2, 5 and Village 9 (Broadmoor - mobile home park) and six Villages 3, 4, 6, 7 and 8) are in Polk County. Located on approximately 47,000 acres (190 km^{2}), the sub-villages are their own association under a deed-restricted community, governed by a Master homeowner association, the APV. Solivita is no longer under the APV Master Association (Village 10), it was removed by the APV Executive Committee on November 2, 2011, one of the Villages within Polk County, it is a 55+ gated community. and comprises two Community Development Districts, Poinciana CDD and Poinciana West CDD.

Neighbor subdivisions such as Waterford, Little Creek, Brighton Lakes, Oak Hammock Preserve, Crescent Lakes, Trafalgar, Doral, Isles of Bellalago, Cypress Cove, Deerwood, Wilderness, Bellalago, etc. are outside the CDP. Many of these subdivisions were defined in the original Poinciana boundary PUD but some were later developed as separate communities outside the APV.

== History ==
Poinciana was planned in the 1960s. The original developer was Gulf American Corporation. Poinciana was conceived as a retirement destination, and the first homes were built in 1973 around the Poinciana Golf and Racquet Club. Since the mid-1980s the developer has been AV Homes (formerly Avatar Holdings). By 1994 the population had only risen to about 8,000, but since then growth has been rapid. On June 7, 2018, Taylor Morrison Homes announced its agreement to Acquire AV Homes, Inc at $21.90 per share.

On February 11, 1993, a Winn-Dixie store opened at 900 Cypress Parkway, making it the first supermarket in Poinciana. This location is notable for being a prototype of the Food Pavilion store format, which would launch in the 1990s. It would later close in 2010 due to competition from the nearby Walmart and Publix locations.

Developments in the area have been made to meet the rapidly growing population. Phase 1 of Poinciana Lakes Plaza, a shopping center located at the northwest corner of Cypress Parkway and Marigold Ave, was completed in April 2024, with Phase 2 opening in stages. It was built by commercial development company TCII Capital.

== Demographics ==
Historical population
Census	Pop.	Note	%±
2000	13,647		—
2010	53,193		289.8%
2020	69,309		30.3%

=== Racial and ethnic composition ===
Poinciana racial composition (Hispanics excluded from racial categories) (NH = Non-Hispanic)
Race	Pop 2010	Pop 2020	% 2010	% 2020
White (NH)	12,015	12,509	22.59%	18.05%
Black or African American (NH)	11,321	14,742	21.28%	21.27%
Native American or Alaska Native (NH)	102	102	0.23%	0.15%
Asian (NH)	910	1,217	1.71%	1.76%
Pacific Islander or Native Hawaiian (NH)	82	34	0.15%	0.05%
Some other race (NH)	360	830	0.68%	1.20%
Two or more races/Multiracial (NH)	1,147	1,914	2.16%	2.76%
Hispanic or Latino (any race)	27,234	37,961	51.20%	54.77%
Total	53,193	69,309		

=== 2020 census ===
As of the 2020 census, Poinciana had a population of 69,309. The median age was 39.6 years. 24.1% of residents were under the age of 18 and 20.6% of residents were 65 years of age or older. For every 100 females there were 91.0 males, and for every 100 females age 18 and over there were 87.1 males age 18 and over.

97.1% of residents lived in urban areas, while 2.9% lived in rural areas.

There were 22,546 households in Poinciana, of which 36.8% had children under the age of 18 living in them. Of all households, 53.3% were married-couple households, 12.1% were households with a male householder and no spouse or partner present, and 26.6% were households with a female householder and no spouse or partner present. About 15.6% of all households were made up of individuals and 8.7% had someone living alone who was 65 years of age or older.

There were 25,014 housing units, of which 9.9% were vacant. The homeowner vacancy rate was 2.4% and the rental vacancy rate was 8.4%.

=== 2010 census ===
As of the 2010 United States census, there were 53,193 people, 16,375 households, and 13,517 families residing in the CDP.

In the 2010 Census CDP the population was spread out, with 29.27% under the age of 18, and 70.73% age 18 and over.

=== 2000 census ===
For census 2000 there were 4,153 households, out of which 50.3% had children under the age of 18 living with them, 65.5% were married couples living together, 15.4% had a female householder with no husband present, and 14.2% were non-families. 10.5% of all households were made up of individuals, and 3.7% had someone living alone who was 65 years of age or older. The average household size was 3.29 and the average family size was 3.49.

In 2000 the median income for a household in the CDP was $37,172, and the median income for a family was $37,688. Males had a median income of $26,860 versus $20,934 for females. The per capita income for the CDP was $12,590. About 12.0% of families and 12.8% of the population were below the poverty line, including 17.9% of those under age 18 and 12.3% of those age 65 or over.

== Education ==
- Osceola County
  - Pre-Kindergarten Schools
    - Liberty High School (Pre-K)
    - Poinciana 247 Pre-K & V.P.K. (Private School)
    - Poinciana Christian Preparatory School (K-12) (Private School)
    - Reedy Creek Elementary (Pre-K)
  - Elementary Schools
    - Bellalago Academy (K-8) (District managed charter school)
    - Renaissance Charter School at Poinciana (K-8)
    - Chestnut Elementary (CES)
    - Deerwood Elementary (DWE)
    - Koa Elementary
    - Poinciana Academy Of Fine Arts (PAFA)
    - Reedy Creek Elementary (RCES)
    - Mater Brighton Lakes Academy
  - Middle Schools
    - Bellalago Academy
    - Discovery Intermediate (DIS)
    - Horizon Middle (HMS)
    - Mater Brighton Lakes Academy (MBLA)
  - High Schools
    - Poinciana High School (PHS)
    - New Dimensions (NDHS) (public charter high school)
    - Liberty High School (LHS):
  - Post-secondary Schools
    - Valencia College Poinciana Campus (opened Fall 2017)
- Polk County
  - Elementary Schools
    - Palmetto Elementary (pre Kindergarten-5th grade)
    - Laurel Elementary (Up to 4th grade)
  - Middle Schools
    - Lake Marion Creek Middle School (6–8) (LMC)

== Notable person ==
Pro wrestler Rikishi resides in Poinciana.

== Libraries ==
- Poinciana Branch Library - Osceola library system

== See also ==
- Greater Orlando
