= Buenaventura Lakes, Florida =

- CDP
- Location in Florida Buenaventura Lakes (the United States)
- Coordinates: 28°20′06″N 81°21′14″W
- Country: United States
- State: Florida
- County: Osceola

Area
  - Total: 5.65 sq mi (14.64 km^{2})
  - Land: 5.58 sq mi (14.44 km^{2})
  - Water: 0.077 sq mi (0.20 km^{2})
- Elevation: 79 ft (24 m)

Population (2020)
  - Total: 30,251
  - Density: 5,424.4/sq mi (2,094.36/km^{2})
- Time zone: UTC-5 (Eastern (EST))
  - Summer (DST): UTC-4 (EDT)
- ZIP code: 34743
- FIPS code: 12-09415
- GNIS feature ID: 2546911

Buenaventura Lakes, more commonly known as BVL, is a census-designated place (CDP) in northern Osceola County, Florida, United States, near Kissimmee. As of the 2020 census, Buenaventura Lakes had a population of 30,251. It is part of the Orlando–Kissimmee–Sanford, Florida Metropolitan Statistical Area.

The community is served by the Osceola Library System.

Buenaventura Lakes is well known as a Puerto Rican and New Yorican neighborhood (Little Puerto Rico or Little New York).

== Geography ==
Buenaventura Lakes is located northeast of Kissimmee, near the interchange of the Osceola Parkway and Florida's Turnpike. Its northern side is adjacent to Meadow Woods in Orange County.

== Demographics ==
Historical population
Census	Pop.	Note	%±
1990	14,148		—
2000	21,778		53.9%
2010	26,079		19.7%
2020	30,251		16.0%

The community first appeared as a census designated place in the 1990 U.S. census under the name Buena Ventura Lakes; and then was incorrectly lised as Yeehaw Junction in the 2000 U.S. Census. The community name was restored as Buenaventura Lakes in the 2010 U.S. census. A CDP named Yeehaw Junction was created in the 2010 U.S. census.

=== Racial and ethnic composition ===
Buenaventura Lakes CDP, Florida – Racial and ethnic composition Note: the US Census treats Hispanic/Latino as an ethnic category. This table excludes Latinos from the racial categories and assigns them to a separate category. Hispanics/Latinos may be of any race.
Race / Ethnicity (NH = Non-Hispanic)	Pop 2000	Pop 2010	Pop 2020	% 2000	% 2010	% 2020
White alone (NH)	6,530	3,947	3,152	29.98%	15.13%	10.42%
Black or African American alone (NH)	2,203	2,750	2,863	10.12%	10.54%	9.46%
Native American or Alaska Native alone (NH)	43	27	43	0.20%	0.10%	0.14%
Asian alone (NH)	574	632	557	2.64%	2.42%	1.84%
Native Hawaiian or Pacific Islander alone (NH)	18	25	22	0.08%	0.10%	0.07%
Other race alone (NH)	92	162	331	0.42%	0.62%	1.09%
Mixed race or Multiracial (NH)	420	376	553	1.93%	1.44%	1.83%
Hispanic or Latino (any race)	11,898	18,160	22,730	54.63%	69.63%	75.14%
Total	21,778	26,079	30,251	100.00%	100.00%	100.00%

=== 2020 census ===
As of the 2020 census, Buenaventura Lakes had a population of 30,251. The median age was 38.8 years. 22.0% of residents were under the age of 18 and 15.4% of residents were 65 years of age or older. For every 100 females there were 92.7 males, and for every 100 females age 18 and over there were 89.4 males age 18 and over.

100.0% of residents lived in urban areas, while 0.0% lived in rural areas.

There were 9,619 households in Buenaventura Lakes, of which 38.9% had children under the age of 18 living in them. Of all households, 49.2% were married-couple households, 13.7% were households with a male householder and no spouse or partner present, and 28.7% were households with a female householder and no spouse or partner present. About 13.9% of all households were made up of individuals and 5.9% had someone living alone who was 65 years of age or older.

There were 10,103 housing units, of which 4.8% were vacant. The homeowner vacancy rate was 1.2% and the rental vacancy rate was 6.1%.

=== 2010 census ===
As of the 2010 Census, there were 26,079 people, and 8,415 households in the CDP. The population density was 4,675.3 people per square mile. There were 9,340 housing units in the CDP.

The racial makeup of the CDP was 61.2% white (15.1% non-Hispanic white), 14.2% black or African American, 0.6% American Indian or Alaska Native, 2.6% Asian, 0.1% Pacific Islander, and 4.9% were from two or more races. Hispanic or Latinos of any race made up 69.6% of the population, Puerto Ricans alone made up 44.5 percent (11,618) of the area's population.

6.5% of the population was under 5 years old, 26.4% was under 18 years old, and 11.5% was 65 years or older.

The median household income was $41,155, and the per capita income was $15,950. 16.7% of the population lived below the poverty line.

68.9% of the population 5 years or older spoke a language other than English at home.

78.9% of the population aged 25 or older were a high school graduate or higher, and 11.2% of the population aged 25 or older had a bachelor's degree or higher.

=== 2000 census ===
As of the census of 2000, there were 21,778 people, 6,901 households, and 5,645 families residing in the CDP. The population density was 3,892.0 inhabitants per square mile (1,502.7/km^{2}). There were 7,931 housing units at an average density of 1,417.4 per square mile (547.3/km^{2}). The racial makeup of the CDP was 62.66% White, 11.78% African American, 0.38% Native American, 2.68% Asian, 0.09% Pacific Islander, 17.48% from other races, and 4.93% from two or more races. Hispanic or Latino people of any race were 54.63% of the population.

There were 6,901 households, out of which 41.4% had children under the age of 18 living with them, 60.1% were married couples living together, 16.4% had a female householder with no husband present, and 18.2% were non-families. 13.2% of all households were made up of individuals, and 5.6% had someone living alone who is 65 years of age or older. The average household size was 3.15 and the average family size was 3.42.

In the CDP, the population was spread out, with 29.1% under the age of 18, 9.6% from 18 to 24, 28.6% from 25 to 44, 21.7% from 45 to 64, and 11.0% who were 65 years of age or older. The median age was 34 years. For every 100 females, there were 93.4 males. For every 100 females age 18 and over, there were 89.7 males.

The median income for a household in the CDP was $39,023, and the median income for a family was $40,764. Males had a median income of $26,768 versus $21,314 for females. The per capita income for the CDP was $14,742. About 7.9% of families and 10.2% of the population were below the poverty line, including 11.6% under the age of 18 and 11.5% ages 65 or older.
